= Goliad Campaign =

1836 campaign of the Texas Revolution

- Part of the Texas Revolution
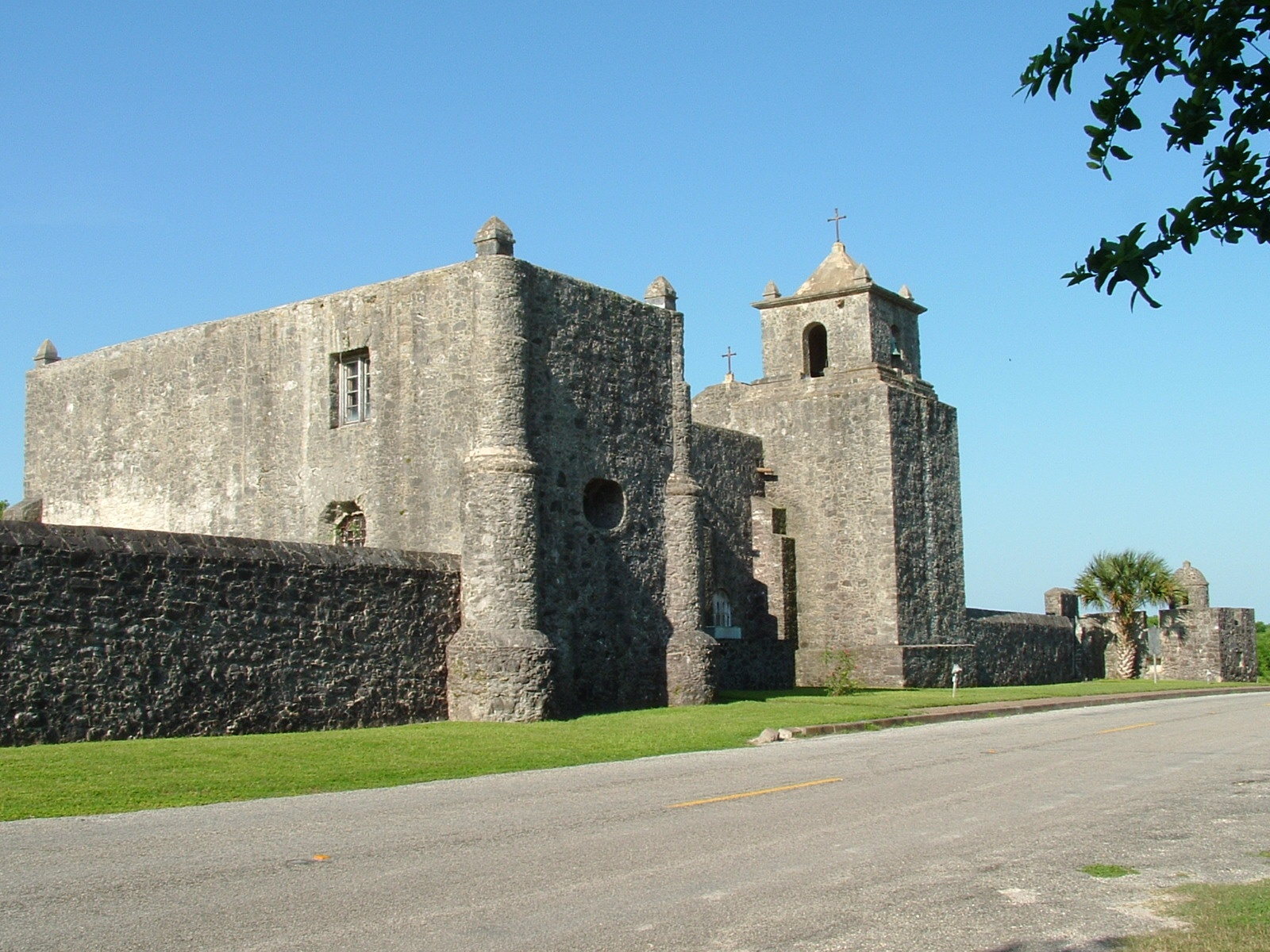
- Fort Defiance in Goliad, Texas
Date	February 18 – March 27, 1836
Location	Texas Gulf Coast
Result	Mexican victory; Goliad Massacre

Belligerents
Mexican Republic	Texian Rebels; later the Republic of Texas

Commanders and leaders
José de Urrea	Frank W. Johnson (surrendered); James Grant †; James Fannin (executed); Amon B. King (executed); William Ward (executed)

Strength
1,500 regulars, militia, and cavalry	500; 9 cannons

Casualties and losses
est. 350 killed, injured, or missing	472 KIA, executed, or imprisoned 9 cannons captured 28 captured but escaped

The Goliad Campaign was the failed 1836 Mexican offensive to retake the Texas Gulf Coast during the Texas Revolution. Mexican troops under the command of General José de Urrea ambushed Groups of Texians in the Mexican province of Texas, known as Mexican Texas, in a series of clashes in February and March.

When Mexico transitioned to a centralized government in 1835, supporters of federalism took up arms. Texians in Texas, primarily from the towns of Gonzales and Columbia, revolted in October 1835 and by the end of the year had expelled all Mexican troops from their province. With hostilities temporarily suspended, Frank W. Johnson and James Grant gathered volunteers for a planned invasion of the Mexican port town of Matamoros. James Fannin commanded troops stationed at Fort Defiance in Goliad.

Unbeknownst to the Texians, on February 18 Urrea led a large contingent of troops from Matamoros into Texas to neutralize the rebels gathered along the coast. His troops easily defeated Johnson's small force at the Battle of San Patricio on February 26. Several days later, informants revealed Grant's location, and on the morning of March 2, 150 Mexican troops ambushed Grant's men at the Battle of Agua Dulce. The Mexican army then turned northward, headed towards Goliad. On March 12, they encountered a group of Texian soldiers, under the command of William Ward at Refugio. The Texians repulsed Mexican attacks for several days. On March 15, as their ammunition ran short, Texians retreated from Refugio. Many were killed or captured.

Fannin ordered the bulk of his army to retreat from Goliad on March 19, in the hopes of joining the forces of General Sam Houston. That afternoon, Urrea's troops surrounded the Texians on an open prairie. The Battle of Coleto ended with a Texian surrender on March 20. Urrea marched the Texians back to Fort Defiance, where they were held under guard. One week later, under the orders of Mexican General Antonio López de Santa Anna, the Texians were marched outside the fort and shot.

News of the Goliad Massacre spread outrage, resentment, and fear among the population of the fledgling Republic of Texas and abroad.

== Background ==
Under President Antonio López de Santa Anna, the Mexican government began to shift away from a federalist model to a more centralized government. His increasingly dictatorial policies, including the revocation of the Constitution of 1824 in early 1835, incited federalists throughout the nation to revolt. The Mexican army quickly put down revolts in the Mexican interior, including a brutal suppression of militias in Oaxaca and Zacatecas. Unrest continued in the Mexican state Coahuila y Tejas. The area that bordered the United States, known as Texas, was populated primarily by English-speaking settlers, known as Texians. In October, the Texians took up arms in what became known as the Texas Revolution. The following month, Texians declared themselves part of a state independent from Coahuila and created a provisional state government based on the principles of the Constitution of 1824. By the end of the year, all Mexican troops had been expelled from Texas.

Determined to quash the rebellion, Santa Anna began assembling a large force to restore order; by the end of 1835 his army numbered 6,019 soldiers. In late December, at his behest, the Mexican Congress passed the Tornel Decree, declaring that any foreigners fighting against Mexican troops "will be deemed pirates and dealt with as such, being citizens of no nation presently at war with the Republic and fighting under no recognized flag". In the early nineteenth century, captured pirates were executed immediately. The resolution thus gave the Mexican Army permission to take no prisoners in the war against the Texians. Santa Anna personally led the bulk of his troops inland to San Antonio de Béxar and ordered General José de Urrea to lead 550 troops along the Atascocita Road toward Goliad.

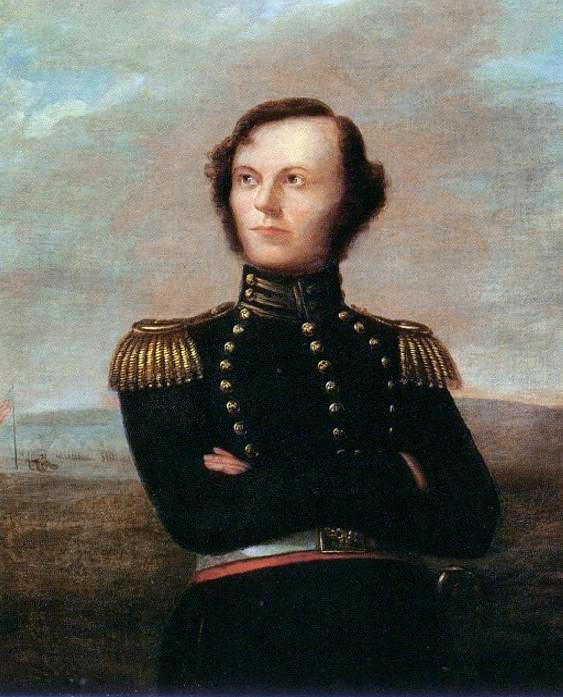
A portrait of James W. Fannin

In Goliad, Colonel James Fannin commanded the Texan force of nearly 500 trained soldiers and militia. Fannin had chosen to keep his troops at Goliad mainly because it had a fort, from which he believed it would be easier to fight than out in the open. Fannin also believed that by occupying Goliad, he could prevent Mexican commander Antonio López de Santa Anna from drawing supplies from the Gulf of Mexico, but Fannin was called to assist Colonel William Travis at the Alamo. On February 26, 1836, he attempted to march to San Antonio but turned back at the San Antonio River because of the inability to travel with the artillery and arms. Meanwhile, Mexican forces under General José de Urrea were quickly reaching Goliad, and they defeated three Texan forces at the Battle of San Patricio on February 27, the Battle of Agua Dulce on March 2, and the Battle of Refugio on March 12.

== Battle of Refugio ==
Fannin sent Captain Amon B. King on a mission to Refugio on March 11, to remove several noncombatant families out of the path of Urrea's army. On March 13, King was surrounded by elements of the Mexican army and sent out a plea for help to Fannin, who sent Lieutenant-Colonel William Ward and the Georgia Battalion to reinforce him. Urrea, meanwhile, heard of their presence and marched a flying column of 300 Mexican troops to Refugio, hoping to overtake the Texians. On March 14, Ward defended his position at the Refugio Mission, while King's men fought from a stand of trees. The two sides clashed and fought until dark with Urrea's soldiers suffering heavy casualties, when Colonel Ward received word from Fannin to rendezvous at Victoria. That night, King led his men in an independent escape attempt. They were overtaken shortly and surrendered for lack of munitions. Captain King and all but one man were executed in short order.

Ward and the Georgia Battalion attempted to escape to Victoria, where they expected to link up with the balance of Fannin's command. After wandering on the coastal prairie for several days, the Georgia Battalion reached Victoria, only to find it in the possession of the Mexican army. They then headed for Lavaca Bay, where they would end up surrounded. Short on munitions and supplies, with no hope of rescue, the majority of Ward's men voted to surrender under good terms. Only then were they made aware that Colonel Fannin and his men had already surrendered following the Battle of Coleto. They were marched back to Goliad to face the same fate as the rest of Fannin's command.

== Fannin's retreat and the Battle of Coleto ==
Fannin was ordered by General Sam Houston on March 11, 1836, to abandon Goliad and retreat to the Guadalupe River near Victoria. However, he had sent most of his carts and horses with Ward to Refugio and had no cavalry. He sent couriers to Ward, but most of them were intercepted by Urrea's cavalry. Fannin hoped to retreat to Victoria, but he hesitated for several days. Urrea, meanwhile, sent cavalry to surround and isolate Goliad. He linked up with several more units of Mexican infantry, bringing the total number of Mexican troops in the area to 1,500.

=== Coleto Creek ===
On March 18, Urrea's advance scouts were viewing Goliad. Not until the morning of March 19 did Fannin finally begin his retreat from Goliad. Weighted down with cannon and 500 extra guns, Fannin burned his extra supplies in an attempt to lighten the load. The Texians had traveled only six miles (10 km) from their fort when, on March 19, the Mexican army engaged the Texians on an open prairie. The Texians were less than one mile (1.6 km) from the safety of the tree line of Coleto Creek. That afternoon, Urrea's cavalry encircled the Texians. After several hours of fighting, the Mexicans had suffered an estimated 200 casualties and the Texians nine killed and about sixty wounded. Fighting was halted that day at dark. Fannin could have probably cut his way to safety, but he refused to abandon the wounded. The next morning, seeing Urrea receive one hundred more men and three more artillery pieces, Fannin agreed to surrender. Fannin met to discuss terms with Colonel Juan José Holzinger ("Holsinger"). Fannin was unaware General Santa Anna had decreed execution for all rebels. General Urrea negotiated surrender "at the disposal of the Supreme Mexican Government", falsely stating that no prisoner taken on those terms had lost his life.

== The Massacre ==
The Texians were marched back to Goliad and held as prisoners at Fort Defiance, each believing that they were going to be set free in a matter of weeks. Knowing the prisoners' probable fate, General Urrea departed Goliad, leaving command to Colonel Jose Nicolas de la Portilla, and later writing to Santa Anna to ask for clemency for the Texians. Urrea wrote in his diary that he "...wished to elude these orders as far as possible without compromising my personal responsibility." On March 26, 1836, 19:00, Portilla received orders from Santa Anna in triplicate to execute the prisoners. At around 8 a.m. on Palm Sunday, March 27, 1836, Colonel Portilla had the able bodied of 342 Texians marched out of Fort Defiance into three columns on the Bexar Road, San Patricio Road, and the Victoria Road.

Once the columns reached their selected location, the Mexican soldados formed into two ranks on one side of the captives. The Texians were then fired on at point-blank range only a few hundred yards from the fort. The wounded and dying were then clubbed and stabbed. Those who survived the initial volley were run down by the Mexican cavalry. Fannin's men wounded in the Battle of Coleto were shot or bayoneted where they lay, inside the presidio.

Colonel Fannin was the last to be executed, after seeing his men butchered. He was taken by Mexican soldiers to the courtyard located in front of the chapel along the north wall, blindfolded, and seated in a chair due to his leg wound received in battle. Before his execution he made three requests. He asked for his personal possessions to be sent to his family, to be shot in his heart and not his face, and that he be given a Christian burial. His personal possessions were taken by Mexican soldiers, he was shot in the face, and Fannin's body was burned along with the many other Texians who died that day.

Twenty-eight Texians managed to escape by feigning death and other means. Three known survivors escaped to Houston's army and participated in the Battle of San Jacinto. In some accounts of the Goliad Massacre, a Mexican woman, Francisca (Francita, Panchita or Pancheta) Alavez, sometimes referred to by other names (Alvarez or Alavesco), rescued about 20 Texian soldiers and became known as "The Angel of Goliad." Other people known to have rescued some prisoners were: Juan Holzinger (saved two German Texians captured among Capt. Amon B. King's men and at Victoria he saved twenty-six of Lt. Col. William Ward's troops by claiming to need them to transport cannons across the San Antonio River), Colonel Garay, Father Maloney (also referred as Molloy), Urrea's wife and an unnamed girl.

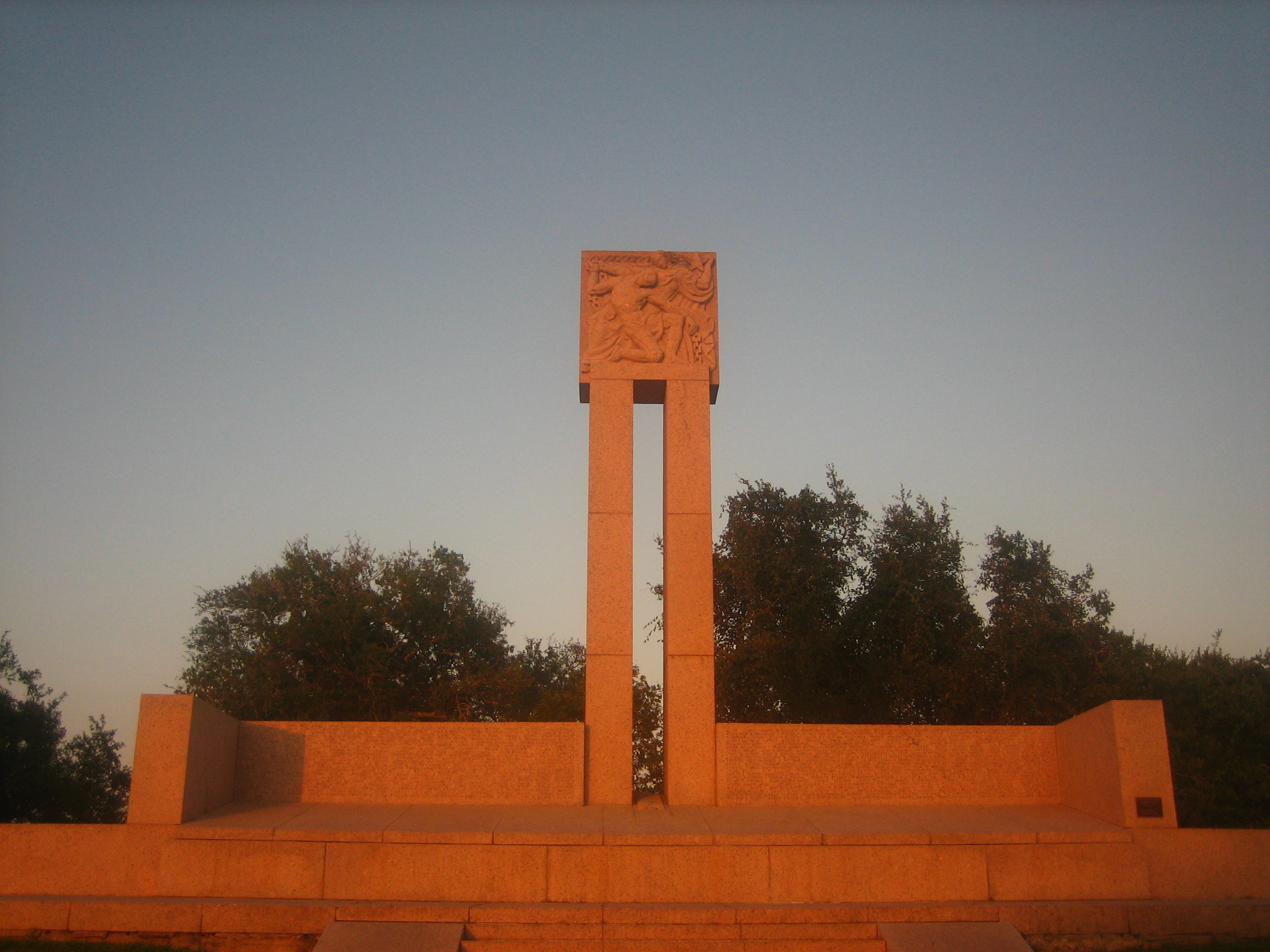
The Fannin Monument commemorates the massacre by Mexico of 342 Texians promised safe passage upon surrendering.

== Written account ==
One survivor of the massacre, a young German named H. Von Ehrenberg, wrote an account of the murders on December 3, 1853. He said the Texan prisoners and American volunteers numbered about 400, while the Mexican captors totaled 700, in addition to cavalry and smaller groups of Mexican soldiers he saw gathered on the prairie. He described the slaughter:

"Kneel down!" Now burst in harsh accents from the lips of the Mexican commander. No one stirred. Few of us understood the order, and those who did would not obey. The Mexican soldiers who stood at about three paces from us, leveled their muskets at our breasts. Even then we could hardly believe that they meant to shoot us, for if we had we should assuredly have rushed forward in our desperation, and weaponless though we were, some of our murderers would have met their death at our hands.

The sound of a second volley, from a different direction than the first just then reached our ears, and was followed by a confused cry, as if those at whom it had been aimed, had not all immediately been killed. A thick cloud of smoke was wreathing toward the San Antonio River. The blood of my lieutenant was on my clothes, and around me lay my friends convulsed in their last agony. I saw nothing more. Unhurt myself, I sprang up and, concealed by the thick smoke, fled along the hedge in the direction of the river, the noise of the water for my guide.

On I went, the river rolled at my feet, the shouting and yelling behind. "Texas forever!" And without a moment's hesitation, I plunged into the water. The bullets whistled round me as I swam slowly and wearily to the other side, but none wounded me. Whilst these horrible scenes were occurring on the prairies, Col. Fannin and his wounded companions were shot and bayoneted at Goliad, only Dr. Shackleford and a few hospital aids having their lives spared, in order that they might attend the wounded Mexicans.

Another written account can be found in Early Times in Texas (serial form, 1868–71; book, 1892) by John Crittenden Duval.

== See also ==
- List of Texas Revolution battles
- Timeline of the Texas Revolution
