= Matamoros Expedition =

1836 Texan invasion of Mexico

The Matamoros Expedition was a planned 1836 invasion of the Mexican port town of Matamoros by rebellious Texians. As the Mexican government transitioned from federalism to a centralized government in 1835, many federalists offered armed opposition. In Mexican Texas, settlers launched a full rebellion, known as the Texas Revolution, in October. By the end of the year, the Texians had expelled all Mexican soldiers from their territory. Confident that there would be no more fighting within their lands, Texans began looking for ways to extend the fight.

== Background ==
By the late 1820s, the third most important port in Mexico was Matamoros, in the state of Tamaulipas. Located on the Rio Grande, approximately 31 miles (50 km) from the Gulf of Mexico, the bustling port served much of northeastern Mexico and received a significant amount of international traffic from the United States and Europe.

== Dimmitt ==
The Matamoros Expedition traces its origins to an October 15, 1835 letter to Texian Army commander Stephen F. Austin from Philip Dimmitt, newly appointed commandant of the Texian garrison at Presidio La Bahia in Goliad. Dimmitt proposed that his forces be sent to capture Fort Lipantitlan, a small Mexican army base south of Goliad. Eliminating the Mexican forces at this coastal location would give the Texians a clear path to invade Matamoros, hopefully encouraging federalists in the Mexican interior to join the Texian revolt.

After his troops took Fort Lipantitlan in November, Dimmitt withdrew his support for an invasion of the Mexican interior. As his troops were returning to Goliad, they encountered Agustin Viesca, the former governor of Coahuila y Tejas who had escaped imprisonment. Viesca's commentary on events within Mexico convinced Dimmitt that taking Matamoros was no longer feasible. He wrote to Austin, "In a former communication, I hinted the policy of a dash at Matamoros, hoping from what I had then heard, that the movement would be approved and sustained by a majority of the people in that section of the country, but now, I fear it would not be. On the contrary, I am fully satisfied that such a movement on the part of Texas, would be as likely to be opposed as to be approved". Nevertheless, Dimmitt continued to prepare for a potential invasion, and as reports from inside Mexico reached him, his desire to invade fluctuated. On December 2, he wrote a letter, published in early January, that again advocated for an invasion of Matamoros. His letter explained that invading the interior would take the war out of Texas, and a successful attempt could give the Texians the estimated $100,000 per month in revenue that the Matamoros port accumulated. Dimmitt believed that any expedition into Mexico should be led by someone who had been born a Mexican citizen, and he proposed Lorenzo de Zavala as commander. De Zavala claimed ill health.

== Planning ==
In mid-March, the Consultation met and formed a provisional Texas government, headed by Henry Smith. The council promptly created a new regular army, to be headed by Sam Houston. Houston would be required to raise his army from scratch rather than take over the volunteer force already commanded by Austin.

The council was very interested in working with federalists within Mexico to strengthen the revolution. Smith, on the other hand, was wary of working with most Mexican citizens, saying "I consider it bad policy to fit out, or trust Mexicans in any manner connected with our government, as I am well satisfied that we will in the end find them inimical [e.g. hostile] and treacherous". Nevertheless, the council, hearing reports that other Mexican states were near revolt, on December 25 authorized an expedition into Matamoros. They listed several reasons for the attempt, including:

- The Texas government could confiscate all fees collected at the port
- Texas would have command of the Gulf of Mexico from Matamoros to New Orleans
- The Mexican centralists would not be able to use Matamoros as a staging ground to invade Texas
- The Texian troops were bored and would not cause trouble if they had a task to do.

Smith initially had supported the plan and on December 17, he instructed Houston to begin planning for such an expedition. Houston delegated the task to James Bowie but Bowie did not receive his orders for several weeks. Without consulting Smith, on December 15, the Council asked Edward Burleson to oversee an expedition to Matamoros. Burleson had replaced Austin as commander of the volunteer Texian Army. Days before, they had taken San Antonio de Bexar after a long siege. Their victory ensured that no Mexican troops remained within Texas. Unbeknownst to the council, after the victory Burleson had submitted his resignation to Smith. He left Frank W. Johnson in charge of the amassed troops. On January 3, Johnson wrote to the Council that he had received the note addressed to Burleson and had initiated the expedition.

On December 30, Johnson partnered with James Grant and ordered most of the volunteers to leave Bexar and gather at Goliad. Only 100 men were left to garrison in Bexar. They were placed under the command of Colonel James C. Neill and stationed in the Alamo Mission. The 200 men who accompanied Johnson had previously volunteered to garrison Bexar; their departure put them in violation of the terms of their enlistment.

The Council voted to make Johnson the official commander of the expedition. He initially refused, citing another dispute with the council, before changing his mind the following day. In the interim, the council appointed James W. Fannin to lead the expedition. They did not revoke Johnson's orders, leaving two men with authority to raise an army to go to Matamoros.

When Grant reached Goliad, he confronted Dimmitt and claimed to be "Acting Commander-in-Chief of the Federal Volunteer Army". He then tried to assume command and commandeered all the supplies that Dimmitt and his men had in their stores.

Houston, hearing of the developing crisis, attempted to resolve the situation and left for Goliad. He arrived on January 14, just in time to meet with Dimmitt as he was leaving Goliad with some of his men. Houston entered the fort at Goliad and on January 16, spoke to all the remaining troops, and tried to talk them out of continuing the campaign. Grant's men could not be dissuaded and headed for Refugio, where Johnson and other troops were gathering. Houston went along with them, while trying to gain some stature with the men.

Fannin and William Ward had also gathered a force of 200 strong, that had assembled at Velasco. On January 24, they departed and landed at Copano harbor on February 2. Fannin would press his supplies from the stores of the ships in the harbor. On February 4, he marched out to join Johnson's men at Refugio.

== Expedition ==
At Refugio, Houston again tried to persuade the men and this time his efforts met with success, as most of the men decided to break with the Matamoros campaign. Fannin, taking most of the men, would depart for Goliad and make Presidio La Bahía his headquarters, renaming it Fort Defiance. However, Grant and Johnson continued their quest towards Matamoros. As co-commanders, with about 70 to 100 men, they went as far as San Patricio to gather horses for the expedition. Grant was informed that Mexican Captain Nicolás Rodríguez and a small company formerly from Fort Lipantitlán was in the area. Grant confronted and overtook them, confiscated their horses and took the men as prisoners to San Patricio. Within a few days the prisoners had escaped, alerting nearby Mexican forces.

Splitting into smaller groups, the Texians searched for mounts and supplies, proceeding all the way to Santa Rosa Ranch. Grant and a group of fifteen Texians left to forage. While Grant was gone, Mexican General José de Urrea led a surprise attack on San Patricio in the early hours of the morning of February 27. Most of Johnson's men were killed, but Johnson narrowly escaped. Grant and his men, while foraging, were also attacked by members of General José de Urrea's cavalry. Grant was killed in the Battle of Agua Dulce at 10:30 a.m. on March 2, 1836.
