= Battle of Agua Dulce =

Skirmish during the Texas Revolution

- Part of the Texas Revolution
Date	March 2, 1836
Location	25 miles (40 km) southwest of San Patricio 27°50′51″N 97°50′59″W
Result	Mexican victory

Belligerents
Centralist Republic of Mexico	Republic of Texas

Commanders and leaders
José de Urrea	James Grant †

Strength
150 men	53 men

Casualties and losses
1 killed unknown wounded	12–15 killed 6 captured
- Location within Texas approximate location of the battle (the United States)

The battle of Agua Dulce Creek was a skirmish during the Texas Revolution between Mexican troops and the colonists of the Mexican province of Texas, known as Texians. As part of the Goliad Campaign to retake the Texas Gulf Coast, Mexican troops ambushed a group of Texians on March 2, 1836. The skirmish began approximately 26 miles (42 km) south of San Patricio, in territory belonging to the Mexican state of Tamaulipas.

When Mexico transitioned to a centralized government in 1835, supporters of federalism took up arms. Colonists in Texas revolted in October 1835 and by the end of the year had expelled all Mexican troops from their province. With hostilities temporarily suspended, Frank W. Johnson, the commander of the volunteer army in Texas, and James Grant gathered volunteers for a planned invasion of the Mexican port town of Matamoros. In late February 1836, Johnson and half of the volunteers drove a herd of horses to San Patricio, while Grant took the remaining men to gather more horses and to attempt contact with federalist sympathizers near Matamoros.

Unknown to the Texians, on February 18, Mexican General José de Urrea led a large contingent of troops from Matamoros into Texas to neutralize the rebels gathered along the coast. His troops easily defeated Johnson's small force on February 26. Several days later, informants revealed Grant's location, and on the morning of March 2, Urrea sent 150 troops to ambush the rebels. After a brief battle, the main body of the Texian and Tejano troops were defeated. Grant and two others escaped the battle and were pursued for 7 miles (11 km). Grant was killed, as were 11 men under his command. Six Texians were taken prisoner; contrary to Santa Anna's orders, Urrea did not execute them, but instead sent them to a jail in Matamoros. An additional six Texians escaped; five of them later died in the Goliad massacre.

== Background ==
Under President Antonio López de Santa Anna, the Mexican government banned slavery and immigration as it shifted away from a federalist model to a more centralized government. Santa Anna's new policies, including the ban on slavery in 1829, the ban on immigration in 1830, and the revocation of the Constitution of 1824 in early 1835 incited immigrants, slave-owners, and federalists throughout the nation to revolt. The Mexican Army quickly put down revolts in the Mexican interior, including a brutal suppression of militias in Oaxaca and Zacatecas. Unrest continued in the northeastern Mexican state of Coahuila y Tejas. The area that bordered the United States, known as Texas, was populated primarily by English-speaking settlers, known as Texians. The Texian immigrants refused to comply with Mexico's new bans on slavery, and described Santa Anna's attempts to free their slaves as "piratical attacks" to take their "property". In October, the Texians took up arms in what became known as the Texas Revolution. The following month, Texians declared themselves part of a Mexican state independent from Coahuila and created a provisional state government which permitted slavery, forbade any attempt to ban slavery, and included some principles of the Constitution of 1824, which had authorized immigration. By the end of the year, all Mexican troops had been killed or expelled from Texas.

Leading federalists in Mexico advocated a plan to attack Mexican troops in Matamoros, a major Mexican port. Members of the General Council, the interim Texas governing body, were enamored with the idea of a Matamoros Expedition. They hoped it would inspire other federalist states to revolt and keep the bored Texian troops from deserting the army. Most importantly, it would move the war zone outside Texas. The Council officially approved the plan on December 25, and on December 30 Frank W. Johnson, the commander of the volunteer army, and his aide James Grant took the bulk of the army and almost all of the supplies to Goliad to prepare for the expedition. Historian Stuart Reid posits that Grant was a British secret agent and that his efforts were an unofficial scheme to advance British interests in the region. Britain did not welcome the idea of an independent Texas, and the invasion of Matamoros was a way to tie Texas more tightly to Mexico.

Determined to quash the rebellion, Santa Anna began assembling a large force to restore order. In late December, at Santa Anna's behest, the Mexican Congress passed the Tornel Decree, declaring that any foreigners fighting against Mexican troops "will be deemed pirates and dealt with as such, being citizens of no nation presently at war with the Republic and fighting under no recognized flag." In the early nineteenth century, captured pirates were executed immediately. The resolution thus gave the Mexican Army permission to take no prisoners in the war against the Texians. (Note: Historians Jack Jackson and John Wheat in their research of Mexican government records believe that although the wording of the December 30, 1835 Tornel Decree specified "foreigners", the document was a mere formality to green-light Santa Anna's broader plan of dealing with opposition both foreign and domestic. In a letter to General Joaquín Ramírez y Sesma on February 29, 1836, Santa Anna wrote "in this war there are no prisoners". At the Battle of the Alamo prior to the final siege, he offered a three-day amnesty to allow Tejanos inside the mission to leave unharmed. At other skirmishes in the war, there is no indication either he or his generals made that distinction. Jackson and Wheat stated, "When he learned that Urrea had taken several hundred prisoners near Goliad, Santa Anna expressed his amazement that they had not been treated as pirates and swiftly executed as Tornel's decree specified. He sent more letters until the tragic deed was done." Jackson, Wheat (2005), p. 374, 377, 386–7, 390; Poyo (1996), p. 53, 58 Efficient in the Cause (Stephen L. Harden); Lindley (2003), p. 94, 134; Todish et al. (1998), pp. 137–8; Castañeda (1970), pp. 55–56; Scott (2000), p. 71) Santa Anna personally led the bulk of his troops inland to San Antonio de Béxar, and ordered General José de Urrea to lead 550 troops along the Atascocita Road toward Goliad. Urrea's efforts to quell the rebellion along the Texas Gulf Coast have become known as the Goliad Campaign.

== Prelude ==
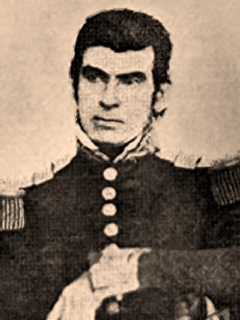
José de Urrea, commanding officer, Mexican Army

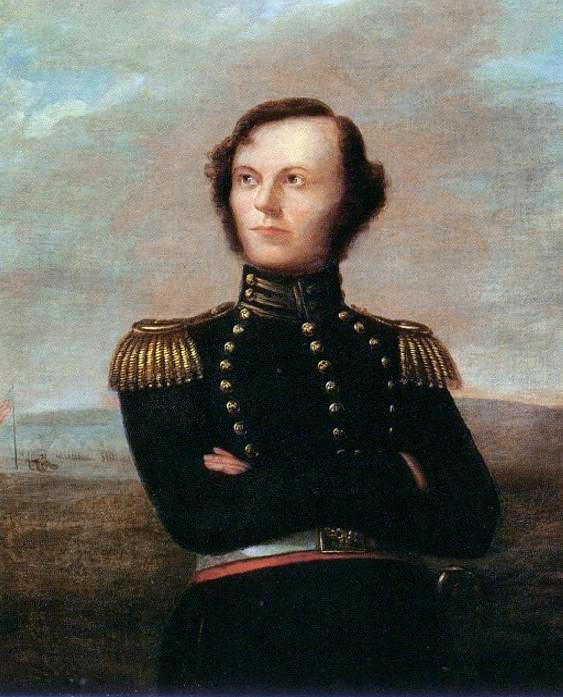
James Fannin, second-in-command to Sam Houston

The Texas provisional government had named Sam Houston the commander of a new regular army in Texas, but without authority over the volunteers who reported to Johnson. The provisional governor, Henry Smith, opposed the Matamoros Expedition and ordered Houston to find a way to disband it. In a rousing speech to the volunteers, Houston dissuaded the bulk of the men from continuing their mission. Many left the army. Others joined the troops stationed under Houston's second-in-command, James Fannin, at Presidio La Bahía in Goliad. By the end of January 1836, only 70 men remained with Johnson and Grant. Most of these volunteers were Americans or Europeans who had arrived in Texas after fighting had commenced.

Urrea reached Matamoros on January 31. A committed federalist himself, he soon convinced other federalists in the area that the Texians' ultimate goal was secession and their attempt to spark a federalist revolt in Matamoros was just a method of diverting attention from themselves. Meanwhile, Mexican double agents continued to assure Johnson and Grant that they would be able to take Matamoros easily. Urrea's force crossed into Texas on February 18.

Despite hearing rumors that the Mexican Army was approaching, Grant and Johnson chose to take their men south of the Nueces River, into territory belonging to the state of Tamaulipas, to search for horses to buy, steal, or otherwise gather. About February 21, Johnson and a small group began herding approximately 100 horses back into Texas. The rest of the men remained with Grant, ostensibly to look for more horses. In actuality, he was attempting to rendezvous with his allies near Matamoros to determine whether federalists were still willing to rise up against the Mexican Army.

Mexican troops arrived in San Patricio in the early hours of February 26. After a fifteen-minute battle, Johnson's men were defeated; six Texians, including Johnson, escaped, and the remainder were killed or captured. While Urrea waited for reinforcements before beginning his march towards Goliad, his advance party searched for Grant and the remaining Texians. Unaware of Johnson's fate, on February 27 Grant and his party began their march northward to San Patricio, driving a herd of several hundred horses he had purchased. The men camped along San Fernando Creek on March 1. Local ranchers welcomed them, but that night sent a messenger to Urrea with Grant's location and plans.

== Battle ==
Mexican troops marched overnight towards El Puerto de los Cuates de Agua Dulce, a well-known crossing point on Agua Dulce Creek. Approximately 26 miles (42 km) south of San Patricio, about 1 mile (1.6 km) from Banquete, and just north of modern-day Kingsville, Mexican soldiers took cover in two groves of trees. Urrea had approximately 150 troops, including 80 dragoons.

Grant's company comprised about 53 men, including a large contingent of Tejanos (Mexican-born residents of Texas) under the command of Plácido Benavides. The men were in good spirits and rode at an easy pace towards San Patricio. Grant, Benavides, and Ruben Brown rode 0.5 miles (0.80 km) ahead of the main body of Texians and saw no signs of Mexican soldiers.

Between 10 and 11 am, as the bulk of the Texians reached the trees, the Mexican cavalry attacked. Taken completely unaware, many of the Texians were shot before they were able to raise their guns. As they tried to flee, dragoons chased them down and lanced them off their horses. Five Texians dismounted and made a run for a small village nearby, hoping to gain cover so they could use their rifles. Urrea sent the infantry after them. Two of those Texians were captured and the rest escaped.

Grant, Benavides, and Brown turned back to join the other Texians. Once in the battle, Brown dismounted, either to reload his rifle or because his horse was killed. Seeing that the battle was lost, Grant pulled Brown onto another horse, and the two of them and Benavides turned to flee. Mexican cavalry attempted to stop them; Grant shot one officer and he and Benavides then galloped past that officer's horse. At this point, the herd stampeded, forcing the Mexican cavalry aside. The three Texians followed the horses. Mexican soldiers promptly gave chase. According to Brown's later recollection, both his and Grant's horses were wounded as Mexican soldiers fired after them.

The three Texians ran for 6–7 miles (9.7–11.3 km), occasionally firing their pistols to force Mexican dragoons to stay back. Mexican soldiers yelled that the men would be spared if they surrendered, but none of the Texians believed them. Benavides had the strongest mount, and Grant ordered him to go ahead to warn Fannin that the Mexican Army was close to Goliad. Grant and Brown were surrounded and forced to stop. Grant killed a Mexican soldier who drove a lance through Brown's arm. Between ten and twelve Mexican soldiers then surrounded Grant, and he died after being pierced multiple times. Historian Stuart Reid theorizes that Mexican soldiers were eager to ensure Grant did not survive the battle. Grant could identify federalist sympathizers in Matamoros and the surrounding areas, and his knowledge potentially put Urrea and some of his federalist-sympathizing troops at risk.

Brown threw his empty pistol at one Mexican officer, then grabbed the lance from the man Grant had shot and used it to defend himself. After soldiers lassoed him, Brown surrendered and was taken captive. Brown was then brought back to the site of the ambush. He recalled that one severely injured Texian, Joseph Carpenter, was lying in the dirt, begging for his life. Brown then saw a Mexican soldier shoot him.

== Aftermath ==
Although Urrea reported that 42 Texians were killed, early 20th century historians generally only list 12 Texians as killed. Tejano involvement in the revolution had been notably absent from textbooks until the 1970s, so it is likely that historians were not including the Tejanos under Benavides. Six Texians were taken prisoner. In defiance of the Tornel Decree, Urrea spared those who surrendered and sent them to a prison in Matamoros. Reports indicated that Urrea offered clemency after the intervention of Francita Alavez, the mistress of one of Urrea's soldiers. Six Texians escaped. Five of these joined Fannin's garrison at Goliad and were later killed in the Goliad massacre. No reports of Mexican losses have been found, although at least one Mexican soldier is thought to have died. After the battle, Mexican soldiers rounded up the horses that the Texians had been herding and kept them. The battle marked the end of the Matamoros Expedition. Although it occurred on the same day that Texas declared independence, Grant and his men did not know that they were fighting for the new Republic of Texas.

According to historian Stephen Hardin, this battle proved that the Texians did not fight well on open prairies. News of the battle reached Fannin on March 4. Urrea's imminent arrival worried Fannin, who feared that Santa Anna would lead his troops from San Antonio de Béxar towards Goliad, essentially trapping Fannin and his men between the two branches of the Mexican Army. Fannin wrote to the Acting Governor, James Robinson, "I am a better judge of my military abilities than others, and if I am qualified to command an Army, I have not found it out." The acting Texas government nonetheless left Fannin in charge of the fort at Goliad, instructing him to determine whether it was best to retreat or make a stand. Fannin delayed making a decision, finally choosing to leave Goliad on March 19. Urrea's troops trapped Fannin's men on an open prairie. The Texians surrendered after the Battle of Coleto and most, including Colonel Fannin, were executed a week later in the Goliad massacre.

== See also ==
- Timeline of the Texas Revolution

== Bibliography ==
- Castañeda, Carlos E (1970). The Mexican Side of the Texan revolution, 1836, by the Chief Mexican Participants. Austin, TX: Graphic Ideas, Inc. OCLC 695593957.
- Davis, William C. (2006). Lone Star Rising. College Station, TX: Texas A&M University Press. ISBN 978-1-58544-532-5. originally published 2004 by New York: Free Press
- Graham, Don (July 1985). "Remembering the Alamo: The Story of the Texas Revolution in Popular Culture". The Southwestern Historical Quarterly. 89: 35–67.
- Groneman, Bill (1998). Battlefields of Texas. Plano, TX: Republic of Texas Press. ISBN 978-1-55622-571-0. OCLC 37935129..
- Hardin, Stephen L. (1994). Texian Iliad – A Military History of the Texas Revolution. Austin, TX: University of Texas Press. ISBN 0-292-73086-1. OCLC 29704011..
- Jackson, Jack; Wheat, John (2005). Almonte's Texas: Juan N. Almonte's 1834 Inspection, Secret Report & Role in the 1836 Campaign. Denton, TX: Texas State Historical Association. ISBN 978-0-87611-207-6.
- Lack, Paul D. (1992). The Texas Revolutionary Experience: A Political and Social History 1835–1836. College Station, TX: Texas A&M University Press. ISBN 0-89096-497-1.
- Lindley, Thomas Ricks (2003). Alamo Traces: New Evidence and New Conclusions. Plano, TX: Republic of Texas Press. ISBN 1-55622-983-6.
- Poyo, Gerald Eugene (1996). Tejano Journey, 1770–1850. Austin, TX: University of Texas Press. ISBN 978-0-292-76570-2.
- Reid, Stuart (2007). The Secret War for Texas. Elma Dill Russell Spencer Series in the West and Southwest. College Station, TX: Texas A&M University Press. ISBN 978-1-58544-565-3.
- Roell, Craig H (2013). Matamoros and the Texas Revolution. Denton, TX: Texas State Historical Association. ISBN 978-0-87611-260-1.
- Scott, Robert (2000). After the Alamo. Plano, TX: Republic of Texas Press. ISBN 978-1-55622-691-5.
- Stuart, Jay (2008). Slaughter at Goliad: The Mexican Massacre of 400 Texas Volunteers. Annapolis, MD: Naval Institute Press. ISBN 978-1-59114-843-2.
- Todish, Timothy J.; Todish, Terry; Spring, Ted (1998). Alamo Sourcebook, 1836: A Comprehensive Guide to the Battle of the Alamo and the Texas Revolution. Austin, TX: Eakin Press. ISBN 978-1-57168-152-2.
