= San Patricio, Texas =

- City
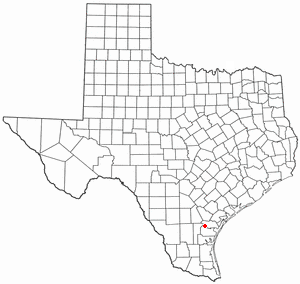
- Location of San Patricio, Texas

- Coordinates: 27°57′33″N 97°46′23″W
- Country: United States
- State: Texas
- County: San Patricio

Area
  - Total: 3.89 sq mi (10.07 km^{2})
  - Land: 3.85 sq mi (9.97 km^{2})
  - Water: 0.039 sq mi (0.10 km^{2})
- Elevation: 43 ft (13 m)

Population (2020)
  - Total: 384
  - Density: 97.5/sq mi (37.63/km^{2})
- Time zone: UTC-6 (Central (CST))
  - Summer (DST): UTC-5 (CDT)
- ZIP code: 78368
- Area code: 361
- FIPS code: 48-65612
- GNIS feature ID: 1346436

San Patricio is a city in San Patricio County in the U.S. state of Texas. The population was 384 at the 2020 census.

In the 2000 U.S. census, a portion of San Patricio was indicated as being in Nueces County. As of the 1990 U.S. census, the 2010 U.S. census, and the 2020 U.S. census, that particular area is indicated as being in San Patricio County.

== Geography ==
According to the United States Census Bureau, San Patricio, located at 27°57′33″N 97°46′23″W (27.959196, -97.773134), has a total area of 3.9 square miles (10.0 km^{2}), of which 3.8 square miles (9.9 km^{2}) is land and 0.04 square mile (0.1 km^{2}) (1.03%) is water.

== History ==
The town was founded in 1829 by empresarios James McGloin and John McMullen. They had received approval from the Mexican government to settle 200 Irish Catholic families on the land—the name meaning Saint Patrick, the patron saint of Ireland. Empresario James Power was involved as well.

The Battle of San Patricio was fought near the town in 1836 during the Texas Revolution.

With the approval of the General Council, Texas revolutionaries James Grant, Frank W. Johnson and Robert C. Morris collaborated on plans to lead an assault on the Mexican town of Matamoros. Recruiting some 300 men, several of whom were native to San Antonio, they gathered provisions from the Alamo and Presidio La Bahia for their expedition. The men needed mounts for their long journey and divided into groups as they traveled toward the coast to capture wild horses.

On February 27, 1836, Mexican General José de Urrea's advanced reconnaissance patrol discovered Frank W. Johnson and about 34 Texians camped at the abandoned Irish settlement of San Patricio. In a surprise attack at 3:30am, Mexican troops fired on the Texian Army and killed about 10 (7 of them Hispanics) and captured 18. Johnson and four others who were captured managed to escape and rejoin James Fannin's command at Goliad. One man, Daniel J. Toler, escaped capture. The men killed were buried in the Old Cemetery on the Hill in San Patricio.

Grant and Morris's party was also surprised by Urrea's army as they camped at Agua Dulce Creek. On March 2, the Mexicans surprised them, killing both Grant and Morris and twelve others. The survivors were taken captured and imprisoned at Matamoros.

In 1846, San Patricio became the second county seat of San Patricio County after Nueces County was partitioned from San Patricio County. In 1893, the county seat was moved to Sinton.

== Demographics ==
Historical population
Census	Pop.	Note	%±
1880	238		—
1890	315		32.4%
1980	210		—
1990	369		75.7%
2000	318		−13.8%
2010	395		24.2%
2020	384		−2.8%
U.S. Decennial Census 2020

=== 2020 census ===
San Patricio racial composition (NH = Non-Hispanic) (Note: Note: the US Census treats Hispanic/Latino as an ethnic category. This table excludes Latinos from the racial categories and assigns them to a separate category. Hispanics/Latinos can be of any race.)
Race	Number	Percentage
White (NH)	191	49.74%
Asian (NH)	1	0.26%
Some Other Race (NH)	2	0.52%
Mixed/Multi-Racial (NH)	13	3.39%
Hispanic or Latino	177	46.09%
Total	384	

As of the 2020 census, San Patricio had a population of 384. The median age was 45.2 years; 22.1% of residents were under the age of 18 and 18.0% of residents were 65 years of age or older. For every 100 females there were 95.9 males, and for every 100 females age 18 and over there were 98.0 males age 18 and over.

0.0% of residents lived in urban areas, while 100.0% lived in rural areas.

There were 138 households in San Patricio, of which 39.1% had children under the age of 18 living in them. Of all households, 58.7% were married-couple households, 11.6% were households with a male householder and no spouse or partner present, and 19.6% were households with a female householder and no spouse or partner present. About 10.1% of all households were made up of individuals and 4.3% had someone living alone who was 65 years of age or older.

There were 157 housing units, of which 12.1% were vacant. The homeowner vacancy rate was 3.1% and the rental vacancy rate was 0.0%.

=== 2000 census ===
As of the census of 2000, there were 318 people, 113 households, and 89 families residing in the city. The population density was 82.7 inhabitants per square mile (31.9/km^{2}). There were 124 housing units at an average density of 32.3 per square mile (12.5/km^{2}). The racial makeup of the city was 81.45% White, 0.94% African American, 0.63% Native American, 14.47% from other races, and 2.52% from two or more races. Hispanic or Latino of any race were 39.94% of the population.

There were 113 households, out of which 42.5% had children under the age of 18 living with them, 64.6% were married couples living together, 8.8% had a female householder with no husband present, and 21.2% were non-families. 18.6% of all households were made up of individuals, and 8.8% had someone living alone who was 65 years of age or older. The average household size was 2.81 and the average family size was 3.22.

The population in the city was spread out, with 33.0% under the age of 18, 4.4% from 18 to 24, 33.3% from 25 to 44, 19.8% from 45 to 64, and 9.4% who were 65 years of age or older; the median age was 36 years. For every 100 females, there were 102.5 males. For every 100 females age 18 and over, there were 91.9 males.

The median income for a household in the city was $32,386, and the median income for a family was $40,313. Males had a median income of $31,250 versus $19,063 for females. The per capita income for the city was $13,531. About 12.6% of families and 14.9% of the population were below the poverty line, including 17.9% of those under age 18 and 14.7% of those age 65 or over.

== Education ==
The City of San Patricio is served by the Mathis Independent School District.
