= Amon B. King =

American military officer (1807–1836)

- Born: Amon Butler King; 1807; Baltimore, Maryland, US
- Died: March 27, 1836 (aged 28–29); Goliad, Mexican Texas
- Relatives: Alpheus Hyatt (nephew)
- Military career
- Allegiance: Republic of Texas
- Branch: Texian Army
- Rank: Captain
- Conflicts: Texas Revolution; Battle of Refugio

Amon Butler King (erroneously Aaron; 1807 – March 27, 1836) was an American military officer. He served in the Texas Revolution, commanding in the Battle of Refugio. He was killed in the Goliad massacre.

== Biography ==
King was born in 1807, in Baltimore, the son of John King and Mary Ann (née Butler) King. His father later died, and his mother married Joseph Camp. He was the uncle of natural scientist Alpheus Hyatt. In 1827, he travelled west and worked as a fur trader. He moved to Paducah, Kentucky in 1832 serving as its marshall from 1833 until late October 1835.

King, alongside c. 18 other Paducah residents, joined Peyton Sterling Wyatt on his journey to participate in the Texas Revolution. He formed and commanded the Paducah Volunteers, a company created from a number of those who joined Wyatt. On December 8, 1835, the men arrived at Nacogdoches, Texas, then at Washington-on-the-Brazos on December 25, where they received orders from Sam Houston.

In the first week of January 1836, King and his men were stationed in Refugio. They were transferred to Goliad from March 1 to March 10 before returning. After their return, they participated in the Battle of Refugio, alongside the company of William Ward. The battle ended in a Mexican victory, with all Texan soldiers – including King – being marched out of their fortification as prisoners of war. The men were killed on March 27, 1836, as part of the Goliad massacre. King was aged 28 or 29.

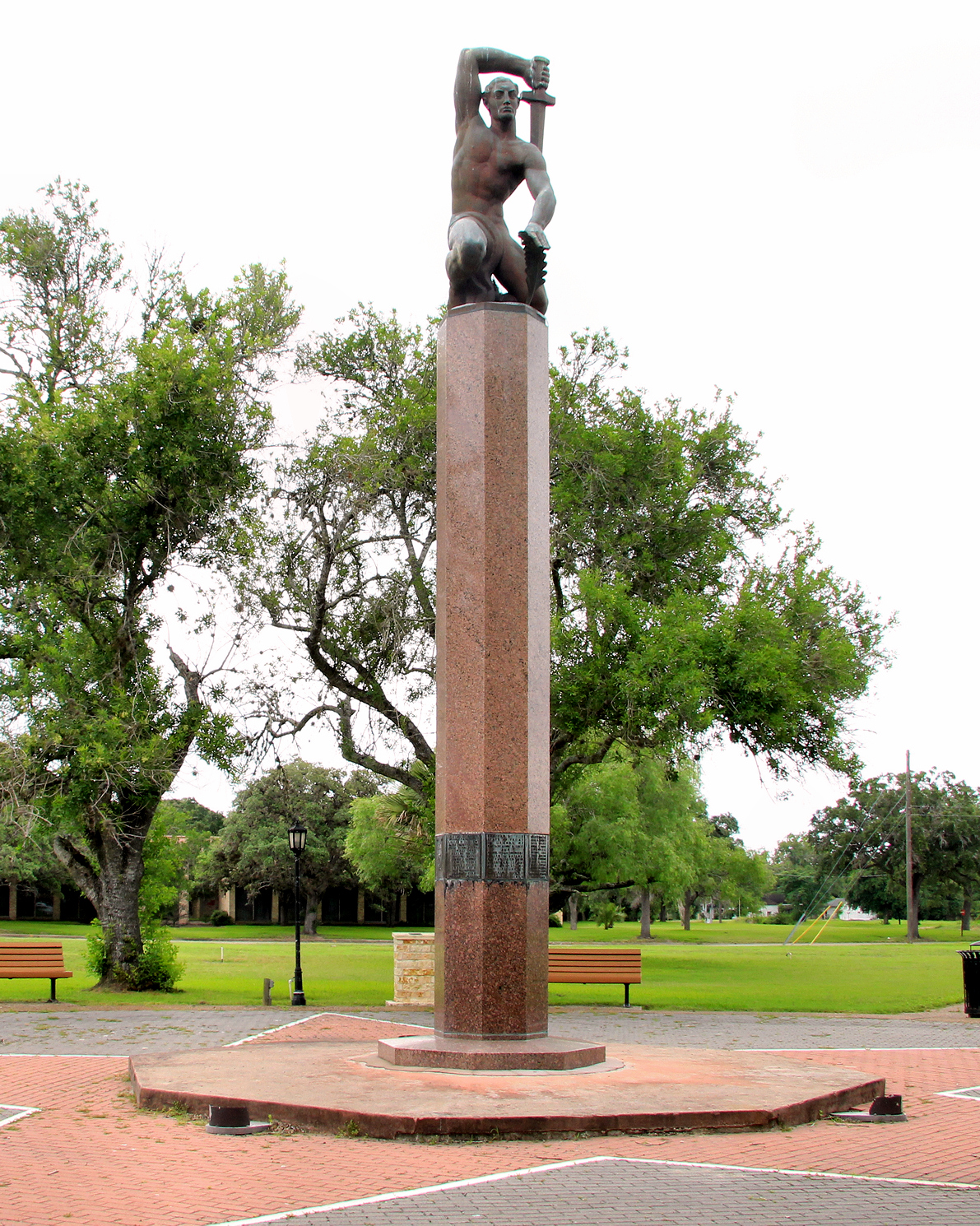
The Monument to Amon B. King and His Men in Refugio, Texas.

King's body was originally left unburied in a prairie, though was buried at the Mount Calvary Catholic Cemetery by Refugio residents following the Battle of San Jacinto. The tombstones in which King and his men were in, were forgotten about until May 9, 1934, after which ceremonies were held. In 1936, monuments to King and his men were erected at Mount Calvary Cemetery in Refugio. On July 27, 2018, the monument was added to the National Register of Historic Places. The King's Memorial State Park was named for him. An erroneous name, Aaron B. King, was retroactively attached to him due to a Virginia land dispute trial which involved an Aaron B. King, an unrelated individual.
