= Battle of San Patricio =

1836 battle in the Texas Revolution

- Part of the Texas Revolution
Date	February 27, 1836
Location	near San Patricio, Texas 27.9592°N 97.7730°W
Result	Mexican victory

Belligerents
Mexico	Texian Rebels

Commanders and leaders
José de Urrea	Frank W. Johnson

Strength
200 men	43 men

Casualties and losses
1 killed; 4 wounded	16 killed 21 captured
- Location within Texas

The Battle of San Patricio was fought on February 27, 1836, between Texian rebels and the Mexican army, during the Texas Revolution. The battle occurred as a result of the outgrowth of the Texian Matamoros Expedition. The battle marked the start of the Goliad Campaign, the Mexican offensive to retake the Texas Gulf Coast. It took place in and around San Patricio.

By the end of 1835, all Mexican troops had been driven from Texas. Frank W. Johnson, the commander of the volunteer army in Texas, and James Grant gathered volunteers for a planned invasion of the Mexican port town of Matamoros. In February 1836, Johnson and about 40 men led a herd of horses to San Patricio in preparation for the expedition. Johnson assigned some of his troops to a ranch 4 miles (6.4 km) outside town to guard the horses, while the rest of his men garrisoned in three different locations in town.

Unbeknownst to the Texians, on February 18 Mexican General José de Urrea had led a large contingent of troops from Matamoros into Texas. Their goal was to neutralize the Texian soldiers gathered along the coast. Urrea's men easily followed the trail left by Johnson's herd of horses. Mexican soldiers surprised the sleeping Texians in San Patricio in the early hours of February 27. After a fifteen-minute battle, all but six Texians had been killed or imprisoned. One Mexican soldier was killed and four injured.

== Background ==
Under President Antonio López de Santa Anna, the Mexican government banned slavery and immigration as it shifted away from a federalist model to a more centralized government. Santa Anna's new policies, including the ban on slavery in 1829, the ban on immigration in 1830, and the revocation of the Constitution of 1824 in early 1835 incited immigrants, slave-owners, and federalists throughout the nation to revolt. The Mexican Army quickly put down revolts in the Mexican interior, including a brutal suppression of militias in Oaxaca and Zacatecas. Unrest continued in the northeastern Mexican state of Coahuila y Tejas. The area that bordered the United States, known as Texas, was populated primarily by English-speaking settlers, known as Texians. The Texian immigrants refused to comply with Mexico's new bans on slavery, and described Santa Anna's attempts to free their slaves as "piratical attacks" to take their "property". In October, the Texians took up arms in what became known as the Texas Revolution. The following month, Texians declared themselves part of a Mexican state independent from Coahuila and created a provisional state government which permitted slavery, forbade any attempt to ban slavery, and included some principles of the Constitution of 1824, which had authorized immigration. By the end of the year, all Mexican troops had been killed or expelled from Texas.

Leading federalists in Mexico advocated a plan to attack Mexican troops in Matamoros, a major Mexican port. Members of the General Council, the interim Texas governing body, were enamored with the idea of a Matamoros Expedition. They hoped it would inspire other federalist states to revolt and keep the bored Texian troops from deserting the army. Most importantly, it would move the war zone outside Texas. The Council officially approved the plan on December 25, and on December 30 Frank W. Johnson, the commander of the volunteer army, and his aide James Grant took the bulk of the army and almost all of the supplies to Goliad to prepare for the expedition.

Determined to quash the rebellion, Santa Anna began assembling a large force to restore order; by the end of 1835, his army numbered 6,019 soldiers. In late December, at his behest, Congress passed the Tornel Decree, declaring that any foreigners fighting against Mexican troops "will be deemed pirates and dealt with as such, being citizens of no nation presently at war with the Republic and fighting under no recognized flag". In the early 19th century, captured pirates were executed immediately. The resolution thus gave the Mexican Army permission to take no prisoners in the war against the Texians. Santa Anna personally led the bulk of his troops inland to San Antonio de Béxar and ordered General José de Urrea to lead 550 troops along the Atascocita Road toward Goliad. Urrea's efforts to quell the rebellion along the Texas Gulf Coast have become known as the Goliad Campaign.

== Prelude ==
The Texas provisional government had named Sam Houston the commander of a new regular army in Texas, but without authority over the volunteers who reported to Johnson. The provisional Governor Henry Smith opposed the Matamoros Expedition and ordered Houston to find a way to disband it. In a rousing speech to the volunteers, Houston dissuaded the bulk of the men from continuing their mission. Many left the army, while others joined the troops stationed under Houston's second-in-command, James Fannin, at Presidio La Bahia in Goliad. By the end of January 1836, only 70 men remained with Johnson and Grant. Most of these volunteers were Americans or Europeans who had arrived in Texas after the Texas Revolution had commenced.

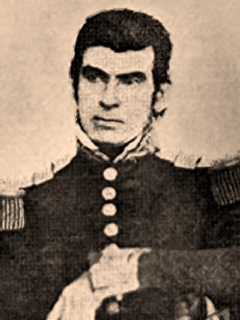
General José de Urrea

Urrea reached Matamoros on January 31. A committed federalist, he soon convinced other federalists in the area that the Texians' ultimate goal was secession, and their attempt to spark a federalist revolt in Matamoros was just a method of diverting attention from themselves. Urrea's force crossed into Texas on February 18. Meanwhile, Mexican double agents continued to assure Johnson and Grant that they would be able to take Matamoros easily. Despite hearing rumors that the Mexican army was approaching, Grant and Johnson chose to take their men south of the Nueces River, into territory belonging to the state of Tamaulipas, to search for horses to buy, steal, or otherwise gather. About February 21, Johnson and part of the group began driving about 100 horses back into Texas. The rest of the men remained with Grant, ostensibly to look for more horses. In actuality, he was attempting to rendezvous with his allies near Matamoros to determine whether federalists were still willing to rise up against the Mexican army.

Johnson's men arrived on February 24 in San Patricio, an Irish settlement about 100 miles (160 km) north of Matamoros. Many of the San Patricio residents were centralists, loyal to the Mexican government. Johnson sent twelve men to guard the horses at the ranch of Julian de la Garza, approximately 4 miles (6.4 km) outside the town, while the rest garrisoned in San Patricio. The weather was frigid, and the men's clothes were threadbare. Confident that Grant would alert him if Mexican troops were in the area, Johnson chose not to appoint sentries, instead allowing all of the men to take shelter.

The Mexican troops easily followed the trail left by Johnson's herd. On February 25, Urrea led 100 dragoons and 100 infantry to corner the Texians. By 10 p.m., scouts reported that Texian troops were established in San Patricio. The Mexican soldiers continued marching through the cold night; six of the troops died of exposure.

== Battle ==
Urrea instructed three officers to go to San Patricio dressed as civilians and warn the centralists that the Mexican army was approaching. In an effort to reduce casualties and property damage, centralists were asked to declare their loyalties by leaving lanterns burning in their windows. Locals also gave the officers precise information on which buildings housed Texian soldiers. Urrea sent 30 men under Captain Rafael Pretalia to de la Garza's ranch to surprise the Texians camped there. At 3:30 a.m. on February 26, the remaining Mexican soldiers entered San Patricio.

One group of Texians surrendered immediately when they awoke to find themselves surrounded by Mexican troops. When another party of Texians was asked to surrender, they instead opened fire, killing a Mexican officer and wounding two other soldiers. Determined to prevent more casualties, Mexican dragoons prepared to set the house on fire to force the Texians out. At this point, several Texians called that they were surrendering. As they left the house, they were shot or lanced.

By chance, Johnson and three of his men, Lieutenant Daniel Toler and Sergeants Love and Miller, were still awake and discussing tactics. Mexican troops had been told that the house where Johnson was quartered was one of their targets, yet a lamp burned in the window, signaling that this was the home of a loyalist. Out of an abundance of caution, a group of troops knocked on the door. Before the Texians could open the door, they heard the gunfire from the town square. Toler looked out a window and saw uniformed troops on the porch. Without opening the door, he told the soldiers, in Spanish, that there were no troops there, but he would open the door momentarily. The fighting moved into the street, and soldiers who had been guarding the back door of the house rushed around to the front. Johnson, Toler, Love, and Miller dashed out the back door and escaped.

At the de la Garza ranch, the Texians had been taking turns standing sentry. In the cold, all of the sentries had fallen asleep. Pretalia's soldiers opened fire on the sleeping men, injuring two Texians. In the subsequent fight, four Texians died, eight men (three Americans and five Tejanos, Mexican-Ethnicity Texans) were taken prisoner, and several escaped.

The fighting ended within fifteen minutes.

== Aftermath ==
Six Texians escaped, including Johnson, Toler, Miller, Love, and John F. Beck. They made their way on foot to Refugio, where they sent a messenger to Fannin at Goliad, 75 miles (121 km) north, to let him know that Urrea's army was close. The survivors reached Goliad on February 29. After filling out an official report on the battle, Johnson, Toler, and Love left the army and went to San Felipe. The remaining survivors joined Fannin's troops and were later killed in the Goliad Massacre.

Eleven Texians were killed outright, five suffered mortal wounds, and 21 others were taken prisoner. Six local men were also arrested for aiding the rebellion. Some historians report that most were executed immediately in the town square. According to reports by Johnson and another Texian, Urrea questioned several of the prisoners, and there were reports that the men were tortured. Within 72 hours all of the prisoners were dead. One Mexican soldier was killed and four were wounded.

Urrea's official records state that the battle was fought at Fort Lipantitlán, on the other side of the Nueces River. Texian accounts are consistent that the fighting occurred in town and at the de la Garza ranch. While Urrea waited for reinforcements before beginning his march towards Goliad, his advance party searched for Grant and the remaining Texians. After learning of Grant's whereabouts from local spies, on March 2 Mexican dragoons ambushed the Texians at Agua Dulce Creek.

== See also ==
- List of Texas Revolution battles
- Timeline of the Texas Revolution
