= William Ward (Texas soldier) =

American lieutenant-colonel during the Texas Revolution

- Born: unknown Macon, Georgia
- Died: March 27, 1836; Goliad, Texas
- Military career
- Allegiance: Republic of Texas
- Branch: (Republic of Texas) Texian Army
- Service years: 1835-1836
- Rank: Major, Lieutenant Colonel
- Conflicts: Battle of Refugio
- Other work: Goliad Massacre

William Ward (ca.? – 1836), was a Macon, Georgia native, who answered the appeal from Texas, during the Texas Revolution. He recruited men from Georgia and led the Georgia Battalion.

== Georgia native ==
William Ward and Dr. Robert Collins first held a public meeting in Macon on November 12, 1835, to organize an infantry battalion in answer to the plea from Texas to join the Texas Revolution.

== Texas Revolution ==
Ward recruited 120 men from Milledgeville, Columbus, and Macon, Georgia. From these 120 men, he formed them into three companies. With the use of the Georgia State arsenal, he personally armed, supplied, and booked passage for them to Texas at his own expense. Ward passed through Georgia to New Orleans adding recruits along the way, numbering 220 by the time they set sail for Texas. James Fannin, a Georgian himself, personally met the group in Velasco, Texas, on December 20, 1835. Ward was elected as major in Texas service.

On February 7, 1836, Ward and his troops officially formed the Georgia Battalion at Refugio, Texas and he was elected lieutenant colonel. On February 12, the Georgia Battalion traveled with Fannin to Goliad. It was here at Fort Defiance, that they would serve Texas. Ward would serve as a member of Fannin's staff through March 12.

On March 13, Fannin ordered Ward and the Georgia Battalion to go to the aid of Amon B. King's and his company, who were besieged in the Nuestra Señora del Refugio Mission in Refugio. Although successful in breaking up the siege on the 13th, the arrival of Ward at Refugio initiated a conflict over command between the two officers. This in-fighting caused the insurgents to break into several smaller detachments. King would now leave and attack a nearby ranch, believed to be Centralistas. Ward was left defending the Mission. When Mexican forces neared 1500 and thus became overwhelming, the Texians fled the battle during the night.

On March 22, Ward and the Georgia Battalion (80 men plus Ward), surrendered after escaping from the Battle of Refugio. About 26 men were retained at Victoria as laborers, but 55 prisoners were marched into Goliad, on March 25. Ward and his captured battalion were executed on March 27, 1836, in the Goliad Massacre.

== See also ==
- List of Texas Revolution battles
- Timeline of the Texas Revolution

== Citations ==
- Castaneda, H.W. (1970), The Mexican Side of the Texan Revolution, Texas: Graphic Ideas, ASIN B003M0PG1S
- Edmondson, J.R. (2000), The Alamo Story-From History to Current Conflicts, Plano, TX: Republic of Texas Press, ISBN 1-55622-678-0, OCLC 42842410
- Groneman, Bill (1998), Battlefields of Texas, Plano, TX: Republic of Texas Press, ISBN 978-1-55622-571-0, OCLC 37935129
- Hardin, Stephen L. (1994), Texian Iliad – A Military History of the Texas Revolution, Austin, TX: University of Texas Press, ISBN 0-292-73086-1, OCLC 29704011
- Todish, Timothy J.; Todish, Terry; Spring, Ted (1998), Alamo Sourcebook, 1836: A Comprehensive Guide to the Battle of the Alamo and the Texas Revolution, Austin, TX: Eakin Press, ISBN 978-1-57168-152-2
