= Francita Alavez =

Revolutionary during the Texas Revolution

Francita Alavez (c. 1816 – c. 1906) was known as the "Angel of Goliad," for saving the lives of Texas prisoners of war in the Goliad massacre and at Copano and Victoria, Texas, by interceding on their behalf and persuading the help of Mexican officials. Her husband, Captain Telesforo Alavez led the Mexicans in the Copano and Victoria region under General José de Urrea.

== Early life ==
Francita's definite date and town of birth are not known. Even her real name has been referred to differently at times, such as Panchita, Francisca, Pancheta, or Francita, and her surname as Alevesco, Alvárez, or Alavez.

== Texas revolution ==
During the Texas Revolution, she did travel to Texas in 1836, as a companion of her husband Captain Telesforo Alavez, who had sailed to Texas from Matamoros, Mexico to El Cópano port at Copano Bay, Texas.

== An Angel of mercy ==
At El Cópano, she combined her compassion for humanity with her strong willed personality to influence important Mexican officials to treat the Texian prisoners humanely. When 80 soldiers of Major William Parsons Miller and the Nashville Battalion were captured by Urrea's soldiers, she influenced the Mexican soldiers to untie the men's hands and to give them something to eat.

In La Bahia (Goliad), due to her intervention and the courageous effort of Colonel Francisco Garay, 20 more men were held and spared as doctors, interpreters, or workers. Francita entered the presidio the night before the massacre, bringing several men out with her and hiding them until after the Goliad Massacre. She also made sure the 80 men from Miller's group were not executed.

In Victoria, where her husband was left in charge, she saw to it that the 26 Texans builders and workers there would be released and not executed.

== Aftermath ==
After the defeat of Santa Anna, Francita returned with Captain Alavez to Matamoros. At the prison in Matamoros, she continued to support the Texians imprisoned there. When Captain Alavez left for Mexico City, Francita went with him. But their relationship soon ended. She then left Mexico City and returned to Matamoros. While broke and down on her luck, she was befriended by Texians who knew of her humanitarian acts. The 1936 memoirs of Elena O'Shea, a King Ranch schoolteacher, claim that Francita Alavez traveled back to Texas with her new friends, where she was employed to work on the ranch.

== Citations ==
- Hardin, Stephen L. (1994). Texian Iliad – A Military History of the Texas Revolution. Austin, TX: University of Texas Press. ISBN 0-292-73086-1. OCLC 29704011.
- Davenport, Harbert & Roell, Craig H. "Goliad Massacre". Handbook of Texas Online.
