= Battle of Coleto =

1836 battle of the Texas Revolution

Coordinates: 28.6863°N 97.2334°W

Battle of Coleto ( Battle of Coleto Creek)
- Part of Texas Revolution, and the Goliad campaign
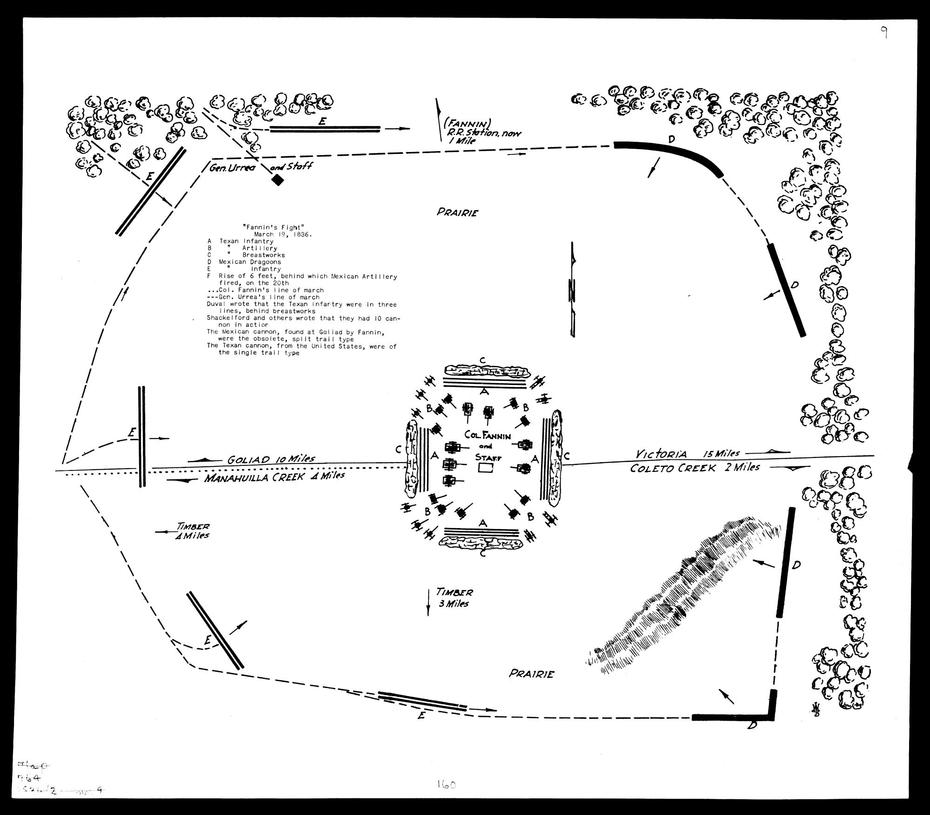
- Positions of the forces at the Battle of Coleto.
Date	March 19–20, 1836
Location	Goliad County, Texas
Result	Mexican victory

Belligerents
Mexico	Republic of Texas

Commanders and leaders
José de Urrea	James Fannin (POW)

Strength
19th: 80 cavalrymen, 260 infantrymen, 20th: 800–900 infantrymen	450 men, 9 cannons

Casualties and losses
No Data	•At least 10 killed, 67 wounded during the battle •The rest were captured and then killed at the Goliad Massacre

The Battle of Coleto, also known as the Battle of Coleto Creek, the Battle of the Prairie, and the Batalla del Encinal del Perdido, was fought on March 19–20, 1836, during the Goliad campaign of the Texas Revolution. In February, General José de Urrea led a branch of the Mexican army up the Gulf Coast of Mexican Texas toward Goliad, where a large contingent of soldiers from the Texian Army was garrisoned under Colonel James W. Fannin. Simultaneously, Mexican president Antonio Lopez de Santa Anna led a larger force into the Texian interior, where on March 6 his troops won the Battle of the Alamo. After learning of the Alamo's defeat, Texian general Sam Houston ordered Fannin to retreat from Goliad and join the rest of the army in Victoria.

On March 19, Fannin led his men on a leisurely retreat from Goliad. Mexican troops surrounded the Texians later in the day before Fannin could reach the shelter of a grove of timber at Coleto Creek, some 400 yards (370 m) away. Texians formed a square in the middle of the prairie and attempted to defend their position. Although Mexican troops launched three separate attacks against the square, they could not penetrate the Texian position. As night fell, Mexican sharpshooters were able to wound and kill more Texians. With little water to give to the wounded or to cool their artillery, the Texians felt they were unable to withstand further fighting. On the morning of March 20, the Texians surrendered.

Urrea attempted to secure honorable terms for his Texian prisoners. However, Santa Anna had received authorization from the Mexican Congress to treat all captured Texian troops as pirates rather than prisoners-of-war. Under orders from Santa Anna, and despite the appeals for clemency by General José de Urrea, the massacre was reluctantly carried out by Lt. Colonel José Nicolás de la Portilla.

== Background ==
Colonel James Fannin was the commander of the Texan troops at Fort Defiance in late 1835 and early 1836. During the siege of the Alamo in February 1836 he attempted a march of 100 miles to relieve the Texan forces at the Alamo but due to poor preparation for the journey and word that general Urrea's Mexican forces were approaching Goliad, he turned back. After the Alamo fell to Santa Anna's forces the Texians received orders from General Sam Houston to fall back to Victoria. Fannin therefore abandoned the fort but proceeded without adequate supplies and without haste on his retreat.

== Prelude ==
By 09:00 on March 19 they began their retreat from Goliad, during a period of heavy fog. The Texian force included the San Antonio Greys, the Red Rovers, the Mustangs commanded by Burr H. Duval, a militia from Refugio commanded by Hugh McDonald Frazer, Texian regular soldiers commanded by Ira Westover, and the Mobile Greys. Nine heavy artillery pieces with different calibers were ordered by Fannin to be taken by the Texians, along with 1000 muskets, but he neglected to ensure that a good amount of food and water was transported. Carts loaded with heavy equipment were being pulled by hungry and tired oxen. Urrea did not realize the Texians had left until 11:00. The two-hour lead was removed, when a Texian cart crossing the San Antonio River broke, a cannon had to be brought out of the river, and Fannin ordered that the oxen be allowed to graze for a period of time after the Texians had proceeded about a mile past Manahuilla Creek, resulting in the retreat being stopped. John Shackelford, Burr H. Duval, and Ira Westover opposed Fannin's decision to allow the oxen to graze, arguing that they should continue their retreat until they reached the protection of the Coleto Creek timber. Shackelford would state that Fannin argued that the Mexican army against them was poor, and that Urrea would not follow them.

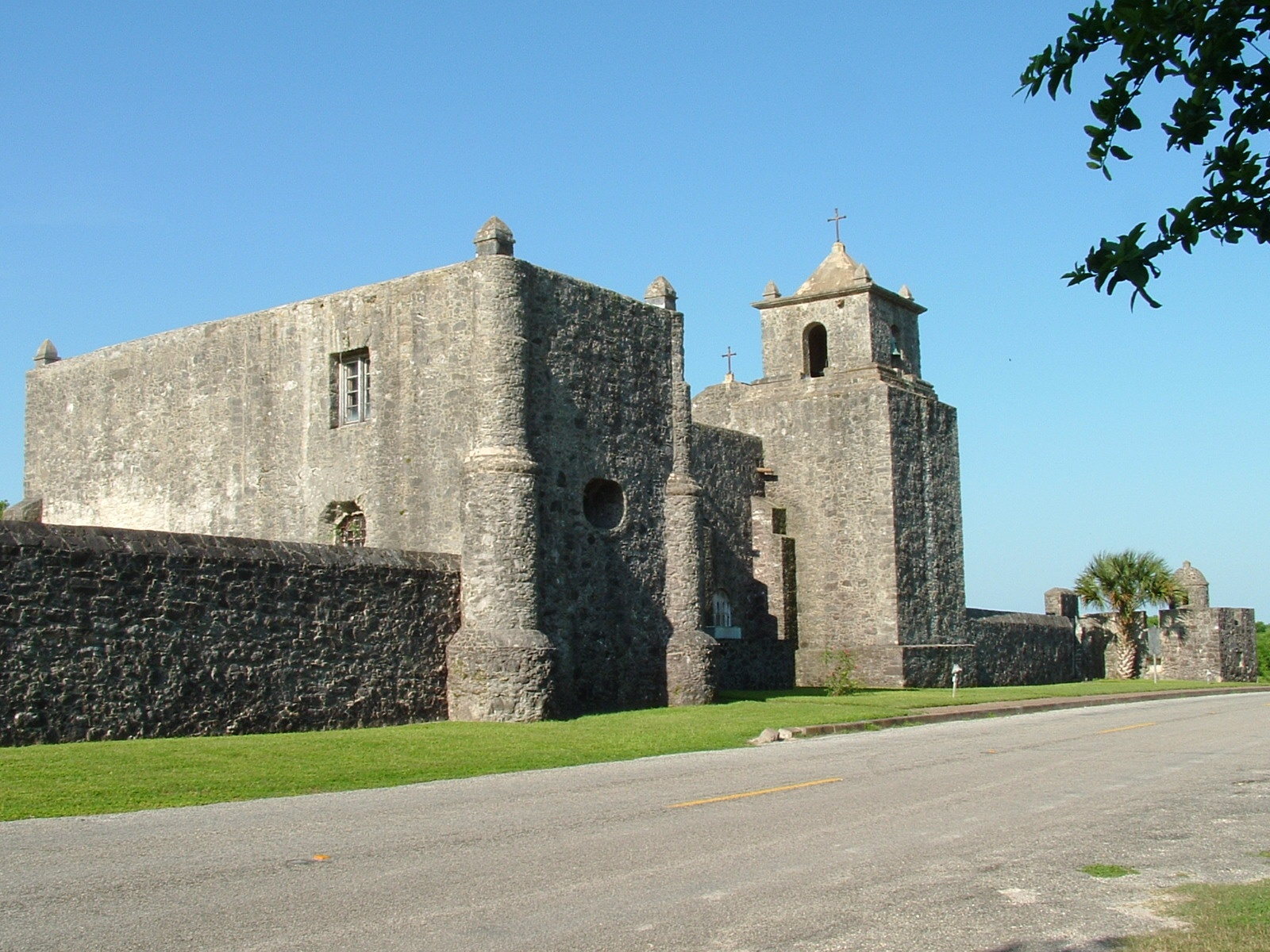
A modern-day photograph of Presidio La Bahía.

In an effort to catch Fannin's troops Urrea left his artillery, and some of his men, in Goliad. He began his pursuit with, according to Mexican sources, 80 cavalrymen and 360 infantrymen. Mexican mounted scouts determined the location of the Texians, and reported the size of the force, which Urrea concluded was smaller than he originally thought. As a result, he ordered 100 of his soldiers to go back to Goliad to help secure Presidio La Bahía. He also ordered the artillery he left in Goliad to be brought to him, and that the artillery would be escorted by some of the soldiers he was sending back. Meanwhile, Albert C. Horton's 30 cavalrymen were serving as advance guards, and were positioned to cover all sides of the Texian force. The rear guard was not alert, and did not detect the Mexican cavalry that was approaching the Texians. Shortly after they resumed their march another Texian cart broke down, and its cargo had to be transferred to another one, delaying the retreat again. Shortly after, Fannin had sent Horton to scout the Coleto Creek timber that was in sight, then the Mexican cavalry overtook Fannin's Texians. As the Texians tried to get to high ground 400 to 500 yards away from the position they were in when the cavalry overtook them, the ammunition cart broke.

== Battle ==
The Texian soldiers formed a square against the Mexicans. The high grass of the prairie meant the Texian view of the Mexicans was impaired. The Texians had little water. Each Texian soldier received three to four muskets. The square was three ranks deep. The front line contained the San Antonio Greys and Red Rovers, whilst Duval's Mustangs and Frazer's Refugio militia formed part of the rear line. The left flank was covered by Westover's regulars, whilst the right was protected by the Mobile Greys. In the corners of the square, the artillery had been positioned. Fannin stood in the rear of the right flank. In addition, a number of sharpshooters were deployed around Abel Morgan's hospital wagon, which could no longer be moved after the ox that was moving it was killed by Mexican fire.

The Mexican soldiers then attacked the square. The left of the Texian square was confronted by the rifle companies under Morales, and the right was assaulted by the grenadiers and part of the San Luis Battalion. The Mexican formations involved in this attack on the right of the square was under the personal supervision of Urrea. The Jiménez Battalion under Col. Mariano Salas fought the front, and Col. Gabriel Núñez's cavalry was ordered against the rear of the square. By sunset, when Urrea ordered the Mexicans to cease any more major attacks against the square due to a lack of Mexican ammunition, the majority of the action of 19 March was over. The Mexicans had assaulted the square three times. Making effective use of their bayonets, multiple muskets, and nine cannons, the Texians had prevented the Mexicans each time from breaking the square. Urrea said that he was impressed with the fact that the Texians had managed to maintain the square against the three charges, and he was also impressed with the Texian weapon fire. Dr. Joseph H. Barnard, a Texian, recorded that by sunset seven Texians had been killed. He also recorded that sixty Texians, including Fannin, had been wounded. Forty of the sixty had been wounded several times.

After sunset, Urrea ordered Mexican sharpshooters to be positioned in the tall grass around the square, and that they fire at the Texians. Before Texian sharpshooters were able to remove the threat posed by the Mexican sharpshooters, by firing at the flash caused by the Mexican guns, the Mexican sharpshooters were able to inflict more Texian casualties. As a result of all the fighting that occurred on 19 March, the Texians had suffered at least ten dead and sixty wounded, whilst the Mexicans suffered an unspecified high number of casualties. The fighting of 19 March had not demoralized the Texian soldiers. They were encouraged by the thought that Horton would succeed in getting Texian reinforcements from Guadalupe Victoria to Fannin. However, Horton had not been able to break through the Mexican defenses. During the day's fighting the Texian soldiers that were retreating to Guadalupe Victoria after the earlier battle of Refugio were close enough to Fannin to hear gunfire. However, they were exhausted and hungry and did not move to the square. Urrea stationed three detachments of Mexican troops around the square, to prevent the Texians in the square from escaping, and during the night Mexican false bugle calls were sounded to keep the Texians alert.

The Texans' lack of water, and the inability to light fires in the square, meant the wounded Texians could not be treated. The pain being experienced by the wounded resulted in the general decrease in morale amongst the Texian soldiers during the night. The poor weather during the night further lessened the morale of the soldiers. The lack of water also meant that the artillery could not be used effectively the next day, because the water was needed to cool and clean the cannons. The fighting of 19 March had also left many Texian artillerists casualties, and ammunition for the cannons was low. All these factors contributed to the conclusion by Fannin and other officers during the night that they could not sustain another day of fighting. An idea for the Texians to escape to a more defend-able position under cover of darkness, before Urrea received reinforcements, was rejected because it was decided that those who were too injured to escape, which included friends and relatives of unwounded Texians, should not be left behind. It was therefore decided that the Texians should attempt to make another stand from their current position the next day. As a result, during the night, the Texians dug trenches and erected barricades of carts and dead animals. Urrea, meanwhile, had been reinforced with munitions, fresh troops, and two or three artillery pieces from Goliad. He positioned the Mexican artillery on the slopes overlooking the Texian square.

At 06:15 on March 20, the Mexicans were grouped for battle. After one or two rounds were fired by Mexican artillery Fannin and his officers re-iterated their conclusion that the Texians could not take another day's fighting, and decided to seek honorable terms for surrender. They drafted terms of surrender, which included statements that the Texian wounded would be treated, that they would gain all the protection expected as prisoners of war, and that they would be paroled to the United States of America. However, Santa Anna had stated earlier that any Texian can only be allowed to surrender unconditionally. As a result, Urrea could not guarantee that all the terms would be followed by Santa Anna. He stated that he would talk to Santa Anna on behalf of the terms of surrender presented by the Texians. The document of surrender was signed by Benjamin C. Wallace, Joseph M. Chadwick, and Fannin. As a result of the signing, the battle of Coleto ended.

== Aftermath ==
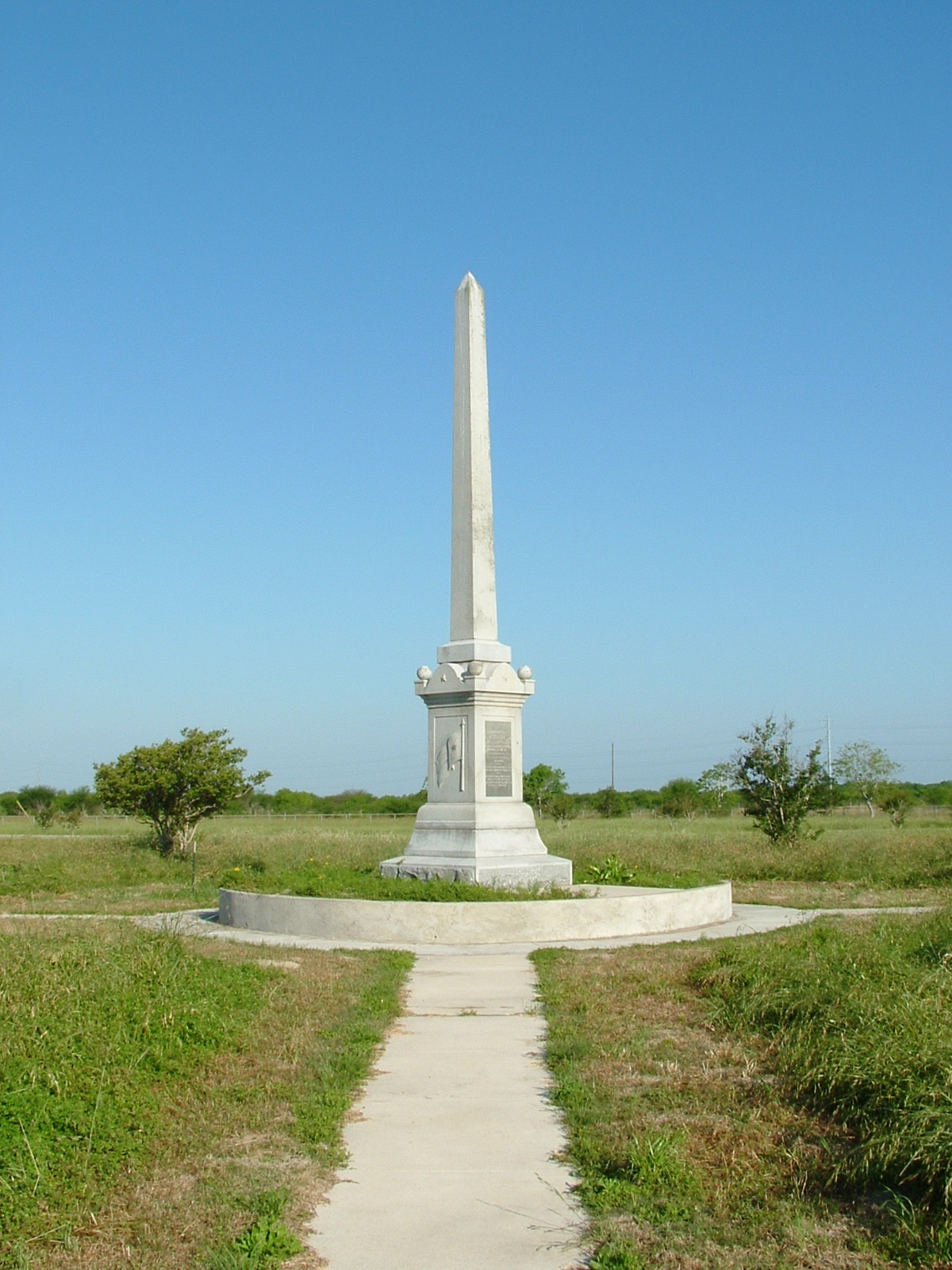
An obelisk commemorating the war at Fannin Battleground State Historic Site.

Those Texians that could walk were sent to Goliad, under Mexican escort. It would take until about March 23 until those Texians that could not walk were transported to Goliad. During that time, Mexican physicians were told that wounded Mexicans were a priority to treat, as opposed to the wounded Texians. Fannin arrived in Goliad on March 22. Urrea, meanwhile, had moved onto Guadalupe Victoria, from where he wrote to Santa Anna a letter recommending that the Texian prisoners should be treated with clemency. However, Santa Anna did not follow Urrea's recommendation, instead ordering the Mexican commander at Goliad, Jose Nicolas de la Portilla, to execute the Texian prisoners. On Palm Sunday, March 27, 1836, Fannin and about 425 to 445 other Texian prisoners were shot by Mexican soldiers. The execution became known as the Goliad Massacre.

The Battle of Coleto was significant because it showed that Texian troops involved in the battle, despite being relatively untrained, were able to stand up to the Mexican troops against them and obey their commanders. The battle was primarily lost because Fannin did not act decisively enough to ensure success and also underestimated the quality of the Mexican force against him. It also illustrated that Fannin was reluctant to coordinate his actions with other Texian forces, a trait that was common for many Texian commanders.

== See also ==
- List of Texas Revolution battles
- Timeline of the Texas Revolution
- Fannin Battleground State Historic Site
- Carlos de la Garza (Texas)
