= Juan José Holzinger =

Juan José Holzinger (?–1864) was a German-born mining engineer who served as a colonel in the Mexican Army during the Texas Revolution.

Holzinger first came to Mexico in 1825 as a mining engineer for a British company. He served with Santa Anna when he led a Federalist revolt. During the Texas Revolution Holzinger was credited with saving some Texan prisoners. Afterward he moved to Vera Cruz where he became a major landowner.
