= Frank W. Johnson =

Co-commander of the Texian Army

Francis White Johnson
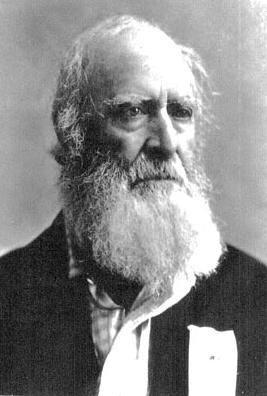
- Frank W. Johnson
- Born: October 3, 1799; Leesburg, Virginia, United States
- Died: April 8, 1884 (aged 84); Aguascalientes, Mexico
- Burial place: Texas State Cemetery
- Military career
- Allegiance: Republic of Texas
- Branch: Texian Army; Army of the Republic of Texas
- Service years: 1835-36
- Rank: Co-commander
- Nickname: Frank
- Conflicts: Battle of Anahuac; Siege of Bexar; Battle of Goliad; Battle of San Patricio
- Other work: Constable; Delegate; Surveyor; Author

Francis White Johnson (October 3, 1799 – April 8, 1884) was a leader of the Texian Army from December 1835 through February 1836, during the Texas Revolution. Johnson arrived in Texas in 1826 and worked as a surveyor for several empresarios, including Stephen F. Austin. One of his first activities was to plot the new town of Harrisburg. Johnson unsuccessfully tried to prevent the Fredonian Rebellion and served as a delegate to the Convention of 1832.

During the early part of the Texas Revolution, Johnson served as the adjutant and inspector general of the Texian Army. During the final assault of the siege of Bexar, Johnson led one of the two divisions which fought Mexican troops and was a member of the committee that negotiated the Mexican surrender. Following the battle, Johnson became commander of the volunteers. In late December 1835, the Texas provisional government named him co-commander of an expedition to invade Mexico. By late January, the provisional government had named several others as heads of the Texian Army, and there was confusion in the army and the general public over who was in charge.

Johnson and his men were surprised at the Battle of San Patricio on February 27, 1836. Most of his men were killed, but Johnson escaped. During the next three decades, Johnson alternately lived in Texas or traveled the United States. He settled permanently near Austin, Texas, in 1871 and spent the rest of his life researching Texas history. In 1914, thirty years after Johnson's death, historian Eugene C. Barker edited Johnson's manuscripts into a book, A History of Texas and Texans.

== Early years ==
Francis White Johnson was born October 3, 1799, near Leesburg, Virginia. In 1812, he moved with his parents Henson and Jane Johnson to Tennessee. Although Johnson was trained as a surveyor, he turned down a job that would have sent him to what is now Alabama. Instead, he lived in various places in Illinois and Missouri, supporting himself by teaching, serving as constable, or working in a lead mine. He also briefly ran a grocery store and then a lumber mill.

== Establishment in Texas ==
Johnson contracted malaria in 1826. A doctor advised him to find a more healthful environment, so he and his cousin, Wiley B. White, immigrated to Texas, then a part of Mexico. There, Johnson put his surveying education to use. In 1826 he plotted the new town of Harrisburg. He quickly earned the trust of empresario Stephen F. Austin. When another empresario, Haden Edwards, showed signs of revolting against the Mexican government, Austin asked Johnson and two other men to try to prevent a disturbance. They were unsuccessful, and Edwards soon launched the Fredonian Rebellion, which was quickly put down.

By 1832, Johnson had become the surveyor-general of Austin's colony, and briefly served as alcade. In late May, Johnson became one of the instigators of the first of the Anahuac Disturbances. He joined a group of citizens protesting military commander Juan Davis Bradburn's arrest of William Barret Travis and Patrick Jack. The settlers were outraged that the arrests did not require a warrant, a statement of charges, or trial by jury. Most were unfamiliar with Mexican law and assumed that the United States Bill of Rights still applied to them. The civilians congregated several miles from the military post at Anahuac and elected Johnson as their commander. The group soon captured Bradburn's 19 cavalry officers, who had been trying to reconnoiter the Texian position. On June 10, Johnson led the men into Anahuac, where they occupied several buildings. After negotiation with Mexican officers, Johnson agreed to release his prisoners and withdraw from the town; Travis and Jack would then be freed. Although most of the rebels left Anahuac, between 15 and 30 of them remained scattered through the town. Bradburn believed this violated their agreement and threatened to fire on the town. The Texians gathered at Turtle Bayou. While they waited for cannon to arrive from Brazoria, the men drafted the Turtle Bayou Resolutions. In this document, they declared themselves federalists who supported rebellious Mexican general Antonio Lopez de Santa Anna. They also decried "the present dynasty" which gave them military order instead of civil authority.

Bradburn had dispatched a messenger to Nacogdoches, requesting the assistance of Colonel Piedras. When Piedras was within 30 miles (48 km) of Anahuac, he sent a delegation to Johnson. Johnson provided him with a list of grievances against Bradburn. Piedras agreed to force Bradburn to resign, and to have the civilian prisoners released to civilian authorities.

Shortly after the conflict was resolved, Johnson was elected to the Convention of 1832 as a delegate from San Felipe de Austin, and became the chairman of the Central Standing Committee. In 1835, Johnson, along with Samuel May Williams and Dr. Robert Peebles, were named empresarios for a land grant in Texas. Settlers could claim land if they agreed to serve one year of military service. Johnson did not insist that the settlers actually fulfill their promise, and the land grants were voided in 1837.

== Texas Revolution ==
As relations soured between Texas colonists and the Mexican government, Johnson began to advocate for war. In the summer of 1835, Mexican general Martin Perfecto de Cos issued warrants for the arrest of Johnson and five other men, all accused of land speculation or attacking Anahuac. (Note: The other men were Robert M. Williamson, William Barret Travis, Samuel May Williams, Mosely Baker, and Lorenzo de Zavala.) Local officials refused to enforce the warrants, and the men were never arrested. All of the men were well respected in their communities, and the warrants greatly angered other colonists. This, combined with news that Cos was leading a large military force to Texas, convinced many colonists to embrace the idea of revolt.

=== Siege of Bexar ===
When the Texas Revolution began in October 1835, Johnson was named the adjutant and inspector general of the volunteer forces, which were led by Austin. Johnson accompanied the army to San Antonio de Bexar, where they initiated a siege. On November 6, Austin reorganized the army, forming a new regiment. Although Johnson ran in the election for commander, he received only 10 votes, putting him fourth. Edward Burleson won, becoming the regiment commander. Two weeks later, Austin resigned as commander of the Texian Army and called an election to appoint the new commander. Burleson won handily.

As the siege progressed, many of the Texians left the army to return to their homes. On December 4, Burleson called a meeting of the troops and suggested that they withdraw to Goliad for the remainder of the winter. As the troops discussed the possibility, a Mexican cavalry officer arrived in their camp and asked to surrender. He explained that Mexican morale inside Bexar was very low. This news boosted the spirits of the Texians, and Ben Milam challenged the men to join him in an assault on the town.

Milam formed the men into two divisions, which would simultaneously attack the empty houses on the outskirts of Bexar. Milam led one division, and Johnson, now a colonel, was appointed commander of the second. Johnson's division numbered 177 men divided into 7 companies. They were guided by Deaf Smith and John W. Smith.

Early on the morning of December 5, Colonel James C. Neill created a distraction by ordering the artillery to fire on the walls of the Alamo Mission. As the artillery boomed, the two attack columns sneaked towards Bexar. Johnson led his men along the San Antonio River, and they quickly charged the Veramendi house. Milam's men took the de la Garza house across the street. Mexican soldiers opened fire, forcing Johnson and his men to take cover behind buildings. Milam's men provided covering fire, allowing Johnson and his men to safely enter the Veramendi house. For the rest of the day, Johnson and his men worked to fortify the Veramendi home, digging trenches and creating earthworks around the yard.

For the next several days, fighting house to house, the Texians gradually closed in on the fortified Mexican positions in Bexar's main plazas. On the afternoon of December 7, Milam came to the Veramendi house to consult with Johnson. As they spoke, a Mexican sharpshooter killed Milam; the sharpshooter was quickly killed by Texian fire. Johnson oversaw Milam's burial in one of the newly dug trenches.

With Milam's death, Johnson assumed command of the battle. He assigned Robert C. Morris to oversee Milam's column of men. The Texians continued to fight their way from house to house, slowly driving back the Mexican troops. The Texian advance had further demoralized the Mexican troops, and a Mexican cavalry company deserted on December 9. Shortly after that, Mexican General Martin Perfecto de Cos sent one of his officers to negotiate a surrender. Johnson served on the negotiating team. The siege of Bexar officially ended when the two sides adopted the surrender agreement on December 11. The Mexican soldiers were set free on the condition that they return to Mexico within six days and not take up arms against the Texians again.

=== Army command ===
With Cos's departure, there was no longer an organized garrison of Mexican troops in Texas, and many of the Texians believed that the war was over. Johnson described the battle as "the period put to our present war". Burleson resigned his leadership of the army on December 15 and returned to his home. Many of the men did likewise, and Johnson assumed command of the soldiers who remained. During this time, the provisional government had created a new regular branch of the Texian Army and placed Sam Houston in charge. Houston was given no authority over the volunteers, however, leaving Johnson as their commander.

In the relative quiet after the Mexican garrison left, Dr. James Grant began advocating an attack on Matamoros. Many of the remaining Texian soldiers approved of the mission and clamored for it to begin. On December 25, Grant traveled to Washington on the Brazos to convince the provisional government to support the plan. The Governing Council agreed, but secretly named Johnson and James Fannin co-commanders of the expedition. On January 3, Johnson and Grant left Bexar, taking with them 300 of the 400 men who had been stationed there. This incensed Colonel James C. Neill, who remained at the Alamo to lead the remaining men. On January 6, 1836, Neill wrote to the governing council:

"If there has ever been a dollar here I have no knowledge of it. The clothing sent here by the aid and patriotic exertions of the honorable Council, was taken from us by arbitrary measures of Johnson and Grant, taken from men who endured all the hardships of winter and who were not even sufficiently clad for summer, many of them having but one blanket and one shirt, and what was intended for them given away to men some of whom had not been in the army more than four days, and many not exceeding two weeks."

The Texan provisional governor, Henry Smith, strongly opposed the Matamoros expedition and loudly proclaimed that anyone who supported it was a traitor or an idiot. Smith then dissolved the governing council, which responded by impeaching him. The temporary Texas constitution had given neither Smith nor the council the right to depose the other, and both groups continued to insist that they were the rightful rulers.

On January 10, Johnson issued a call to form a Federal Volunteer Army of Texas which would march on Matamoros. On January 14, Houston arrived in Goliad to take command of the army that Johnson and Grant had gathered. On his arrival he discovered that Grant and Johnson were calling themselves commanders of the army. Houston accompanied the army as it marched to Refugio. Once there, he gave a speech and pointedly asked how this small group of men planned to take a city of 12,000 people. Later that day, Houston received official word that he had been fired and that the council had now placed James Fannin in charge of the army. Houston left in disgust and traveled to East Texas to negotiate a peace treaty with the Cherokee. For the next several months it was unclear who was in charge of the Texian army—Fannin, Johnson, Grant, or Houston.

After Houston's speech, many of the Texian volunteers began to rethink their commitment to the Matamoros Expedition. Many left the army. Others decided to follow the "new" leader of the Texian Army and joined Fannin at Presidio La Bahia in Goliad. Only 70 men remained with Johnson and Grant.

=== Battle of San Patricio ===
Johnson and Grant settled in San Patricio, where they continued to make plans to invade Mexico. In mid-February, Grant took about two dozen men south to catch wild horses. While Grant was gone, Mexican General Jose de Urrea led a surprise attack on San Patricio in the early hours of the morning of February 27. Most of Johnson's men were killed, but Johnson escaped. Grant was also later surprised by Urrea's army, while they camped at Agua Dulce Creek.

When Johnson received word that Houston was retreating towards East Texas, Johnson became disgusted with the revolution and up and quit. He returned to his home for the remainder of the conflict.

== Later years ==
The war ended in April, after Texians defeated General Antonio Lopez de Santa Anna at the battle of San Jacinto. For the next three years, Johnson operated a plantation at Johnson's Bluff, along the Trinity River in what is now San Jacinto County. In 1839, facing bankruptcy, Johnson abandoned his family and fled Texas. For the next several years, he wandered the United States, digging for buried treasure or precious metals and trying to sell lands in Texas. His wife, Rozelia, divorced him in 1842. In 1847, he returned to Texas and wooed his former wife again. Her new husband granted her a divorce and Rozelia moved in with Johnson again. They lived together until she died in 1850.

In 1853, Johnson moved to Ellis County. He left Texas in 1860 and spent most of the American Civil War living in Indianapolis, Indiana. He returned to Texas in 1871, living in Austin and Round Rock. For the remainder of his life, Johnson lived as a virtual recluse and spent most of his time researching Texas history. In 1873 he helped found the Texas Veterans Association, and he served as its president until his death.

Johnson died of cancer in Aguascalientes, Mexico, about April 8, 1884. The Texas Veterans Association lobbied for funding to have his remains moved to Texas, and Johnson was eventually reburied in the Texas State Cemetery.

In 1912, historian Eugene C. Barker collected Johnson's manuscripts and edited them into a book, A History of Texas and Texans. The book was published in 1914 and republished in 1916.

== See also ==
- List of Convention of 1832 delegates
