= James Grant (Texas politician) =

- Born: July 28, 1793; Ross-shire, Scotland
- Died: March 2, 1836 (aged 42); Agua Dulce, Nueces County, Texas
- Military career
- Allegiance: Republic of Texas
- Branch: (Republic of Texas) Texian Army
- Service years: 1835-36
- Rank: Private; Co-commander
- Conflicts: Texas Revolution: Siege of Béxar; Battle of Agua Dulce †

James Grant (1793–1836) was a 19th-century Texas politician, physician and military participant in the Texas Revolution.

== Early life ==
James Grant was born on July 28, 1793, in Ross-shire, Scotland, son of William Grant. His paternal grandfather, Alexander Grant, was a veteran of the Battle of Culloden of 1746 who later became a director of the East India Company and was the last man to escape from the Black Hole of Calcutta.

Grant attended medical school, and in 1812 he joined the East India Company. Despite his young age, with the influence of his cousin Charles Grant, 1st Baron Glenelg, he was named the surgeon for the General Stuart. Just before leaving on his maiden voyage, Grant married Margaret Urquhart, the daughter of an East India Company official.

Over the next seven years, Grant made three voyages with the East India Company to India and to China. In a brief visit home, he fathered a son, Stewart Majoribanks, who was born in 1817. His daughter Jamesina was born five years later. On his voyages, Grant, like most of his comrades, did a little trading of his own, resulting in a respectable fortune.

In 1823, he traveled to northern Mexico, ending up in Texas. He became interested in real estate and purchased an estate in Parras, Coahuila, Mexico in 1825. In Coahuila, he was soon involved in politics, where he became secretary of the Executive Council. In 1832, he was a member of the legislature of Coahuila and Texas.

In 1832 and 1833, he tried his hand in colonizing a settlement near Goliad. In 1833, Grant moved to Nacogdoches, Texas. From March through April 1835, Grant was secretary of the legislature of Coahuila and Texas at Monclova, Mexico. In Coahuila, he acquired vast landholdings and was friends to the Federalist Mexicans and enemies to the Centralists. In 1834 and 1835 he was "Jefe de Armas" or Commander of the local military police. In the spring of 1836, Grant and the Mexican legislators were forced to flee Coahuila when President Santa Anna sent General Martín Perfecto de Cos with a regiment of the Mexican army to disperse the congress.

== Texas Revolution ==
He was soon a member of the Texian Army, serving from December 1835 through March 1836, during the Texas Revolution and fighting in the Siege of Béxar. In San Antonio, he would help plan the assault on Bexar and negotiate the surrender of Cos. He served as a Goliad delegate to the Consultation.

In early December, Grant was advocating for an expedition to invade Matamoros, suggesting Houston was not the person to be in charge of the Texian Army. By January 10, 1836, Grant and Frank W. Johnson, who were old partners in Monclova land deals, were seeking volunteers to join a Federal Volunteer Army of Texas to march on Matamoros.

On January 14, Sam Houston arrived in Goliad to take command of the army that Grant and Johnson had recruited. He soon discovered that Grant and Johnson had established themselves as commanders of the army. Houston went along with the Texian army, instilling camaraderie as they reached Refugio, Texas. In Refugio he approached the soldiers, telling them how a small army could not conquer a city of 12,000 and thereby convinced over half of the men to quit. That same day, Houston would receive word that he had been removed by the council as commander of the army and had been replaced by James Fannin. Houston left the army and traveled to negotiate with the Cherokees in the eastern region of Texas. For several months it was unclear if Grant, Fannin, Johnson, or Houston was in charge of the Texian army.

In the early spring of 1836, Grant and Frank W. Johnson continued their quest towards Matamoros. As co-commanders of the Matamoros Expedition with about 70 to 100 men, they went as far as San Patricio to gather horses for their expedition. Grant was informed that Mexican Captain Nicolás Rodríguez and a small company formerly from Fort Lipantitlán was in the area. Grant confronted and overtook them, confiscated their horses and took the men as prisoners to San Patricio. Within a few days the prisoners had escaped, alerting Mexican forces. Splitting into smaller groups, the Texians searched for mounts and supplies, proceeding all the way to Santa Rosa Ranch. Grant and a group of fifteen Texians while foraging, were attacked by members of General José de Urrea's cavalry. Grant was killed in the battle of Agua Dulce at 10:30 a.m. on March 2, 1836.

== Allegedly British agent? ==
The historical record supports the conclusion that James Grant acted as an intelligence agent in Texas, with British diplomat Henry Ward involved in efforts to limit American expansion during the mid-1820s, before later becoming a Texian revolutionary as a pro-Federalist.

He is survived by his sister, Sarah "Sally" Grant Urquhart, and the item remains in the possession of her descendant, Alice Layton Falchetto.

== Sources ==
- Barr, Alwyn (1990). Texans in Revolt: the Battle for San Antonio, 1835. Austin, TX: University of Texas Press. ISBN 0-292-77042-1.
- Hardin, Stephen L. (1994). Texian Iliad – A Military History of the Texas Revolution. Austin, TX: University of Texas Press. ISBN 0-292-73086-1.
- Henson, Margaret Swett (1982). Juan Davis Bradburn: A Reappraisal of the Mexican Commander of Anahuac. College Station, TX: Texas A&M University Press. ISBN 978-0-89096-135-3.
- Reid, Stuart (2007). The Secret War for Texas. Elma Dill Russell Spencer Series in the West and Southwest. College Station, Texas: Texas A&M University Press. ISBN 978-1-58544-565-3.
- Santos, Richard G. (1968). Santa Anna's campaign against Texas, 1835-1836;: Featuring the field commands issued to Major General Vicente Filisola (First ed.). Texian Press. ASIN B0006BV0Y8.
- Todish, Timothy J.; Todish, Terry; Spring, Ted (1998). Alamo Sourcebook, 1836: A Comprehensive Guide to the Battle of the Alamo and the Texas Revolution. Austin, TX: Eakin Press. ISBN 978-1-57168-152-2.
