= Stephen L. Hardin =

American historian and author (born 1953)

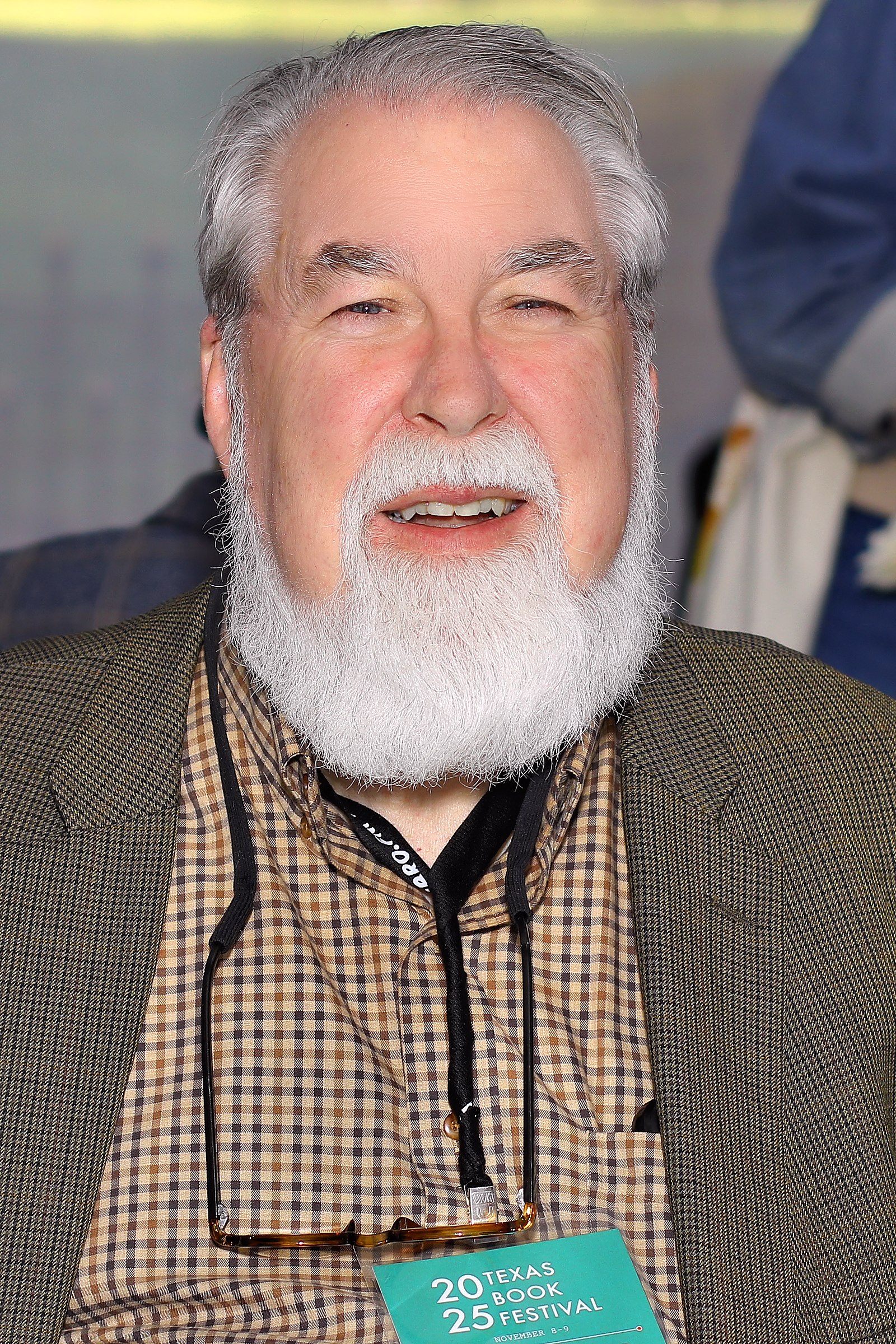
- Hardin at the 2025 Texas Book Festival
- Born: January 3, 1953
- Education: Southwest Texas State University (BA, MA); Texas Christian University (PhD)
- Occupations: Historian; professor; author
- Writing career
- Subject: History of Texas

Stephen L. Hardin is an American historian and author who is an expert on the history of Texas.

== Education ==
Hardin attended Southwest Texas State University, in San Marcos, Texas, where he received both a BA and MA in History. He would later attend Texas Christian University, in Fort Worth, Texas, where he would receive his PhD specializing in Texas history.

Currently, Dr. Hardin teaches at McMurry University in Abilene, Texas. Some have falsely claimed that Dr. Hardin asserts his nationality as Texan, on the grounds that Texas was once an independent nation. Dr. Hardin emphatically refuted that claim on "The Sons of History" podcast on July 11, 2020 (released on July 13, 2020).

== Alamo Historian and Expert ==
Hardin is considered a leading expert in the world in Texas military and social history. He is widely cited with regards to the Battle of the Alamo. Hardin has also appeared on the History Channel in "The Alamo Documentary: A True Story of Courage" He was also a historic advisor to John Lee Hancock's 2004 movie, The Alamo, starring Billy Bob Thornton.

== Publications ==
- Stephin L. Hardin (author) and Gary S. Zaboly (illustrator), Texian Iliad: A Military History of the Texas Revolution, 1835-1836, University of Texas Press, (1994)
- Stephen Hardin (author) and Angus McBride (illustrator), The Alamo 1836: Santa Anna's Texas Campaign, Osprey Publishing (2001).
- Stephen L. Hardin (author) and Gary S. Zaboly (illustrator), Texian Macabre: A Melancholy Tale of a Hanging in Early Houston, State House Press, (2007)
- Stephen L. Hardin (author), Texian Exodus: The Runaway Scrape and Its Enduring Legacy, University of Texas Press, (2025)
