= José de Urrea =

Mexican general (1797–1849)

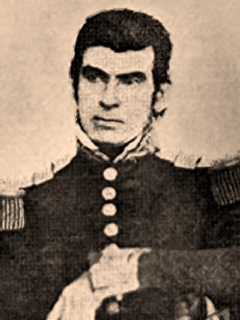

Governor of Sonora
- In office 29 December 1844 – 10 April 1845
- Preceded by: Francisco Ponce de León
- Succeeded by: Francisco Andrade Félix
- In office February 1843 – 21 May 1844
- Preceded by: José María Elías González
- Succeeded by: Francisco Ponce de León
- In office 1 June 1842 – January 1843
- Preceded by: Pedro Bautista Aguayo
- Succeeded by: José María Elías González

Governor of Durango
- In office September 1835 – November 1835
- Preceded by: Juan Manuel Asúnsolo
- Succeeded by: José Rafael Peña

Personal details
- Born: March 19, 1797 Presidio San Agustín del Tucsón, New Navarre, Viceroyalty of New Spain (now Tucson, Arizona, U.S.)
- Died: August 1, 1849 (aged 52) Durango, Mexico

Military service
- Allegiance: Spain; Army of the Three Guarantees; Mexico
- Branch/service: Spanish Army; Mexican Army
- Years of service: 1807–1821 (Spain); 1821–1848 (Mexico)
- Rank: Captain (Spain); General (Mexico)
- Battles/wars: Mexican War of Independence; Casa Mata Plan Revolution; Spanish attempts to reconquer Mexico; Capitulation of San Juan de Ulúa; Battle of Tampico; Zacatecas Rebellion; Battle of Zacatecas; Texas Revolution; Battle of San Patricio; Battle of Agua Dulce; Battle of Refugio; Battle of Coleto; Mexican Federalist Wars; Rebellion in northwestern Mexico; Battle of Acajete; Siege of the National Palace; Mexican–American War

José Cosme de Urrea y Elías González (full name) or simply José de Urrea (March 19, 1797 – August 1, 1849) was a Mexican general. He fought under General Antonio López de Santa Anna during the Texas Revolution. Urrea's forces were never defeated in battle during the Texas Revolution. His most notable success was that of the Goliad Campaign, in which James Fannin's 400 soldiers were surrounded and induced to capitulate under terms, but were massacred in Urrea's absence on the orders of Santa Anna. Urrea also fought in the Mexican–American War.

== Early life ==
Urrea was born at the Presidio Real de San Augustín de Tucsón (now the U.S. city of Tucson, Arizona), during Spanish regime of the region. Despite being born on the northern frontier of Mexico, his family had deep roots in the state of Durango.

== Military career ==
In 1807 Urrea entered the Spanish army. He was a military cadet in the presidial company of San Rafael Buenavista in 1809 and a lieutenant in 1816, participating in battles in Jalisco and Michoacán. In 1821 he supported the Plan of Iguala of Agustín de Iturbide. He participated in the anti-Iturbide Plan of Casa Mata and the siege of San Juan de Uluá. In 1824 he rose to the rank of captain, but he resigned from the army and entered private life. In 1829 he rejoined the military as a major and helped to liberate the city of Durango, allying himself with Antonio López de Santa Anna. He was promoted to colonel for his actions. In 1835 he reluctantly took part in Santa Anna's attack on the state of Zacatecas (the state had openly rebelled against his rise to power). Santa Anna promoted Urrea to Brigadier General for his role in this.

== Texas Revolution ==
When the Mexican state of Texas also revolted against Santa Anna's Centralist government, Urrea was sent there to help put down the colonists. He easily defeated small groups of Texan forces at the Battle of San Patricio, Battle of Refugio, and Battle of Coleto. The last, also known as the "Goliad Massacre", included the deliberate slaughter of Texans who had surrendered. The execution of prisoners, however, was not Urrea's choice, but an order by General Santa Anna.

Due to Urrea's string of victories, Santa Anna decided to stay in Texas and personally finish off the rebellious Texas government. His motives were personal and political as Urrea was getting all the headlines and would be seen back in Mexico as a more popular figure.

== Aftermath ==
The military defeat of Santa Anna's forces at the Battle of San Jacinto on April 21, 1836, resulted in Santa Anna's capture, and him being forced to order all Mexican forces to withdraw from Texas soil. Urrea was infuriated and, after linking up with Vicente Filísola's forces, he wanted to continue the war against the Texans since the Mexicans still had over 2,500 troops in Texas against less than 900 of Sam Houston's Texans. But both Urrea and Filísola had no choice but to comply with Santa Anna's orders, so by the middle of June, Urrea and all Mexican forces had withdrawn from Texas. The Mexican authorities criticized Filísola for leading the retreat, stripped him of his command, and made Urrea the new commander of the army. Within a few months, Urrea gathered an army of 6,000 troops near Matamoros to finally reconquer Texas. However, the invasion never occurred as he and his troops were redirected to address several federalist rebellions across Mexico.

In 1837, Urrea turned against Santa Anna upon his return to Mexico, and fought against him at the Battle of Mazatlán in 1838. The attempted uprising resulted in his eventual arrest, and he was sent to Perote Prison. He later revived his military career with the invasion of French forces into Mexico, and another failed coup attempt followed.

The Mexican–American War saw Urrea leading a cavalry division against invading American troops. Urrea died August 1, 1849, of cholera shortly after the war ended.

== See also ==
- Timeline of the Texas Revolution
