= Herman Ehrenberg =

Texas revolutionary soldier from Germany

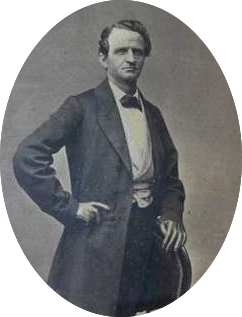
- Herman in the 1860s
- Born: c. 1816 possibly Steuden, Prussia (now Germany)
- Died: October 9, 1866; Dos Palmas, California, US
- Occupations: author, surveyor
- Known for: Catchphrase: "Texas forever!"
- Notable work: Texas und seine Revolution (1843), "Map of the Gadsden Purchase, Sonora, and portions of New Mexico, Chihuahua & California" (1854)

Herman Ehrenberg (October 17, 1816 – October 9, 1866) was a German surveyor who later served as a Texian soldier. He was one of the few survivors of the Goliad massacre. During his escape, he purportedly yelled, "The Republic of Texas forever!" which popularized the catchphrase "Texas forever!"

A native of Germany, Ehrenberg joined the military volunteer unit the New Orleans Greys and fought against Mexico in the Texas Revolution. His memoirs of the Revolution were published in Germany in the 1840s and translated into English in the 20th century.

Ehrenberg created the first map of the Gadsden Purchase. Ehrenberg, Arizona, is his namesake.

== Early life ==
Ehrenberg's early life is the subject of some discussion. According to historian James Crisp, "the majority of what has been published about him consisted of misinformation". A frequently repeated story is that Ehrenberg was the son of William von Ehrenberg, an official at the royal court of Frederick William III. (Note: According to Crisp, this version first appeared in an 1880 work by Gustav Körner detailing influential Germans in 19th-century America. It was repeated in the introduction to the 1935 English translation of Ehrenberg's memoir. Crisp, p. 429.) In this version, which is supported by historian H. W. Brands but which Crisp maintains has "not a shred of evidence to suggest that [it] is true", Ehrenberg later attended the Friedrich Schiller University of Jena, where he became involved in protests against the government.

An alternative theory, held by historians Carlos Castaneda, Clarence Wharton, and Natalie Ornish, is that Ehrenberg was Jewish. This is based primarily on hearsay from Barry Goldwater, whose grandfather was a close friend of Ehrenberg. (Note: According to Crisp, Barry Goldwater maintained correspondence with relatives of Ehrenberg. Those family members signed "Heil Hitler" in some of their letters, which pointed to a non-Jewish lineage. Crisp, p. 431.)

Crisp and Ornish agree that Hermann Vollrath Ehrenberg (Note: Ehrenberg's baptism record listed his name as "Hermann". In the 1830s, he began signing "Herman". His memoirs were published as "Hermann", but he did not change the spelling he used to sign documents. Crisp, p. 423) was born on October 17, 1816, in Steuden, Prussia. His birth and his baptism three days later, were recorded in a local Lutheran Church. (Note: Ornish maintains that in a small town like Steuden, the local priest may have recorded births of Jewish children. Crisp cites works by other historians that show that the Ehrenberg family was descended from Catholic bishops and Lutheran nobility. Crisp, p. 430.) Ehrenberg was one of three sons of Johann and Sophie Ehrenberg. His brothers were Emil and Friedrich (d. 1832).

Ehrenberg left Prussia in 1834 to move to the United States. He spent a year in New York City and then traveled to New Orleans.

== Texas Revolution ==
Herman Ehrenberg served with the New Orleans Greys during the Texas Revolution from 1835 to 1836

Ehrenberg arrived in New Orleans in October 1835. The city was abuzz with news of the newly declared Texas Revolution. All of the local papers and many of the residents supported the actions of the American settlers in Texas against the government of Mexico. On October 11, Adolphus Sterne organized a rally in support of the Texians. Ehrenberg attended the rally, which collected over $10,000 for the volunteer troops. The next day, he enlisted in the volunteer militia company that Sterne was organizing. The group became known as the New Orleans Greys for the color of the uniforms that they wore. Ehrenberg claimed to be the third person to volunteer for the Greys, and he was most likely the youngest member.

The Greys were divided into two companies. Ehrenberg was assigned to one led by Captain Thomas H. Breece. His group took a steamboat up the river to Natchitoches, Louisiana, where they prepared to enter Mexican Texas. The United States was officially neutral in the conflict, and President Andrew Jackson had publicly ordered that no armed men be allowed to cross the border. The Greys were cautious and crossed without incident.

=== Siege of Bexar ===
The Greys joined the Texian Army outside San Antonio de Bexar (now San Antonio, Texas). The Texians had laid siege to the city, trapping Mexican General Martin Perfecto de Cos and his troops. On December 5, the Texians attacked. Ehrenberg's company followed the San Antonio River into town and made their way to the central square. As they neared the square, Mexican soldiers opened fire. Ehrenberg and several others entered a stone guardhouse which soon bore the brunt of fire from Mexican artillery.

Unwilling to return to the streets, where there was no cover, Texians began fighting from house to house. Ehrenberg's small group exchanged fire with forces on the other side of the street. One of Ehrenberg's companions was seriously wounded by one before they realized neither group contained Mexican soldiers. Determined to join forces again, the men dug a trench to allow for safe passage from one house to the other. Fighting continued for three days as the Texians consolidated their positions and worked toward the town center. Cos surrendered on December 11 and led his troops back to the Mexican interior.

=== Matamoros Expedition ===
Ehrenberg was assigned to the Texian garrison at the Alamo Mission. He scouted the area around the mission, looking for provisions for the soldiers. No Mexican troops remained in Texas, and many garrison members became bored. James Grant and Frank W. Johnson were lobbying the provisional government to authorize an invasion of the Mexican interior. Many of the Greys, including Ehrenberg, left the Alamo on December 30 to join the Matamoros Expedition.

The expedition was soon the subject of much political turmoil. The governing council and the interim governor disagreed on who should lead the troops, and the governor soon dismissed the council, which impeached the governor. It was unclear who was in charge of the expedition - Grant, Johnson, or Colonel James W. Fannin. Sam Houston, who had originally been named head of the army, and who later received a furlough of duty to the council from Governor Smith, joined the troops in Goliad and Refugio. There he gave an impassioned speech encouraging the soldiers to remain to defend Texas from the Mexican army rumored to be returning to the province.

=== Battle of Coleto ===
Most of the troops, including Ehrenberg, heeded Houston's plea and returned to Goliad under Fannin, while Johnson and Grant took several dozen troops to continue preparing for a potential invasion. The Mexican Army of Operations crossed into Texas in February 1836. President Antonio Lopez de Santa Anna led one group of troops through the center of the province towards Bexar. General Jose de Urrea led a second group up the coast toward Goliad. Urrea's Goliad Campaign was victorious over Grant and Johnson's small groups of troops.

On March 19, Fannin ordered a retreat from Goliad. Ehrenberg was one of several scouts assigned to watch for signs of Urrea's army. When his group saw the column of soldiers headed their way, most of the scouts scattered. Ehrenberg was the only one to return to Fannin. They were confronted by Urrea's troops that evening, and the Battle of Coleto commenced. On March 20, Fannin began negotiations for surrender. This almost caused a mutiny, as the soldiers had heard rumors that Mexican troops had killed Texian troops who attempted to surrender after the Battle of the Alamo several weeks previously and were worried that they would meet the same fate.

None of the Mexican officers spoke English, and none of the Texians spoke Spanish. When it was discovered that Mexican Captain Juan Jose Holzinger spoke German, Ehrenberg was asked to conduct the parley on behalf of the Texians. Fannin conceded all arms, while Urrea agreed to expel the men from Texas, provided they all promised not to take up arms against the present government of Mexico. Ehrenberg later admitted this was an easy promise to make, as no one expected the same government to be in power the following year. As a German citizen, Ehrenberg was invited to join the Mexican Army with no consequences, but he declined.

=== Goliad Massacre ===
The Texians were imprisoned in the church at Goliad, where it was so crowded that they could not sit or lie down. Although Urrea left orders for the Mexican commander there to treat the prisoners well, these were countermanded by Santa Anna, who ordered the execution of all prisoners. A week later, the Texians were divided into groups and marched from the barracks. Ehrenberg was in a group marched towards the San Antonio River. Mexican soldiers opened fire at point-blank range. Ehrenberg was not wounded in the first volley. In the confusion, he fell to the ground and crawled toward the river. He suffered a small wound from a sword before jumping off the banks to the river 30 to 40 feet (9.1 to 12.2 m) below. According to Ehrenberg, after he reached the safety of the opposite bank, he "looked back at the place where my friends lay bleeding to death. The enemy was still shooting and yelling, and it was with a sorrowful heart that I listened to these shouts of triumph which in my fancy were mingled with the groans of pain of my dying friends." Ehrenberg was one of only a handful of men to survive the Goliad Massacre.

Ehrenberg wandered the countryside for the next few days. Most settlers had already fled, and Ehrenberg was unable to find food. With few options on how to proceed, Ehrenberg approached Urrea and claimed to be a Prussian traveler who needed protection. Urrea allowed Ehrenberg to travel with him for the next few weeks. After Texian troops defeated Santa Anna at the Battle of San Jacinto on April 21, Ehrenberg and another Texan slipped away from Urrea's men and made their way to Matagorda, which was in the hands of the Texans. He was discharged from the Texian Army on June 2, 1836.

== 1836–1854 ==
Ehrenberg returned to Germany and enrolled at Freiburg University to study mining. In the early 1840s he worked at University of Halle, teaching English. He wrote a memoir of his experiences in the Texas Revolution, published in 1843 as Texas und Seine Revolution. It was reprinted in 1844 as Der Freiheitskampf in Texas im Jahre 1836 and in 1845 as Fahrten und Schicksale eines Deutschen in Texas.

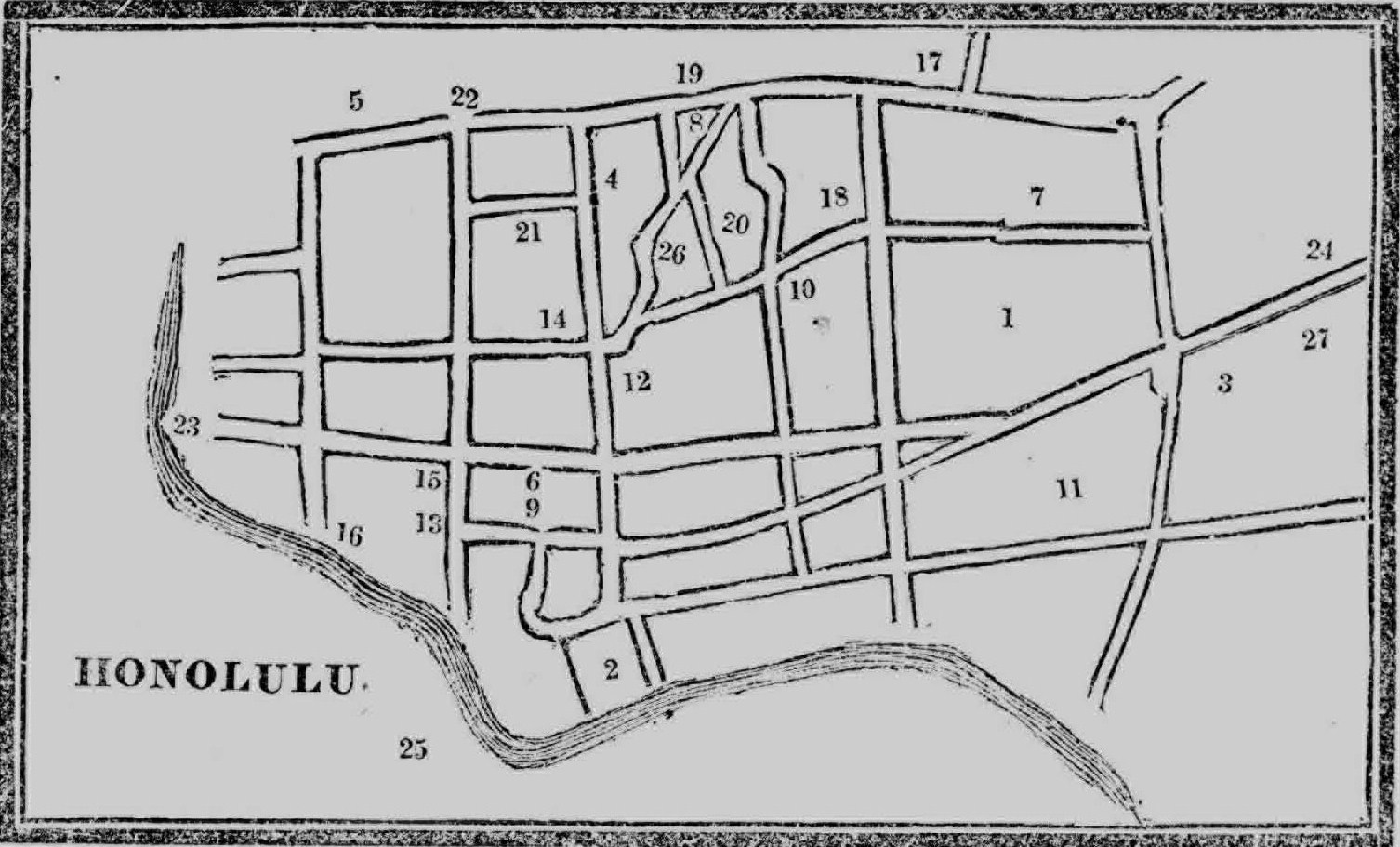
1845 Map of Honolulu drawn by Ehrenberg

He returned to the United States in 1844, and journeyed to St. Louis, Missouri, to join a group traveling to Oregon Territory. In May 1845, he sailed from Oregon to Hawaii on the brig Chenamus. Within several months, the Hawaiian government hired him to survey the streets of Honolulu.

For the next two years, Ehrenberg likely operated a schooner, Louise, which brought goods from La Paz in Baja California Territory to Hawaii. For at least part of that time, Ehrenberg lived in La Paz. Some historians, such as Ornish, maintain that in 1846 and 1847, Ehrenberg sailed to Tahiti and several other Polynesian islands.

Some historians report that in 1846 Ehrenberg joined the 1st Regiment of New York Volunteers in California to fight in the Mexican–American War. Most evidence disputes that Ehrenberg joined the army. According to the memoirs of one of the soldiers in that unit, Ehrenberg was a civilian and "volunteer aide" to Captain Seymour Steele of that regiment. In March 1848, Ehrenberg and 33 other men rescued American prisoners held south of La Paz.

== Arizona ==
In January 1854, California residents learned that the Gadsden Purchase had been completed. Charles Poston recruited prospectors, including Ehrenberg, to travel to the new area and see what mining opportunities existed in the region. The group intended to sail aboard the Zoraida to Guaymas, Mexico, then travel overland to Tucson. The Zoraida was shipwrecked just off the coast of Mexico, and Ehrenberg and his comrades were stranded on a small island with fresh water and wild cattle. The men constructed a raft and sailed to the mainland, where they continued on their journey. They were briefly imprisoned when Mexican authorities mistook them for filibusters following William Walker in trying to take Baja California.

The group reached Tubac, Arizona, and soon gathered gold, silver, and copper samples. Much of this was likely acquired from other miners. Ehrenberg and Poston took the samples overland to San Francisco to gain investors for a mining consortium. On the way, the men stopped near Fort Yuma, and Ehrenberg surveyed a townsite, which he called Colorado City. The site eventually became the town of Yuma; Ehrenberg saw no profit from it. In 1856 he partnered with Charles Poston to form the Sonoro Exploring and Mining Company.

From 1863 through 1866, Ehrenberg served as Indian Agent for the Mojave people at the Colorado River Indian Reservation.

In 1865, Ehrenberg was a member of the convention held in Tucson in August 1856, requesting that the United States Congress organize the territory of Arizona.

Ehrenberg contributed to Mining Magazine, the Journal of Geology, and Arizona Weekly.

== Death ==
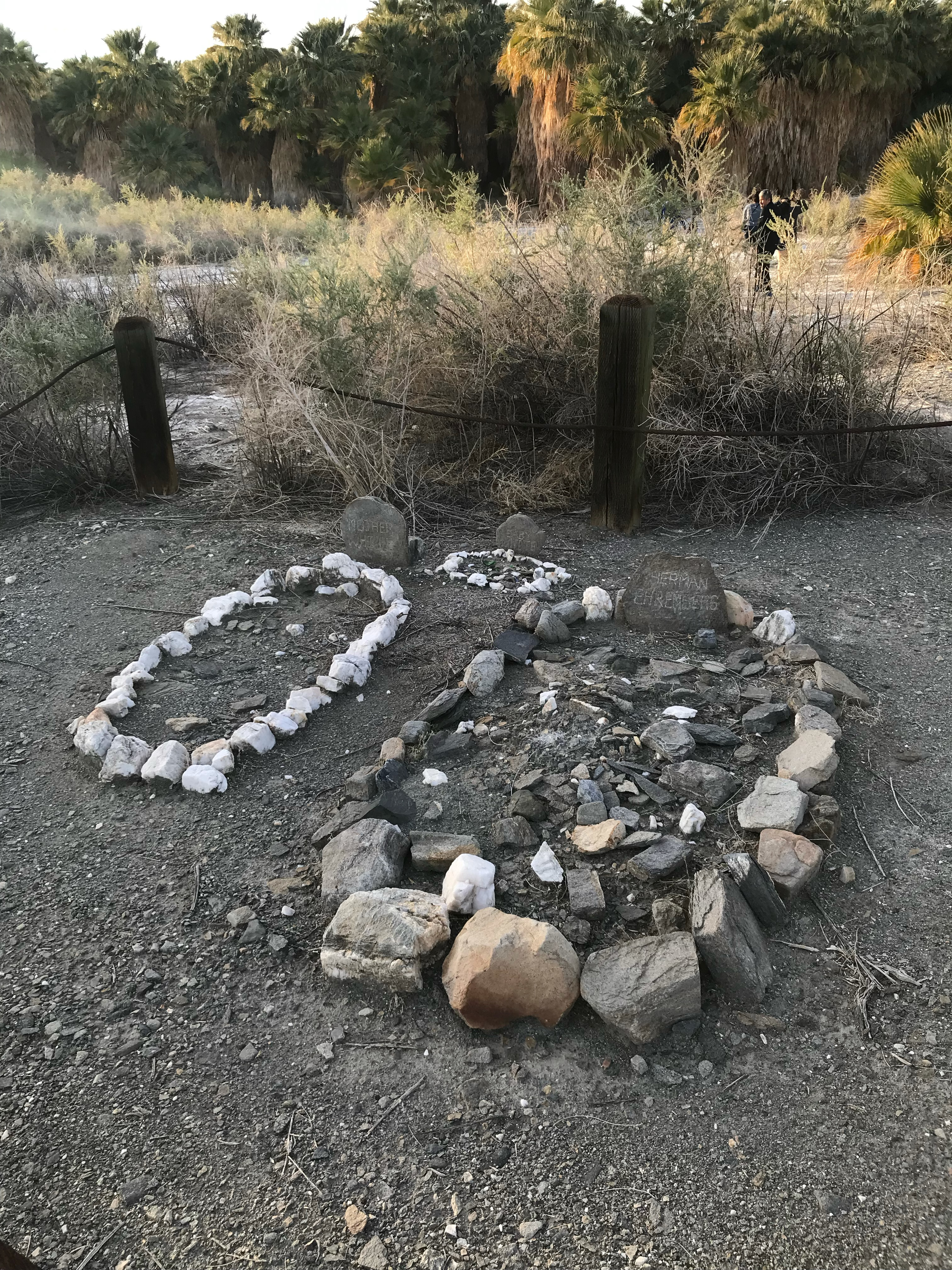
Tomb of Herman Ehrenberg (on right) Located at Dos Palmas

Ehrenberg was murdered on October 9, 1866, in Dos Palmas, California, a stage stop on the Bradshaw Trail.

== Legacy ==
Barry Goldwater called Ehrenberg "one of the greatest surveyors and map makers ever to visit the Western United States". Grand Canyon National Park includes a summit named Ehrenberg Peak, and the town of Mineral City, Arizona, was renamed Ehrenberg after his death.

In 1877, Ehrenberg's friend Poston published an epic poem, Apache-Land, describing Ehrenberg's life. Poston followed this with an article in the Arizona Weekly Star in 1880. In both, Poston claimed that Ehrenberg romanced Queen Pōmare IV of Tahiti in 1846 and 1847, leaving her to pursue further adventures. Poston also gave Ehrenberg a larger role in the Mexican-American War than the evidence suggests he played. According to Crisp, "Poston was notoriously unreliable in the memoirs that he penned late in his long life".

Ehrenberg's book on the Texas Revolution was translated into English in 1925. Ten years later, it was translated again and edited into a book for children named With Milam and Fannin: Adventures of a German Boy in Texas' Revolution. Crisp calls the book "the longest and most vivid eyewitness account of the revolt by a Texan soldier".

== Sources ==
- Brands, H.W. (2005), Lone Star Nation: The Epic Story of the Battle for Texas Independence, Random House, ISBN 978-1-4000-3070-5
- Cady, John Henry (1916), Woon, Basil (ed.), Arizona's yesterday, being the narrative of John H. Cady, pioneer, Western Americana, frontier history of the trans-Mississippi West, 1550-1900; Issue 641 of Travels in the West and Southwest, Times-Minor Printing and Binding House
- Crisp, James E. (April 1999), "In Pursuit of Herman Ehrenberg: A Research Adventure", The Southwestern Historical Quarterly, 102 (4), Texas State Historical Association
- Ehrenberg, Herman (2021). Crisp, James E. (ed.). Inside the Texas Revolution: The Enigmatic Memoir of Herman Ehrenberg. Translated by Brister, Louis E.; Kearney, James C. Austin: Texas State Historical Association. ISBN 978-1-62511-069-5.
- Lamar, Howard Roberts (2000), The far Southwest, 1846–1912; a territorial history, Volume 12 of Yale Western Americana Series, University of New Mexico Press, ISBN 978-0-8263-2248-7
- Lavender, David Sievert (1984), The Southwest, University of New Mexico Press, ISBN 978-0-8263-0736-1
- Ornish, Natalie, "Ehrenberg, Herman", Handbook of Texas, Texas State Historical Association
- Ornish, Natalie (2011), Pioneer Jewish Texans, Texas A&M University Press, ISBN 978-1-60344-423-1
