= Texas und Seine Revolution =

Book by Herman Ehrenberg

Texas und seine Revolution
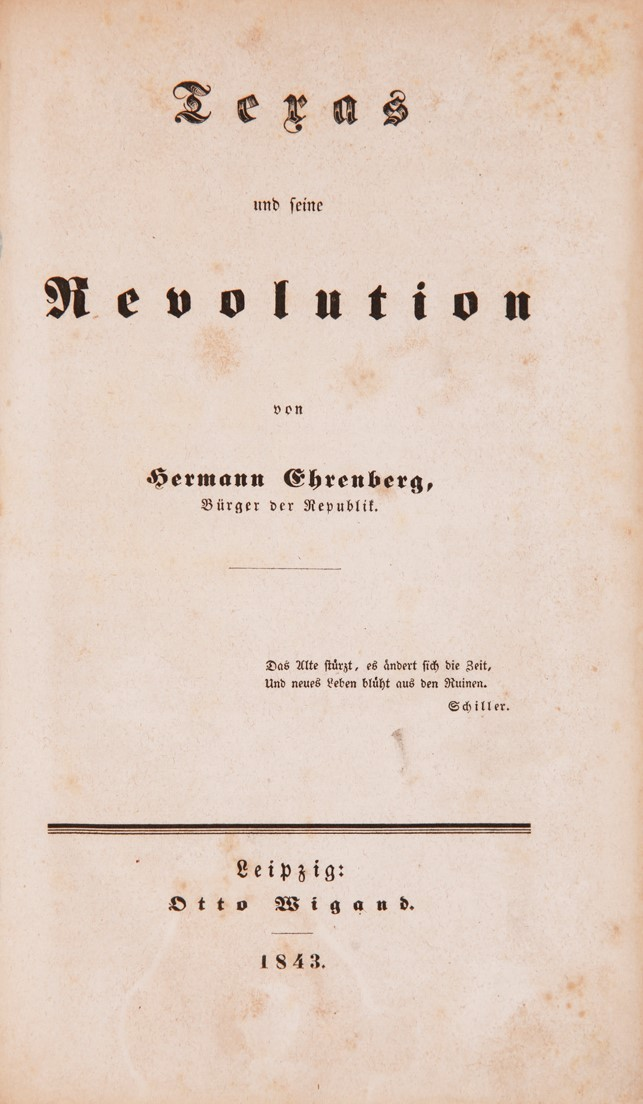
- Title page of the first German edition
- Author: Herman Ehrenberg
- Language: German
- Genre: War memoir
- Publisher: Otto Wigand
- Publication date: 1843
- Publication place: Kingdom of Saxony

Texas und seine Revolution (English: "Texas and Its Revolution") is an account of the Texas Revolution written by Herman Ehrenberg and published in 1843. It was reprinted in 1844 as Der Freiheitskampf in Texas im Jahre 1836 and in 1845 as Fahrten und Schicksale eines Deutschen in Texas.

The book was first translated into English in 1925. In 1935 it was translated again and edited into a book for children titled With Milam and Fannin: Adventures of a German Boy in Texas' Revolution'. Historian James E. Crisp newly translated the original version into English as Inside the Texas Revolution: The Enigmatic Memoir of Herman Ehrenberg in 2021.

Crisp calls the book "the longest and most vivid eyewitness account of the revolt by a Texan soldier".

== Background ==
Herman Ehrenberg was born in Germany in 1816 and immigrated to the United States in 1834. Days after his arrival in New Orleans in 1835, Ehrenberg joined a militia group known as the New Orleans Greys. He claimed to be the third volunteer for the Greys, and he was most likely the youngest member. Ehrenberg participated in several battles in 1835 and 1836 and was taken prisoner by Mexican troops and survived an execution. He kept a diary of his adventures but abandoned the book after his escape from the Mexican troops.

Ehrenberg was given an honorable discharge from the Texian Army on June 2, 1836. He returned to Germany and enrolled at Freiburg University to study mining. In the early 1840s he worked at University of Halle, teaching English. Sometime in the late 1830s or early 1840s, Ehrenberg wrote an account of his service during the Texas Revolution.

== Narrative ==
Both the German version and the Bartholomae translation begin with a chapter describing Mexico before 1835. This is omitted from the Churchill translation, likely due to its extreme anti-clerical content. Chapter two marks Ehrenberg's arrival in New Orleans, a city abuzz with news of the newly declared Texas Revolution. On October 11, Ehrenberg attended a rally, organized by Adolphus Sterne, in support of the Texians in their fight against Mexico. The next day, Ehrenberg enlisted in the volunteer militia company which became known as the New Orleans Greys for the color of the uniforms that they wore.

The Greys were divided into two companies. Ehrenberg was assigned to one led by Captain Thomas H. Breece. He detailed his company's travel upriver to Natchitoches, Louisiana, where they began their overland journey to Texas. Ehrenberg participated in the Siege of Bexar, was briefly part of the Matamoros Expedition, and then joined the garrison stationed at Goliad under James Fannin. Following the Battle of Coleto, Ehrenberg served as translator in Fannin's surrender negotiations. When Mexican troops were ordered to execute the Texian prisoners at the Goliad Massacre, Ehrenberg was one of a very few men to survive.

Ehrenberg wandered the countryside for several days. Unable to find food, Ehrenberg approached Mexican troops and claimed to be a Prussian traveler who needed protection. He traveled with the Mexican army for several weeks before escaping with another Texian shortly after the Mexican defeat at the Battle of San Jacinto on April 21.

== Publication history ==
Ehrenberg's memoir was published in Leipzig, Germany by Otto Wigand in 1843 as Texas und Seine Revolution. It was reprinted without text changes in 1844 as Der Freiheitskampf in Texas im Jahre 1836 and in 1845 as Fahrten und Schicksale eines Deutschen in Texas.

=== English translations ===
Ehrenberg's book was first translated into English in 1925 by Edgar William Bartholomae as his master's thesis at the University of Texas at Austin. Bartholomae received his degree in history, not German, and his graduating committee did not include any professors from the foreign language department. Historian James Crisp notes several glaring discrepancies between the original German and Bartholomae's version and describes it as a "clumsy translation". Only excerpts of Bartholomae's translation have been published. Passages have been quoted in various scholarly works since the 1920s.

In 1930 or 1931, Charlotte Churchill came across a second edition of Ehrenberg's book. Churchill, a cousin of Antoine de Saint-Exupéry, taught French at Our Lady of the Lake College in San Antonio, Texas. After learning that the book was unavailable in English, Churchill began working to translate it. She probably finished the effort in 1932. She thought it fitting that the translation be published on the 100th anniversary of the Texas Revolution and sent her manuscript to John H. McGinnis, who edited the Southwest Review. Two weeks after learning that the translation had been accepted for publication, Churchill quit her job and returned to England. The book contained many anti-Catholic passages and Churchill was told that this made it impossible for her to continue working at a Catholic college.

The translation, published in 1935, was one of several dozen books released by the Tardy Publishing Company in honor of the Texas Centennial. The publisher, William Tardy, was a high school Spanish teacher, and he was determined to publish only books suitable for schoolchildren. To ensure the content was appropriate for children, Tardy instructed the editor Henry Nash Smith, to sanitize the book. Smith removed two chapters and altered or removed single words, sentences, and paragraphs. Crisp counted "sixty-five identifiable omissions from the original text", half marked with ellipses, and half without any notice that the text had been changed. All anti-Catholic content was removed, as was every reference to alcohol, some violence and some racial slurs. Ehrenberg's ending, which described the events after the Goliad Massacre, was replaced by a four-page summary.

After Smith had turned in the final copy of the manuscript, someone else added a note that only "unessential details" had been excised from the translation. This confused many scholars into taking the book as a primary source, which was not the intention of the publication. Smith was troubled that the book was marketed as being historically accurate and reliable, with no mention of the excised text. Smith later left the book off of his resume, and later publishers did not connect the editor of this book with the man who later became a well known scholar.

The book was illustrated by Jerry Bywaters. It included an introduction written by historian Herbert P. Gambrell. Gambrell was given only two weeks to produce several pages of biographical information about Ehrenberg. He relied heavily on an 1880 work by Gustav Körner detailing influential Germans in 19th-century America. Historian James Crisp maintains there is "not a shred of evidence to suggest that this story is true". With Milam and Fannin was marketed to public schools in Texas. It was reprinted in 1968 by Pemberton Press.

In 2021, historian James E. Crisp edited a newly printed, fresh translation of Ehrenberg's memoir with commentary. It was published by the Texas State Historical Association.

== Analysis ==
The original text was strewn with anti-clerical and anti-Catholic commentary. Much of this was displayed as exposition from other individuals. As Smith wrote in a letter to Dobie, "Ehrenberg had a regrettable tendency to write florid speeches and put them into the mouths of historic personages". As an example, Ehrenberg includes a speech ostensibly given by Adolphus Sterne that is littered with anti-clericalism. Sterne was the son of an Orthodox Jew and a Lutheran, but he had married a Catholic girl in 1828 and converted to Catholicism after that. Other writings of Stern, including his diary, show no anti-Catholic opinions.

Smith described the ending which he had replaced with a summary as Ehrenberg's "rather clumsy efforts to write humorous fiction", maintaining that "Ehrenberg's real participation in important events ceased when he attached himself to Urrea's command".

== Reception and legacy ==
Crisp, who as of 2011 is working on a new translation, calls the book "the longest and most vivid eyewitness account of the revolt by a Texan soldier". In September 1936, historian J. Frank Dobie added With Milam and Fannin to the reading list for his "legendary course" at the University of Texas at Austin, "Life and Literature of the Southwest". Since then the book "has become a standard source for historians of the Texas revolution, as well as for biographers of Sam Houston". Crisp laments, however, that many scholars seem to give "inappropriate ... interpretive weight" to the work, given that it was written from memory years after the events depicted, and that it was then translated from its original language to English.

According to Crisp, Smith's efforts in editing were a "misguided effort to preserve the truth by sanitizing it". The removal of some of the text left scholars who rely on the 1935 version without some "potentially important political and military information" about the Texas Revolution. Including some of the other text might have also provided clues to scholars that the speeches Ehrenberg attributed to Houston and others were not necessarily the words and thoughts of those men.

Dobie reviewed the book for the Dallas Morning News in 1935 and said book "moves forward with a directness as certain as the westward march of empire; it hold, it grips." Dobie lamented the omissions, saying "I want even the tail of this [book] and I'd prefer the warts that seem to have been sliced off." Historian Rudolph Biesele, who was fluent in German, wrote in a review of the 1935 publication for The Journal of Southern History that Churchill's translation was "free and fair". Biesele concurred with Dobie that the full version of the book would have been welcomed.

In a review of the 1968 reprint, published in the Southwestern Historical Quarterly, Irene Marshall King says that "Ehrenberg's is convincing because he was a participant in almost every event he relates. His style of writing is fluent and pleasing, and his descriptions are enjoyable." Crisp counters that the writing style King enjoys is likely due to Churchill's word choice, not Ehrenberg's.

== Sources ==
- Brands, H.W. (2005). Lone Star Nation: The Epic Story of the Battle for Texas Independence. Random House. ISBN 978-1-4000-3070-5.
- Crisp, James E. (April 1999). "In Pursuit of Herman Ehrenberg: A Research Adventure". The Southwestern Historical Quarterly. 102 (4). Texas State Historical Association: 423–7.
- Crisp, James E. (October 1993). "Sam Houston's Speechwriters: The Grad Student, the Teenager, the Editors, and the Historians". Southwestern Historical Quarterly. 97 (2). Texas State Historical Association: 203–237.
- Ehrenberg, Herman (2021). Crisp, James E. (ed.). Inside the Texas Revolution: The Enigmatic Memoir of Herman Ehrenberg. Translated by Brister, Louis E.; Kearney, James C. Austin: Texas State Historical Association. ISBN 978-1-62511-069-5.
- King, Irene Marshall (October 1969). "Book reviews". Southwestern Historical Quarterly. 73 (2). Texas State Historical Association: 296–7.
- Ornish, Natalie. "Ehrenberg, Herman". Handbook of Texas. Texas State Historical Association.
- Ornish, Natalie (2011). Pioneer Jewish Texans. Texas A&M University Press. ISBN 978-1-60344-423-1.
