= 2019 FIM Motocross World Championship =

Champions of the world motocross 2019

The 2019 FIM Motocross World Championship was the 63rd FIM Motocross World Championship season. It included 18 events, started at Neuquén in Argentina on 3 March, and ended in Shanghai, China on 15 September. In the main MXGP class, Jeffrey Herlings was the defending champion after taking his first MXGP class title and his fourth title overall in 2018. In the MX2 class, Jorge Prado was the reigning champion, after taking his first world title in 2018.

== Race calendar and results ==
The championship was contested over eighteen rounds in Europe, Asia and South America.

=== MXGP ===
Round	Date	Grand Prix	Location	Race 1 Winner	Race 2 Winner	Round Winner	Report
1	3 March	MXGP of Patagonia Argentina	Neuquén	(Italy) Tony Cairoli	(Italy) Tony Cairoli	(Italy) Tony Cairoli	Report
2	24 March	(United Kingdom) MXGP of Great Britain	Matterley Basin	(Italy) Tony Cairoli	(Slovenia) Tim Gajser	(Italy) Tony Cairoli	Report
3	31 March	MXGP of The Netherlands	Valkenswaard	(Italy) Tony Cairoli	(Italy) Tony Cairoli	(Italy) Tony Cairoli	Report
4	7 April	(Italy) MXGP of Trentino	Trentino	(Slovenia) Tim Gajser	(Slovenia) Tim Gajser	(Slovenia) Tim Gajser	Report
5	12 May	(Italy) Monster Energy MXGP of Lombardia	Mantua	(Italy) Tony Cairoli	(Italy) Tony Cairoli	(Italy) Tony Cairoli	Report
6	19 May	MXGP of Portugal	Agueda	(Slovenia) Tim Gajser	(Slovenia) Tim Gajser	(Slovenia) Tim Gajser	Report
7	26 May	MXGP of France	St Jean d'Angely	(Slovenia) Tim Gajser	(Slovenia) Tim Gajser	(Slovenia) Tim Gajser	Report
8	9 June	PATRON MXGP of Russia	Orlyonok	(Slovenia) Tim Gajser	(Slovenia) Tim Gajser	(Slovenia) Tim Gajser	Report
9	16 June	MXGP of Latvia	Kegums	(Netherlands) Jeffrey Herlings	(Slovenia) Tim Gajser	(Slovenia) Tim Gajser	Report
10	23 June	MXGP of Germany	Teutschenthal	(Slovenia) Tim Gajser	(Slovenia) Tim Gajser	(Slovenia) Tim Gajser	Report
11	7 July	MXGP of Indonesia	Palembang	(Slovenia) Tim Gajser	(France) Romain Febvre	(Slovenia) Tim Gajser	Report
12	14 July	(Indonesia) MXGP of Asia	Semarang	(Slovenia) Tim Gajser	(Slovenia) Tim Gajser	(Slovenia) Tim Gajser	Report
13	28 July	MXGP of Czech Republic	Loket	(France) Romain Febvre	(France) Romain Febvre	(France) Romain Febvre	Report
14	4 August	MXGP of Belgium	Lommel	(France) Romain Febvre	(United Kingdom) Max Anstie	(Slovenia) Tim Gajser	Report
15	18 August	MXGP of Italy	Imola	(Netherlands) Glenn Coldenhoff	(Netherlands) Glenn Coldenhoff	(Netherlands) Glenn Coldenhoff	Report
16	25 August	MXGP of Sweden	Uddevalla	(Netherlands) Glenn Coldenhoff	(Slovenia) Tim Gajser	(Netherlands) Glenn Coldenhoff	Report
17	8 September	MXGP of Turkey	Afyonkarahisar	(Netherlands) Jeffrey Herlings	(Netherlands) Jeffrey Herlings	(Netherlands) Jeffrey Herlings	Report
18	15 September	MXGP of China	Shanghai	(Netherlands) Glenn Coldenhoff	(Netherlands) Jeffrey Herlings	(Netherlands) Jeffrey Herlings	Report

=== MX2 ===
Round	Date	Grand Prix	Location	Race 1 Winner	Race 2 Winner	Round Winner	Report
1	3 March	MXGP of Patagonia Argentina	Neuquén	(Spain) Jorge Prado	(Spain) Jorge Prado	(Spain) Jorge Prado	Report
2	24 March	(United Kingdom) MXGP of Great Britain	Matterley Basin	(Denmark) Thomas Kjær Olsen	(Denmark) Thomas Kjær Olsen	(Denmark) Thomas Kjær Olsen	Report
3	31 March	MXGP of The Netherlands	Valkenswaard	(Spain) Jorge Prado	(Spain) Jorge Prado	(Spain) Jorge Prado	Report
4	7 April	(Italy) MXGP of Trentino	Trentino	(Spain) Jorge Prado	(Spain) Jorge Prado	(Spain) Jorge Prado	Report
5	12 May	(Italy) Monster Energy MXGP of Lombardia	Mantua	(Spain) Jorge Prado	(Spain) Jorge Prado	(Spain) Jorge Prado	Report
6	19 May	MXGP of Portugal	Agueda	(Spain) Jorge Prado	(Spain) Jorge Prado	(Spain) Jorge Prado	Report
7	26 May	MXGP of France	St Jean d'Angely	(Belgium) Jago Geerts	(Spain) Jorge Prado	(Spain) Jorge Prado	Report
8	9 June	PATRON MXGP of Russia	Orlyonok	(Spain) Jorge Prado	(Spain) Jorge Prado	(Spain) Jorge Prado	Report
9	16 June	MXGP of Latvia	Kegums	(Spain) Jorge Prado	(Spain) Jorge Prado	(Spain) Jorge Prado	Report
10	23 June	MXGP of Germany	Teutschenthal	(Spain) Jorge Prado	(Spain) Jorge Prado	(Spain) Jorge Prado	Report
11	7 July	MXGP of Indonesia	Palembang	(Spain) Jorge Prado	(Denmark) Thomas Kjær Olsen	(Spain) Jorge Prado	Report
12	14 July	(Indonesia) MXGP of Asia	Semarang	(Spain) Jorge Prado	(Spain) Jorge Prado	(Spain) Jorge Prado	Report
13	28 July	MXGP of Czech Republic	Loket	(Spain) Jorge Prado	(Spain) Jorge Prado	(Spain) Jorge Prado	Report
14	4 August	MXGP of Belgium	Lommel	(Spain) Jorge Prado	(Spain) Jorge Prado	(Spain) Jorge Prado	Report
15	18 August	MXGP of Italy	Imola	(Spain) Jorge Prado	(Spain) Jorge Prado	(Spain) Jorge Prado	Report
16	25 August	MXGP of Sweden	Uddevalla	(Spain) Jorge Prado	(Netherlands) Calvin Vlaanderen	(France) Tom Vialle	Report
17	8 September	MXGP of Turkey	Afyonkarahisar	(Spain) Jorge Prado	(Spain) Jorge Prado	(Spain) Jorge Prado	Report
18	15 September	MXGP of China	Shanghai	(Spain) Jorge Prado	(Spain) Jorge Prado	(Spain) Jorge Prado	Report

== MXGP ==
=== Entry list ===
Officially Approved Teams & Riders
Team	Constructor	No	Rider	Rounds
Monster Energy Wilvo Yamaha Official MXGP Team	Yamaha	4	(Switzerland) Arnaud Tonus	All
Monster Energy Wilvo Yamaha Official MXGP Team	Yamaha	21	(France) Gautier Paulin	All
Team Gebben Van Venrooy Kawasaki Racing	Kawasaki	6	(France) Benoît Paturel	4–9
Team Gebben Van Venrooy Kawasaki Racing	Kawasaki	77	(Italy) Alessandro Lupino	1–8, 13–17
A1M Husqvarna	Husqvarna	7	(Estonia) Tanel Leok	2–18
A1M Husqvarna	Husqvarna	621	(Estonia) Andero Lusbo	11–12
KTM Sarholz Racing Team	KTM	12	(Germany) Max Nagl	1, 10
KTM Sarholz Racing Team	KTM	226	(Germany) Tom Koch	2–4, 10, 13–16
JD Gunnex KTM Racing Team	KTM	17	(Spain) José Butrón	1–4
JD Gunnex KTM Racing Team	KTM	831	(Poland) Tomasz Wysocki	13
JWR Yamaha Racing	Yamaha	18	(Russia) Vsevolod Brylyakov	3–10, 13–16
JWR Yamaha Racing	Yamaha	22	(Belgium) Kevin Strijbos	5–10, 13–18
JWR Yamaha Racing	Yamaha	297	(Sweden) Anton Gole	2–7, 9–10, 14–16
RFX KTM Racing powered by PAR Homes	KTM	24	(United Kingdom) Shaun Simpson	1–7, 13–17
RFX KTM Racing powered by PAR Homes	KTM	360	(United Kingdom) Nathan Dixon	10
Monster Energy Kawasaki Racing Team	Kawasaki	25	(Belgium) Clément Desalle	1–8
Monster Energy Kawasaki Racing Team	Kawasaki	33	(Belgium) Julien Lieber	1–10
Monster Energy Kawasaki Racing Team	Kawasaki	100	(United Kingdom) Tommy Searle	13–17
Rockstar Energy Husqvarna Factory Racing	Husqvarna	27	(Lithuania) Arminas Jasikonis	All
Rockstar Energy Husqvarna Factory Racing	Husqvarna	41	(Latvia) Pauls Jonass	All
Hutten Metaal Yamaha Racing	Yamaha	34	(Netherlands) Micha Boy de Waal	2–3, 5–7, 9–10, 13–17
Hutten Metaal Yamaha Racing	Yamaha	94	(Netherlands) Sven van der Mierden	2–6, 9–10
Hutten Metaal Yamaha Racing	Yamaha	127	(Venezuela) Anthony Rodríguez	15–17
SixtyTwo Motosport Husqvarna	Husqvarna	62	(Slovenia) Klemen Gerčar	4–5, 7, 9–10, 13–15
NR83 Team	KTM	83	(Belgium) Nathan Renkens	2–3, 17–18
NR83 Team	KTM	595	(Belgium) Cedric Grobben	13–14
Red Bull KTM Factory Racing	KTM	84	(Netherlands) Jeffrey Herlings	8–9, 16–18
Team Honda SR Motoblouz	Honda	89	(Belgium) Jeremy Van Horebeek	All
Team Honda SR Motoblouz	Honda	241	(France) Maxime Desprey	7
Monster Energy Yamaha Factory MXGP	Yamaha	91	(Switzerland) Jeremy Seewer	All
Monster Energy Yamaha Factory MXGP	Yamaha	111	(Australia) Dean Ferris	2
Monster Energy Yamaha Factory MXGP	Yamaha	461	(France) Romain Febvre	1, 6–16
920 Fly Group	Husqvarna	92	(Spain) Ander Valentín	2, 6
Scandinavian Racing Sports	KTM	93	(Sweden) Jonathan Bengtsson	2–5, 7, 9–10, 13–14, 16
Team GBO Motorsport	KTM	95	(Italy) Simone Furlotti	13
Standing Construct KTM	KTM	99	(United Kingdom) Max Anstie	1–6, 8–15
Standing Construct KTM	KTM	128	(Italy) Ivo Monticelli	All
Standing Construct KTM	KTM	259	(Netherlands) Glenn Coldenhoff	All
BOS Factory	Kawasaki	100	(United Kingdom) Tommy Searle	1–10
BOS Factory	Kawasaki	127	(Venezuela) Anthony Rodríguez	13–14
BOS Factory	Kawasaki	777	(Russia) Evgeny Bobryshev	1, 7–8
North Europe Racing KTM	KTM	152	(Bulgaria) Petar Petrov	2–9, 14–18
North Europe Racing KTM	KTM	212	(Belgium) Jeffrey Dewulf	3, 6, 9–10, 14
Team HRC	Honda	189	(Netherlands) Brian Bogers	1–15, 17–18
Team HRC	Honda	243	(Slovenia) Tim Gajser	All
Red Bull KTM De Carli Factory Racing	KTM	222	(Italy) Tony Cairoli	1–9
Ghidinelli Racing Team	Yamaha	321	(Italy) Samuele Bernardini	2, 4–5, 7, 10, 13, 15
Team Iannarone	KTM	471	(Ukraine) Volodymyr Tarasov	2–3, 7, 9–10, 13, 15
AG Racing	Husqvarna	555	(Russia) Artem Guryev	2–10, 14–15, 17
Team VHR Racing KTM	KTM	911	(France) Jordi Tixier	1–3, 6–10, 13–18
Wild Card Teams & Riders
Team	Constructor	No	Rider	Rounds
KMP Honda Racing	Honda	13	(Switzerland) Valentin Guillod	10
KMP Honda Racing	Honda	330	(United States) Austin Root	5
KMP Honda Racing	Honda	926	(Belgium) Jérémy Delincé	10
	KTM	15	(Italy) Davide Bonini	4–5
SN Motorsports Kawasaki	Kawasaki	20	(France) Grégory Aranda	7
Hastenberg Racing	Honda	23	(Netherlands) Menno Aussems	14
Phoenix Tools Apico Kawasaki	Kawasaki	37	(Estonia) Gert Krestinov	3, 9
	KTM	38	(France) Dan Houzet	7
SS100 KTM Motosport	KTM	54	(Turkey) Şakir Şenkalaycı	17
	KTM	59	(China) Tianwei Peng	18
Team Ausio Yamaha Yamalube	Yamaha	96	(Spain) Jorge Zaragoza	5–7, 13
Husqvarna SKS Racing	Husqvarna	107	(Netherlands) Lars van Berkel	3, 14
Team Castrol Power 1 Suzuki	Suzuki	108	(Germany) Stefan Ekerold	10
Team OneSixEight	Husqvarna	110	(Indonesia) Aldi Lazaroni	11–12
Team MX 114	KTM	114	(France) Pascal Dorseuil	17
Team Becker Racing	Yamaha	126	(Norway) Håkon Mindrebøe	16
	Husqvarna	131	(Netherlands) Jordi van Nobelen	11–12
KTM Estonia	KTM	132	(Estonia) Karel Kutsar	9
Kros Team Gaerne	Honda	143	(Italy) Davide De Bortoli	4–5, 13
Team Bratschi Repuestos	KTM	146	(Uruguay) Francisco Urrutia	1
2-Stroke Revolution Racing	Husqvarna	149	(Germany) Dennis Ullrich	7
Cab Screen Honda Racing	Honda	151	(Estonia) Harri Kullas	2–3, 9
	Husqvarna	162	(Indonesia) Farhan Hendra	11–12
Team La Higuerita	KTM	171	(Argentina) Juan Pablo Luzzardi	1
Team Musso Extreme	Honda	175	(Argentina) Víctor Garrido	1
HT Group Racing Team	Gas Gas	178	(Czech Republic) Václav Kovář	13
Avant Honda Genuine Oil	Honda	179	(Argentina) Joaquín Poli	1
MSR Redline Yamaha	Yamaha	180	(United Kingdom) Josh Spinks	2
	KTM	185	(Turkey) Mehmet Çelik	17
Arjan Brouwer MX Team	Husqvarna	191	(Finland) René Rannikko	14
Honda Racing Brazil	Honda	220	(Peru) Jetro Salazar	1
Honda Racing Brazil	Honda	230	(Brazil) Hector Assunção	1
Barry Francis Motorcycles	KTM	227	(Australia) Adam Coles	11–12
	KTM	228	(Mexico) Eduardo Andrade	11
DW Racing	Kawasaki	238	(Germany) Lukas Platt	14
	Husqvarna	244	(Togo) Madjade Nakpane	12, 18
Extreme Motorsport	Suzuki	249	(Czech Republic) Rudolf Plch	13
	KTM	251	(Spain) Bruno Darias	11–12
	KTM	261	(Turkey) Murat Başterzi	17
3C Racing Team	Yamaha	267	(Italy) Edoardo Bersanelli	15
Husqvarna Latvia/A1M Husqvarna	Husqvarna	291	(Latvia) Matiss Karro	2–3, 9
Big Balls MX	Suzuki	306	(Greece) Panagiotis Kouzis	16
Monster Energy Honda Greece	Honda	306	(Greece) Panagiotis Kouzis	17
Chaiyan's MXCamp Racing Team	Yamaha	311	(Thailand) Chaiyan Romphan	18
Westside Racing Team	KTM	320	(Denmark) Mathias Gryning	16
Tech32 Racing MX	Husqvarna	324	(France) Maxime Charlier	7, 13
	KTM	336	(Australia) Lewis Stewart	11–12
GugaMX	Suzuki	373	(Portugal) Sandro Peixe	6
SJT KTM Estonia Kahro Racing Team	KTM	411	(Estonia) Erki Kahro	
Team HTS KTM	KTM	521	(Hungary) Bence Szvoboda	5
	Husqvarna	531	(Italy) Francesco Galligari	18
	Husqvarna	599	(Russia) Evgeny Mikhaylov	8
	Yamaha	618	(China) Jianhao Xu	18
DMX Motorsport	KTM	622	(Italy) Gianluca Di Marziantonio	4–5
	KTM	626	(Australia) Joel Milesevic	12
	KTM	727	(China) Liansong Deng	18
SHR Motorsports	KTM	760	(Austria) Pascal Rauchenecker	4–5, 10
Freytes Motorsport	Honda	789	(Bolivia) Marco Antezana	1
Chambers Racing	Husqvarna	803	(United Kingdom) Jake Millward	2
WPM Motors	KTM	853	(Netherlands) Nino Dekker	14
Dream Team Suzuki Valenti	Suzuki	878	(Italy) Stefano Pezzuto	4
GEPA/Pablo MX Team	Kawasaki	981	(Belgium) Tim Louis	3

=== Riders Championship ===
Pos	No.	Rider	Bike	ARG (Argentina)		GBR (United Kingdom)		NED (Netherlands)		TRE (Italy)		LOM (Italy)		POR (Portugal)		FRA (France)		RUS (Russia)		LAT (Latvia)		GER (Germany)		SMS (Indonesia)		JTG (Indonesia)		CZE (Czech Republic)		BEL (Belgium)		ITA (Italy)		SWE (Sweden)		TUR (Turkey)		CHN (China)		Points
1	243	(Slovenia) Tim Gajser	Honda	2	2	3	1	7	2	1	1	10	6	1	1	1	1	1	1	6	1	1	1	1	2	1	1	2	2	2	2	5	2	3	1	6	3	3	4	782
2	91	(Switzerland) Jeremy Seewer	Yamaha	10	11	8	5	8	6	8	14	7	9	4	10	4	8	5	3	5	3	3	8	3	4	3	4	3	3	4	5	2	3	7	5	4	8	4	3	580
3	259	(Netherlands) Glenn Coldenhoff	KTM	17	18	12	8	17	10	14	7	8	5	8	8	11	7	8	10	12	8	6	6	5	3	4	7	13	8	3	3	1	1	1	2	3	2	1	2	535
4	21	(France) Gautier Paulin	Yamaha	5	5	2	3	3	13	3	3	6	4	15	5	16	5	Ret	8	8	11	5	4	7	5	9	8	4	4	9	10	3	4	6	8	5	6	8	6	527
5	4	(Switzerland) Arnaud Tonus	Yamaha	Ret	10	6	Ret	13	20	4	4	25	10	3	3	3	3	2	2	2	4	2	3	6	20	2	3	10	5	5	14	4	16	12	6	7	16	DNS	DNS	462
6	41	(Latvia) Pauls Jonass	Husqvarna	9	12	14	11	11	14	11	19	2	3	7	7	Ret	20	7	6	17	6	10	2	8	7	Ret	2	6	7	7	11	6	5	4	3	2	5	5	7	458
7	27	(Lithuania) Arminas Jasikonis	Husqvarna	8	8	9	4	4	4	9	5	3	15	11	11	7	11	9	11	Ret	7	12	7	10	10	5	9	5	9	8	6	7	13	10	12	10	13	6	10	442
8	89	(Belgium) Jeremy Van Horebeek	Honda	6	3	5	6	5	3	10	Ret	Ret	16	12	12	13	9	16	12	7	5	8	9	11	11	6	10	7	6	6	7	13	11	5	7	9	7	7	5	433
9	461	(France) Romain Febvre	Yamaha	3	Ret									9	6	5	2	3	9	4	2	4	12	4	1	Ret	5	1	1	1	4	10	6	2	Ret					384
10	222	(Italy) Tony Cairoli	KTM	1	1	1	2	1	1	2	2	1	1	2	2	2	17	12	4	3	Ret																			358
11	128	(Italy) Ivo Monticelli	KTM	15	16	23	10	18	11	5	6	Ret	Ret	14	16	12	28	15	14	10	10	14	10	9	12	8	11	16	21	11	8	Ret	DNS	DNS	DNS	8	4	10	8	267
12	99	(United Kingdom) Max Anstie	KTM	Ret	4	7	14	16	9	Ret	22	4	Ret	Ret	DNS			10	15	9	13	7	5	2	6	7	6	8	10	Ret	1	DNS	DNS							256
13	189	(Netherlands) Brian Bogers	Honda	16	17	21	22	12	Ret	19	9	20	2	20	21	21	15	17	17	18	12	9	11	12	8	11	13	9	12	15	9	14	Ret			13	11	11	11	228
14	25	(Belgium) Clément Desalle	Kawasaki	4	6	4	7	2	5	12	Ret	5	7	6	4	6	4	Ret	DNS																					208
15	7	(Estonia) Tanel Leok	Husqvarna			13	16	14	17	15	16	11	21	18	18	10	18	18	20	14	15	16	16	13	9	10	12	17	15	14	15	15	10	20	19	18	18	12	13	198
16	911	(France) Jordi Tixier	KTM	14	15	18	12	10	Ret					22	22	19	19	13	13	13	14	11	Ret					Ret	16	10	13	12	8	17	11	12	10	9	9	185
17	33	(Belgium) Julien Lieber	Kawasaki	7	14	10	20	6	7	13	12	14	Ret	5	9	9	6	6	5	Ret	9	Ret	DNS																	184
18	24	(United Kingdom) Shaun Simpson	KTM	11	9	16	9	9	8	7	11	9	Ret	13	13	15	14											11	14	12	20	Ret	Ret	14	20	16	15			175
19	84	(Netherlands) Jeffrey Herlings	KTM															4	7	1	DNS													Ret	4	1	1	2	1	172
20	100	(United Kingdom) Tommy Searle	Kawasaki	13	7	11	15	24	18	17	8	21	13	16	Ret	14	13	DNS	DNS	11	Ret	Ret	14					12	25	DNS	DNS	8	7	8	10	DNS	DNS			163
21	77	(Italy) Alessandro Lupino	Kawasaki	12	13	Ret	13	Ret	12	6	10	16	19	10	14	8	16	Ret	DNS									Ret	17	DNS	DNS	9	9	11	Ret	15	12			156
22	22	(Belgium) Kevin Strijbos	Yamaha									13	14	21	Ret	18	10	14	16	19	Ret	Ret	DNS					14	11	13	19	11	12	9	9	11	9	Ret	DNS	135
23	18	(Russia) Vsevolod Brylyakov	Yamaha					22	25	22	15	12	11	25	15	Ret	26	19	21	21	16	19	17					15	13	17	Ret	16	18	16	13					83
24	6	(France) Benoît Paturel	Kawasaki							16	13	15	8	17	17	17	12	11	19	DNS	DNS																			65
25	152	(Bulgaria) Petar Petrov	KTM			20	21	20	19	18	Ret	18	Ret	19	19	Ret	Ret	20	18	15	Ret									Ret	DNS	Ret	17	18	18	17	19	13	12	57
26	297	(Sweden) Anton Gole	Yamaha			17	18	19	22	Ret	Ret	23	18	24	20	20	24			Ret	19	15	13							DNS	DNS	20	DNS	13	16					44
27	34	(Netherlands) Micha-Boy de Waal	Yamaha			27	28	27	Ret			24	Ret	26	Ret	29	27			16	24	18	19					27	19	20	16	17	Ret	15	14	23	17			39
28	336	(Australia) Lewis Stewart	KTM																					15	14	12	14													29
29	621	(Estonia) Andero Lusbo	Husqvarna																					14	13	13	15													29
30	127	(Venezuela) Anthony Rodriguez	Kawasaki																									20	22	DNS	DNS									28
30	127	(Venezuela) Anthony Rodriguez	Yamaha																													18	19	19	15	14	14			28
31	321	(Italy) Samuele Bernardini	Yamaha			33	25			21	18	19	12			24	Ret					Ret	20					19	20			21	14							25
32	226	(Germany) Tom Koch	KTM			32	27	28	27	25	Ret											23	22					18	18	19	17	19	15	21	17					24
33	227	(Australia) Adam Coles	Husqvarna																					16	15	15	16													22
34	151	(Estonia) Harri Kullas	Honda			19	17	15	15											24	20																			19
35	212	(Belgium) Jeffrey Dewulf	KTM					DNS	DNS					23	Ret					Ret	21	20	18							16	12									18
36	83	(Belgium) Nathan Renkens	KTM			24	23	DNS	DNS																											19	20	14	14	17
37	17	(Spain) José Butrón	KTM	19	19	22	19	23	16	20	17																													16
38	13	(Switzerland) Valentin Guillod	Honda																			13	15																	14
39	251	(Spain) Bruno Darias	KTM																					20	16	14	Ret													13
40	94	(Netherlands) Sven Van der Mierden	Yamaha			30	24	21	24	DNS	DNS	17	17	27	Ret					20	17	24	26																	13
41	131	(Netherlands) Jordi van Nobelen	Husqvarna																					17	18	18	18													13
42	311	(Thailand) Chaiyan Romphan	Yamaha																																			15	15	12
43	618	(China) Jianhao Xu	Yamaha																																			16	16	10
44	162	(Indonesia) Farhan Hendro	Husqvarna																					18	19	17	20													10
45	110	(Indonesia) Aldi Lazaroni	Husqvarna																					19	17	19	19													10
46	626	(Australia) Joel Milesevic	KTM																							16	17													9
47	244	(Togo) Madjade Nakpane	Husqvarna																							20	21											17	17	9
48	111	(Australia) Dean Ferris	Yamaha			15	Ret																																	6
49	760	(Austria) Pascal Rauchenecker	KTM							24	20	Ret	20									17	21																	6
50	107	(Netherlands) Lars van Berkel	Husqvarna					Ret	23																					18	18									6
51	531	(Italy) Francesco Galligari	Husqvarna																																			18	18	6
52	727	(China) Liansong Deng	KTM																																			19	19	4
53	37	(Estonia) Gert Krestinov	Kawasaki					25	21											23	18																			3
54	179	(Argentina) Joaquín Poli	Honda	18	21																																			3
55	59	(China) Tianwei Peng	KTM																																			20	20	2
56	555	(Russia) Artem Guryev	Husqvarna			34	30	30	29	26	25	28	24	29	26	28	29	Ret	Ret	DNS	DNS	Ret	DNS							DNS	DNS	Ret	23			20	21			1
57	171	(Argentina) Juan Pablo Luzzardi	KTM	21	20																																			1
58	62	(Slovenia) Klemen Gerčar	Husqvarna							27	26	27	22			Ret	31			Ret	25	22	28					DNS	DNS	DNS	DNS	22	20							1
59	220	(Peru) Jetro Salazar	Honda	20	Ret																																			1
	143	(Italy) Davide De Bortoli	Honda							23	21	26	23															22	Ret											0
	306	(Greece) Panagiotis Kouzis	Suzuki																															25	24					0
	306	(Greece) Panagiotis Kouzis	Honda																																	21	22			0
	595	(Belgium) Cedric Grobben	KTM																									26	26	22	21									0
	599	(Russia) Evgeny Mikhaylov	Husqvarna															21	22																					0
	238	(Germany) Lukas Platt	Kawasaki																											21	22									0
	96	(Spain) Jorge Zaragoza	Yamaha									Ret	Ret	28	23	26	21											Ret	Ret											0
	926	(Belgium) Jérémy Delincé	Honda																			21	23																	0
	267	(Italy) Edoardo Bersanelli	Yamaha																													23	21							0
	126	(Norway) Håkon Mindrebøe	Yamaha																															23	21					0
	95	(Italy) Simone Furlotti	KTM																									21	Ret											0
	93	(Sweden) Jonathan Bengtsson	KTM			29	26	26	26	Ret	24	22	Ret			25	Ret			Ret	22	26	27					23	Ret	Ret	Ret			22	23					0
	241	(France) Maxime Desprey	Honda													22	22																							0
	471	(Ukraine) Volodymyr Tarasov	KTM			31	29	Ret	30							27	30			Ret	23	25	25					24	23			Ret	22							0
	175	(Argentina) Víctor Garrido	Honda	23	22																																			0
	114	(France) Pascal Dorseuil	KTM																																	22	23			0
	320	(Denmark) Mathias Gryning	KTM																															24	22					0
	789	(Bolivia) Marco Antezana	Honda	22	Ret																																			0
	132	(Estonia) Karel Kutsar	KTM																	22	Ret																			0
	853	(Netherlands) Nino Dekker	KTM																											23	23									0
	149	(Germany) Dennis Ullrich	Husqvarna													23	25																							0
	20	(France) Grégory Aranda	Kawasaki													Ret	23																							0
	15	(Italy) Davide Bonini	KTM							Ret	23	Ret	DNS																											0
	23	(Netherlands) Menno Aussems	Honda																											24	24									0
	185	(Turkey) Mehmet Çelik	KTM																																	24	24			0
	249	(Czech Republic) Rudolf Plch	Suzuki																									25	24											0
	108	(Germany) Stefan Ekerold	Suzuki																			Ret	24																	0
	191	(Finland) René Rannikko	Husqvarna																											25	25									0
	373	(Portugal) Sandro Peixe	Suzuki											30	25																									0
	92	(Spain) Ander Valentín	Husqvarna			25	Ret							Ret	DNS																									0
	54	(Turkey) Şakir Şenkalaycı	KTM																																	25	Ret			0
	803	(United Kingdom) Jake Millward	Husqvarna			26	31																																	0
	360	(United Kingdom) Nathan Dixon	KTM																			27	29																	0
	324	(France) Maxime Charlier	Husqvarna													30	Ret											28	27											0
	291	(Latvia) Matiss Karro	Husqvarna			28	Ret	29	28											DNS	DNS																			0
	777	(Russia) Evgeny Bobryshev	Kawasaki	DNS	DNS											Ret	Ret	Ret	DNS																					0
	12	(Germany) Max Nagl	KTM	Ret	Ret																	DNS	DNS																	0
	622	(Italy) Gianluca Di Marziantonio	KTM							Ret	Ret	DNS	DNS																											0
	230	(Brazil) Hector Assunção	Honda	Ret	Ret																																			0
	38	(France) Dan Houzet	KTM													Ret	Ret																							0
	146	(Uruguay) Francisco Urrutia	KTM	Ret	DNS																																			0
	521	(Hungary) Bence Szvoboda	KTM									Ret	DNS																											0
	330	(United States) Austin Root	Honda									Ret	DNS																											0
	831	(Poland) Tomasz Wysocki	KTM																									Ret	DNS											0
	261	(Turkey) Murat Başterzi	KTM																																	Ret	DNS			0
	180	(United Kingdom) Josh Spinks	Yamaha			DNS	DNS																																	0
	981	(Belgium) Tim Louis	Kawasaki					DNS	DNS																															0
	878	(Italy) Stefano Pezzuto	Suzuki							DNS	DNS																													0
	228	(Mexico) Eduardo Andrade	KTM																					DNS	DNS															0
	178	(Czech Republic) Václav Kovář	KTM																									DNS	DNS											0
Pos	No.	Rider	Bike	ARG (Argentina)		GBR (United Kingdom)		NED (Netherlands)		TRE (Italy)		LOM (Italy)		POR (Portugal)		FRA (France)		RUS (Russia)		LAT (Latvia)		GER (Germany)		SMS (Indonesia)		JTG (Indonesia)		CZE (Czech Republic)		BEL (Belgium)		ITA (Italy)		SWE (Sweden)		TUR (Turkey)		CHN (China)		Points

=== Manufacturers Championship ===
Pos	Bike	ARG (Argentina)		GBR (United Kingdom)		NED (Netherlands)		TRE (Italy)		LOM (Italy)		POR (Portugal)		FRA (France)		RUS (Russia)		LAT (Latvia)		GER (Germany)		SMS (Indonesia)		JTG (Indonesia)		CZE (Czech Republic)		BEL (Belgium)		ITA (Italy)		SWE (Sweden)		TUR (Turkey)		CHN (China)		Points
1	Honda	2	2	3	1	5	2	1	1	10	2	1	1	1	1	1	1	6	1	1	1	1	2	1	1	2	2	2	2	5	2	3	1	6	3	3	4	791
2	KTM	1	1	1	2	1	1	2	2	1	1	2	2	2	7	4	4	1	8	6	5	2	3	4	6	8	8	3	1	1	1	1	2	1	1	1	1	769
3	Yamaha	3	5	2	3	3	6	3	3	6	4	3	3	2	3	2	2	2	2	2	3	3	1	2	3	1	1	1	4	2	3	2	5	4	6	4	3	729
4	Husqvarna	8	8	9	4	4	4	9	5	2	3	7	7	7	11	7	6	14	6	10	2	8	7	5	2	5	7	7	6	6	5	4	3	2	5	5	7	559
5	Kawasaki	4	6	4	7	2	5	6	8	5	7	5	4	6	4	6	5	11	9	Ret	14					12	17	21	22	8	7	8	10	15	12			367
6	Suzuki											30	25							Ret	24					25	24					25	24					0
Pos	Bike	ARG (Argentina)		GBR (United Kingdom)		NED (Netherlands)		TRE (Italy)		LOM (Italy)		POR (Portugal)		FRA (France)		RUS (Russia)		LAT (Latvia)		GER (Germany)		SMS (Indonesia)		JTG (Indonesia)		CZE (Czech Republic)		BEL (Belgium)		ITA (Italy)		SWE (Sweden)		TUR (Turkey)		CHN (China)		Points

|}

== MX2 ==
=== Entry list ===
Officially Approved Teams & Riders
Team	Constructor	No	Rider	Rounds
Team HRC	Honda	10	(Netherlands) Calvin Vlaanderen	1–6, 11–18
Rockstar Energy Husqvarna Factory Racing	Husqvarna	11	(Denmark) Mikkel Haarup	1–2, 5–6
Rockstar Energy Husqvarna Factory Racing	Husqvarna	14	(Australia) Jed Beaton	2–13
Rockstar Energy Husqvarna Factory Racing	Husqvarna	19	(Denmark) Thomas Kjær Olsen	All
Red Bull KTM Factory Racing	KTM	28	(France) Tom Vialle	All
F&H Racing Team	Kawasaki	29	(Germany) Henry Jacobi	1–16
F&H Racing Team	Kawasaki	39	(Netherlands) Roan van de Moosdijk	6, 17–18
F&H Racing Team	Kawasaki	811	(United Kingdom) Adam Sterry	All
Team Honda Redmoto Assomotor	Honda	32	(Belgium) Brent Van Doninck	1–17
Team Honda Redmoto Assomotor	Honda	118	(France) Stephen Rubini	5–6
Team Honda Redmoto Assomotor	Honda	172	(France) Mathys Boisramé	1–17
BUD Racing Kawasaki	Kawasaki	35	(United States) Mitchell Harrison	4–18
BUD Racing Kawasaki	Kawasaki	81	(Germany) Brian Hsu	
BUD Racing Kawasaki	Kawasaki	225	(France) Brian Moreau	1, 4–18
Honda 114 Motorsports	Honda	43	(Australia) Mitchell Evans	1–11, 13, 15–18
Honda 114 Motorsports	Honda	101	(France) Zachary Pichon	1–13, 15–18
Honda 114 Motorsports	Honda	271	(Netherlands) Koen Gouwenberg	14
KTM Racestore MX2 Max Bart	KTM	44	(Italy) Morgan Lesiardo	2–7, 9–10, 13–16
Team Diga-Procross Husqvarna	Husqvarna	46	(Netherlands) Davy Pootjes	1–9, 13
Team Diga-Procross Husqvarna	Husqvarna	104	(Germany) Jeremy Sydow	13, 15
Team Diga-Procross Husqvarna	Husqvarna	368	(Sweden) Filip Olsson	13, 15
Vamo Racing Team	KTM	50	(Bulgaria) Hakan Halmi	2
Revo Husqvarna UK	Husqvarna	53	(New Zealand) Dylan Walsh	1–10, 13–16
Revo Husqvarna UK	Husqvarna	161	(Sweden) Alvin Östlund	1–10, 13–17
Bike-It DRT Kawasaki	Kawasaki	56	(Brazil) Gustavo Pessoa	1–10, 13–17
Bike-It DRT Kawasaki	Kawasaki	57	(United States) Darian Sanayei	1–10, 13–17
Red Bull KTM De Carli Factory Racing	KTM	61	(Spain) Jorge Prado	1, 3–18
Marchetti Racing Team KTM	KTM	66	(Spain) Iker Larrañaga	1, 4–6, 8–18
Marchetti Racing Team KTM	KTM	240	(Norway) Kevin Horgmo	17
Marchetti Racing Team KTM	KTM	931	(San Marino) Andrea Zanotti	2–7, 16
I-Fly JK Racing Yamaha	Yamaha	67	(United Kingdom) Tom Grimshaw	14–15
I-Fly JK Racing Yamaha	Yamaha	97	(Bulgaria) Michael Ivanov	13
I-Fly JK Racing Yamaha	Yamaha	142	(Finland) Jere Haavisto	8–10, 13
I-Fly JK Racing Yamaha	Yamaha	184	(France) Natanael Bres	2–6
I-Fly JK Racing Yamaha	Yamaha	381	(Hungary) Ádám Zsolt Kovács	9
Yamaha SM Action - MC Migliori	Yamaha	80	(Italy) Andrea Adamo	11, 15
Yamaha SM Action - MC Migliori	Yamaha	747	(Italy) Michele Cervellin	1–10
Yamaha SM Action - MC Migliori	Yamaha	959	(France) Maxime Renaux	All
Hitachi KTM fuelled by Milwaukee	KTM	98	(Netherlands) Bas Vaessen	1–12
Hitachi KTM fuelled by Milwaukee	KTM	141	(United Kingdom) Alexander Brown	6–7
Hitachi KTM fuelled by Milwaukee	KTM	426	(United Kingdom) Conrad Mewse	1–4
Hitachi KTM fuelled by Milwaukee	KTM	766	(Austria) Michael Sandner	14–16
JD Gunnex KTM Racing Team	KTM	102	(Slovakia) Richard Šikyňa	All
JD Gunnex KTM Racing Team	KTM	313	(Czech Republic) Petr Polák	2–10, 13–17
A1M Husqvarna	Husqvarna	105	(Belgium) Cyril Genot	9–10, 13–16
A1M Husqvarna	Husqvarna	109	(Austria) Roland Edelbacher	2
Monster Energy Kemea Yamaha MX2	Yamaha	193	(Belgium) Jago Geerts	All
Monster Energy Kemea Yamaha MX2	Yamaha	919	(United Kingdom) Ben Watson	1–11, 14–15
E2T - Racing Team	Husqvarna	282	(Sweden) Hampus Kahrle	2–9
E2T - Racing Team	Husqvarna	783	(France) Enzo Toriani	2–10, 13–16
STC Racing iXS	Husqvarna	331	(Switzerland) Loris Freidig	2–7, 10, 13–14, 16
Team Gebben Van Venrooy Kawasaki Racing	Kawasaki	332	(Netherlands) Marcel Conijn	2–5, 13–17
GT243	Honda	731	(Slovenia) Maks Mausser	
Wild Card Teams & Riders
Team	Constructor	No	Rider	Rounds
	Honda	42	(China) Yongming Peng	18
TMX Compétition Yamaha	Yamaha	51	(France) Adrien Malaval	7
Sixty Seven Racing Team	Husqvarna	52	(Germany) Martin Winter	10
	Yamaha	58	(Turkey) Mustafa Çetin	17
WZ Racing Team	KTM	75	(Estonia) Hardi Roosiorg	2–10, 13–14
	Kawasaki	85	(Argentina) Agustín Carrasco	1
WPM KTM	KTM	88	(Netherlands) Freek van der Vlist	2–3, 9
	KTM	112	(Turkey) Emircan Şenkalaycı	17
Team Motormix Husqvarna	Husqvarna	117	(Italy) Alessandro Manucci	15
Team Maddii Racing Husqvarna	Husqvarna	121	(Italy) Mattia Guadagnini	17–18
Team Maddii Racing Husqvarna	Husqvarna	303	(Italy) Alberto Forato	3, 5, 17–18
HT Group Racing Team	KTM	124	(Czech Republic) Jakub Terešák	4, 13
André Motors	KTM	130	(Netherlands) René de Jong	2, 7
MX Cordoba	Husqvarna	133	(Argentina) Luciano Righi	1
GugaMX	Suzuki	144	(Portugal) Diogo Graça	6
Reinaudo Team	KTM	155	(Argentina) Nicolás Mana	1
	Yamaha	181	(China) Pu Yang	18
Team Griekspoor	KTM	199	(Netherlands) Lars Griekspoor	3, 10, 14
Martin Racing Technology	Honda	200	(Italy) Filippo Zonta	4
	Husqvarna	206	(Indonesia) Diva Ismayana	12
Team Steels Dr Jack	KTM	211	(Italy) Nicholas Lapucci	15–16
Team Steels Dr Jack	KTM	485	(Finland) Kim Savaste	7, 9, 15
GPR Promo MX Team	Husqvarna	218	(Netherlands) Joel van Mechelen	14
GPR Promo MX Team	Husqvarna	484	(United Kingdom) James Carpenter	14, 16
Creymert KTM	KTM	240	(Norway) Kevin Horgmo	13, 16
Yamaha Delta Team Krško JP 253	Yamaha	253	(Slovenia) Jan Pancar	2–4, 7, 9–10, 13–17
Freytes Motosport	Honda	265	(Argentina) Gonzalo Díaz Vélez	1
Beddini Mototechnica	Husqvarna	275	(Italy) Joakin Furbetta	2–6, 10, 13–15
Honda Motos Chile Racing	Honda	276	(Chile) Sergio Villaronga	1
920 Fly Group	Husqvarna	292	(Spain) Alex Gamboa	2
Astra Honda Racing Team	Honda	325	(Indonesia) Delvintor Alfarizi	11–12
Hutten Metaal Yamaha Racing	Yamaha	410	(Netherlands) Raivo Dankers	3, 17
Team Bratschi Repuestos	Husqvarna	422	(Uruguay) Germán Bratschi	1
MXFontaRacing Syneco	Yamaha	423	(Germany) Larissa Papenmeier	18
	Yamaha	519	(China) Ke Wang	18
	Honda	535	(China) Hao Cheng	18
Pol Motors Husqvarna	Husqvarna	651	(Canada) Kade Tinkler-Walker	3, 14
Plaza Bikes Tavomotos	Husqvarna	707	(Argentina) Mateo Bearzi	1
KINI KTM Junior Pro Team	KTM	711	(Austria) Rene Hofer	5, 13, 15
Thermotec Racing Kini KTM	KTM	766	(Austria) Michael Sandner	2–7, 9–10, 13
North Europe Racing KTM	KTM	818	(France) Jérémy Hauquier	7, 14
BUKSA/ADOS KTM Team	KTM	877	(Czech Republic) Martin Krč	13
	Honda	909	(China) Hu Bolin	18
Honda Racing Brazil	Honda	934	(Brazil) Lucas Dunka	1
Honda Racing Brazil	Honda	945	(Brazil) Leonardo de Souza	1

=== Riders Championship ===
Pos	No.	Rider	Bike	ARG (Argentina)		GBR (United Kingdom)		NED (Netherlands)		TRE (Italy)		LOM (Italy)		POR (Portugal)		FRA (France)		RUS (Russia)		LAT (Latvia)		GER (Germany)		SMS (Indonesia)		JTG (Indonesia)		CZE (Czech Republic)		BEL (Belgium)		ITA (Italy)		SWE (Sweden)		TUR (Turkey)		CHN (China)		Points
1	61	(Spain) Jorge Prado	KTM	1	1			1	1	1	1	1	1	1	1	2	1	1	1	1	1	1	1	1	2	1	1	1	1	1	1	1	1	1	4	1	1	1	1	837
2	19	(Denmark) Thomas Kjær Olsen	Husqvarna	2	2	1	1	2	3	5	4	6	2	2	4	3	5	2	2	3	3	4	4	6	1	3	18	3	4	Ret	5	2	2	8	6	Ret	DNS	5	5	624
3	193	(Belgium) Jago Geerts	Yamaha	11	6	16	6	7	2	2	2	2	18	3	Ret	1	2	3	3	2	2	9	Ret	18	4	10	6	5	6	2	Ret	4	5	14	8	2	5	4	3	543
4	28	(France) Tom Vialle	KTM	7	8	3	4	8	13	3	6	23	3	6	13	4	28	4	5	7	9	2	3	2	3	2	4	Ret	7	4	4	Ret	Ret	2	2	8	2	3	2	537
5	29	(Germany) Henry Jacobi	Kawasaki	3	5	2	3	3	6	4	5	11	Ret	7	2	8	17	8	8	Ret	6	3	9	10	8	7	7	2	3	8	12	13	6	3	Ret					442
6	811	(United Kingdom) Adam Sterry	Kawasaki	8	9	11	15	11	9	8	8	12	14	8	12	6	6	14	16	15	5	18	11	13	9	9	15	6	2	3	6	15	Ret	5	3	7	7	8	8	410
7	959	(France) Maxime Renaux	Yamaha	Ret	20	31	18	9	12	13	16	Ret	8	9	9	Ret	9	7	9	5	8	19	7	3	7	8	2	15	12	6	7	3	4	6	5	4	4	6	7	405
8	10	(Netherlands) Calvin Vlaanderen	Honda	4	4	8	2	4	4	DNS	DNS	17	10											4	13	5	3	9	5	7	2	8	3	4	1	3	6	2	4	399
9	172	(France) Mathys Boisramé	Honda	22	15	18	11	16	16	15	14	15	7	5	Ret	9	Ret	11	12	Ret	15	7	2	9	15	6	8	11	8	14	15	5	15	7	12	6	11			303
10	919	(United Kingdom) Ben Watson	Kawasaki	6	7	4	5	5	5	7	3	13	13	18	14	12	3	10	6	4	4	DNS	DNS	DNS	DNS					5	3	DNS	DNS							282
11	43	(Australia) Mitchell Evans	Honda	5	3	34	8	37	10	6	7	8	6	4	3	7	4	5	10	9	22	Ret	DNS	19	DNS			DNS	DNS			23	24	11	7	14	9	Ret	13	279
12	14	(Australia) Jed Beaton	Husqvarna			9	13	10	15	12	13	3	17	12	Ret	DNS	DNS	12	7	10	13	6	5	5	5	4	11	4	9											250
13	66	(Spain) Iker Larrañaga	KTM	Ret	DNS					11	18	7	9	Ret	DNS			23	11	14	16	13	13	12	12	15	9	7	16	16	14	7	7	13	Ret	12	16	7	9	220
14	98	(Netherlands) Bas Vaessen	KTM	14	13	13	12	15	8	10	11	5	15	10	Ret	15	7	Ret	Ret	6	7	5	6	7	11	13	19													219
15	35	(United States) Mitchell Harrison	Kawasaki							22	17	26	24	13	11	21	14	18	19	12	12	8	10	16	10	12	10	12	Ret	12	13	20	17	15	10	13	Ret	11	11	188
16	747	(Italy) Michele Cervellin	Yamaha	18	11	5	9	17	14	9	12	Ret	16	Ret	7	Ret	11	9	4	8	10	11	8																	179
17	32	(Belgium) Brent Van Doninck	Honda	17	17	DNS	DNS	18	11	14	9	Ret	Ret	22	6	23	22	13	14	20	11	10	Ret	8	6	11	5	10	13	DNS	DNS	Ret	DNS	17	18	Ret	DNS			172
18	161	(Sweden) Alvin Östlund	Husqvarna	15	14	15	14	13	20	18	15	21	11	17	16	16	18	15	17	11	14	15	25					19	18	9	11	12	9	18	16	16	15			171
19	46	(Netherlands) Davy Pootjes	Husqvarna	10	10	7	7	6	Ret	Ret	10	4	4	16	10	5	8	Ret	23	Ret	DNS							DNS	DNS											157
20	102	(Slovakia) Richard Šikyňa	KTM	19	21	19	17	20	18	25	20	10	19	21	23	17	16	16	15	18	23	Ret	16	15	14	14	13	16	14	17	Ret	Ret	14	21	15	10	13	13	15	144
21	57	(United States) Darian Sanayei	Kawasaki	12	Ret	Ret	19	14	19	Ret	Ret	Ret	21	Ret	8	10	13	6	18	17	Ret	16	Ret					29	Ret	10	17	Ret	8	9	11	17	14			140
22	53	(New Zealand) Dylan Walsh	Husqvarna	13	18	10	10	DNS	DNS	21	23	19	5	23	Ret	13	Ret	17	13	13	19	14	14					Ret	15	DNS	DNS	17	12	10	9					137
23	225	(France) Brian Moreau	Kawasaki	DNS	DNS					19	Ret	14	23	11	15	Ret	10	19	20	23	17	Ret	Ret	11	16	19	17	8	17	Ret	8	Ret	22	12	24	15	18	9	Ret	124
24	101	(France) Zachary Pichon	Honda	21	19	17	Ret	33	Ret	20	21	DNS	DNS	25	21	11	15	Ret	24	Ret	DNS	17	15	14	18	16	12	18	Ret			16	Ret	16	13	18	12	14	14	104
25	44	(Italy) Morgan Lesiardo	KTM			22	24	21	27	Ret	22	9	Ret	19	18	14	19			16	18	12	12					24	Ret	13	10	9	13	22	Ret					91
26	39	(Netherlands) Roan van de Moosdijk	Kawasaki											14	5																					5	3	Ret	6	74
27	303	(Italy) Alberto Forato	Husqvarna					12	7			Ret	Ret																							9	8	12	10	68
28	253	(Slovenia) Jan Pancar	Yamaha			24	23	31	31	31	28					20	12			Ret	27	22	18					17	19	Ret	18	10	20	20	14	20	17			47
29	711	(Austria) Rene Hofer	KTM									Ret	DNS															14	11			6	11							42
30	121	(Italy) Mattia Guadagnini	Husqvarna																																	11	10	10	12	41
31	426	(United Kingdom) Conrad Mewse	KTM	9	12	6	Ret	Ret	Ret	17	27																													40
32	766	(Austria) Michael Sandner	KTM			12	16	32	22	23	19	20	Ret	Ret	DNS	Ret	Ret			21	Ret	23	20					26	26	15	16	19	Ret	24	23					31
33	56	(Brazil) Gustavo Pessoa	Kawasaki	16	16	14	25	24	25	26	26	Ret	26	20	Ret	19	21	21	Ret	Ret	25	21	Ret					21	27	22	19	22	19	29	DNS	21	Ret			24
34	105	(Belgium) Cyril Genot	Husqvarna																	Ret	20	25	21					23	30	11	9	21	21	23	21					23
35	240	(Norway) Kevin Horgmo	KTM																									13	10					19	22	19	21			23
36	211	(Italy) Nicholas Lapucci	KTM																													11	16	26	17					19
37	325	(Indonesia) Delvintor Alfarizi	Honda																					17	17	17	14													19
38	931	(San Marino) Andrea Zanotti	KTM			28	28	27	17	Ret	Ret	Ret	20	15	17	DNS	DNS																	Ret	Ret					15
39	104	(Germany) Jeremy Sydow	Husqvarna																									DNS	DNS			18	10							14
40	75	(Estonia) Hardi Roosiorg	KTM			26	26	19	21	24	30	18	22	27	19	28	23	20	Ret	19	21	20	19					20	Ret	DNS	DNS									14
41	313	(Czech Republic) Petr Polák	KTM			23	20	26	28	28	24	24	Ret	Ret	Ret	DNS	DNS	25	21	22	24	26	23					22	20	18	Ret	Ret	18	27	19	22	19			12
42	423	(Germany) Larissa Papenmeier	Yamaha																																			15	16	11
43	11	(Denmark) Mikkel Haarup	Husqvarna	20	22	Ret	DNS					Ret	12	DNS	DNS																									10
44	519	(China) Ke Wang	Yamaha																																			15	16	9
45	206	(Indonesia) Diva Ismayana	Kawasaki																							18	16													8
46	80	(Italy) Andrea Adamo	Yamaha																					DNS	DNS							14	25							7
47	181	(China) Pu Yang	Yamaha																																			17	18	7
48	275	(Italy) Joakin Furbetta	Husqvarna			20	29	23	Ret	Ret	25	16	Ret	29	26							29	Ret					30	29	21	Ret	DNS	DNS							6
49	200	(Italy) Filippo Zonta	Honda							16	Ret																													5
50	142	(Finland) Jere Haavisto	Yamaha															Ret	Ret	25	Ret	30	17					DNS	DNS											4
51	783	(France) Enzo Toriani	Husqvarna			32	22	35	29	29	29	27	25	32	25	18	26	22	22	24	26	24	22					25	24	Ret	Ret	25	23	25	20					4
52	42	(China) Yongming Peng	Honda																																			18	20	4
53	909	(China) Hu Bolin	Honda																																			19	19	4
54	332	(Netherlands) Marcel Conijn	Kawasaki			29	32	30	30	33	32	22	27															31	28	19	25	27	Ret	30	26	23	22			2
55	410	(Netherlands) Raivo Dankers	Yamaha					22	24																											24	20			1
56	199	(Netherlands) Lars Griekspoor	Husqvarna					Ret	DNS													31	Ret							20	22									1
57	535	(China) Hao Cheng	Honda																																			20	Ret	1
58	141	(United Kingdom) Alexander Brown	KTM											24	20	DNS	DNS																							1
59	484	(United Kingdom) James Carpenter	Husqvarna																											Ret	20			28	25					1
60	485	(Finland) Kim Savaste	KTM													29	20			DNS	DNS											DNS	DNS							1
	331	(Switzerland) Loris Freidig	Yamaha			30	31	36	32	32	33	28	DNS	28	24	24	25					27	24					Ret	25	27	21			DNS	DNS					0
	88	(Netherlands) Freek van der Vlist	KTM			27	21	28	Ret											DNS	DNS																			0
	124	(Czech Republic) Jakub Terešák	KTM							27	31																	27	21											0
	184	(France) Natanael Bres	Yamaha			21	Ret	29	Ret	Ret	Ret	Ret	Ret	31	Ret																									0
	282	(Sweden) Hampus Kahrle	Husqvarna			Ret	27	34	26	30	Ret	25	Ret	26	22	25	27	24	Ret	Ret	DNS																			0
	368	(Sweden) Filip Olsson	Husqvarna																									Ret	22			24	Ret							0
	818	(France) Jérémy Hauquier	KTM													30	31													23	23									0
	276	(Chile) Sergio Villaronga	Honda	23	23																																			0
	651	(Canada) Kade Tinkler-Walker	Husqvarna					25	23																					Ret	28									0
	877	(Czech Republic) Martin Krč	KTM																									28	23											0
	945	(Brazil) Leonardo De Souza	Honda	24	24																																			0
	130	(Netherlands) René de Jong	KTM			25	30									26	24																							0
	271	(Netherlands) Koen Gouwenberg	Honda																											25	24									0
	218	(Netherlands) Joel van Mechelen	Husqvarna																											24	27									0
	155	(Argentina) Nicolás Mana	KTM	26	25																																			0
	934	(Brazil) Lucas Dunka	Honda	25	Ret																																			0
	52	(Germany) Martin Winter	Husqvarna																			28	26																	0
	707	(Argentina) Mateo Bearzi	Husqvarna	29	26																																			0
	381	(Hungary) Adam Zsolt Kovacs	Yamaha																	26	Ret																			0
	117	(Italy) Alessandro Manucci	Husqvarna																													26	Ret							0
	265	(Argentina) Gonzalo Díaz Vélez	Honda	28	27																																			0
	51	(France) Adrien Malaval	Husqvarna													27	29																							0
	144	(Portugal) Diogo Graça	Suzuki											30	27																									0
	422	(Uruguay) Germán Bratschi	Husqvarna	27	Ret																																			0
	67	(United Kingdom) Tom Grimshaw	Yamaha																											28	Ret	Ret	DNS							0
	292	(Spain) Alex Gamboa	Husqvarna			33	DNS																																	0
	118	(France) Stephen Rubini	Honda									Ret	Ret	DNS	DNS																									0
	133	(Argentina) Luciano Righi	Husqvarna	Ret	DNS																																			0
	50	(Bulgaria) Hakan Halmi	KTM			Ret	DNS																																	0
	58	(Turkey) Musafa Çetin	Yamaha																																	Ret	DNS			0
	112	(Turkey) Emircan Şenkalayci	KTM																																	Ret	DNS			0
	85	(Argentina) Agustín Carrasco	Husqvarna	DNS	DNS																																			0
	109	(Austria) Roland Edelbacher	Husqvarna			DNS	DNS																																	0
	97	(Bulgaria) Michael Ivanov	Yamaha																									DNS	DNS											0
Pos	No.	Rider	Bike	ARG (Argentina)		GBR (United Kingdom)		NED (Netherlands)		TRE (Italy)		LOM (Italy)		POR (Portugal)		FRA (France)		RUS (Russia)		LAT (Latvia)		GER (Germany)		SMS (Indonesia)		JTG (Indonesia)		CZE (Czech Republic)		BEL (Belgium)		ITA (Italy)		SWE (Sweden)		TUR (Turkey)		CHN (China)		Points

=== Manufacturers Championship ===
Pos	Bike	ARG (Argentina)		GBR (United Kingdom)		NED (Netherlands)		TRE (Italy)		LOM (Italy)		POR (Portugal)		FRA (France)		RUS (Russia)		LAT (Latvia)		GER (Germany)		SMS (Indonesia)		JTG (Indonesia)		CZE (Czech Republic)		BEL (Belgium)		ITA (Italy)		SWE (Sweden)		TUR (Turkey)		CHN (China)		Points
1	KTM	1	1	3	4	1	1	1	1	1	1	1	1	2	1	1	1	1	1	1	1	1	2	1	1	1	1	1	1	1	1	1	2	1	1	1	1	879
2	Husqvarna	2	2	1	1	2	3	5	4	3	2	2	4	3	5	2	2	3	3	4	4	5	1	3	11	3	4	9	5	2	2	8	6	9	8	5	5	674
3	Yamaha	6	6	4	5	5	2	2	2	2	8	3	7	1	2	3	3	2	2	9	7	3	4	8	2	5	6	2	3	3	4	6	5	2	4	4	3	665
4	Honda	4	3	8	2	4	4	6	7	8	6	4	3	7	4	5	10	9	11	7	2	4	6	5	3	9	5	7	2	5	3	4	1	3	6	2	4	608
5	Kawasaki	3	5	2	3	3	6	4	5	11	14	7	2	6	6	6	8	12	5	3	9	10	8	7	7	2	2	3	6	13	6	3	3	5	3	8	6	573
6	Suzuki											30	27																									0
Pos	Bike	ARG (Argentina)		GBR (United Kingdom)		NED (Netherlands)		TRE (Italy)		LOM (Italy)		POR (Portugal)		FRA (France)		RUS (Russia)		LAT (Latvia)		GER (Germany)		SMS (Indonesia)		JTG (Indonesia)		CZE (Czech Republic)		BEL (Belgium)		ITA (Italy)		SWE (Sweden)		TUR (Turkey)		CHN (China)		Points

|}
