= Dornstedt =

- Ortsteil of Teutschenthal
- Interactive map of Dornstedt
- Location within Germany Location within Saxony-Anhalt
- Coordinates: 51°25′N 11°45′E
- Country: Germany
- State: Saxony-Anhalt
- District: Saalekreis
- Municipality: Teutschenthal

Area
  - Total: 10.41 km^{2} (4.02 sq mi)
- Elevation: 139 m (456 ft)

Population (2006-12-31)
  - Total: 752
  - Density: 72.2/km^{2} (187/sq mi)
- Time zone: UTC+01:00 (CET)
  - Summer (DST): UTC+02:00 (CEST)
- Postal codes: 06179
- Dialling codes: 034636
- Website: www.dornstedt.de

Dornstedt is a village and a former municipality in the district Saalekreis, in Saxony-Anhalt, Germany.

Since 1 January 2010, it is part of the municipality Teutschenthal.
