= Angersdorf =

- Ortsteil of Teutschenthal
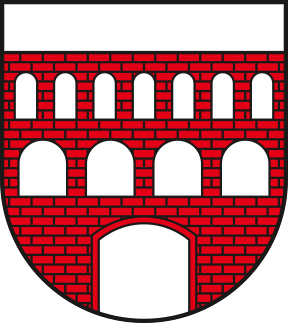
- Coat of arms
- Interactive map of Angersdorf
- Location within Germany Location within Saxony-Anhalt
- Coordinates: 51°28′N 11°55′E
- Country: Germany
- State: Saxony-Anhalt
- District: Saalekreis
- Municipality: Teutschenthal

Area
  - Total: 6.37 km^{2} (2.46 sq mi)
- Elevation: 75 m (246 ft)

Population (2009-12-31)
  - Total: 1,162
  - Density: 182/km^{2} (472/sq mi)
- Time zone: UTC+01:00 (CET)
  - Summer (DST): UTC+02:00 (CEST)
- Postal codes: 06179
- Dialling codes: 0345
- Vehicle registration: SK
- Website: www.gemeinde-angersdorf.de

Angersdorf is a village and a former municipality in the Saalekreis district, Saxony-Anhalt, Germany. Since 1 September 2010, it is part of the municipality Teutschenthal.
