= Langenbogen =

- Ortsteil of Teutschenthal
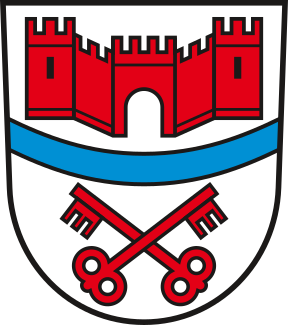
- Coat of arms
- Interactive map of Langenbogen
- Location within Germany Location within Saxony-Anhalt
- Coordinates: 51°29′N 11°47′E
- Country: Germany
- State: Saxony-Anhalt
- District: Saalekreis
- Municipality: Teutschenthal

Area
  - Total: 6.81 km^{2} (2.63 sq mi)
- Elevation: 95 m (312 ft)

Population (2006-12-31)
  - Total: 2,622
  - Density: 385/km^{2} (997/sq mi)
- Time zone: UTC+01:00 (CET)
  - Summer (DST): UTC+02:00 (CEST)
- Postal codes: 06179
- Dialling codes: 034601
- Website: www.langenbogen.de

Langenbogen is a village and a former municipality in the district Saalekreis, in Saxony-Anhalt, Germany.

Since 1 January 2010, it is part of the municipality Teutschenthal.
