= Charles Debrille Poston =

American politician (1825–1902)

Charles D. Poston
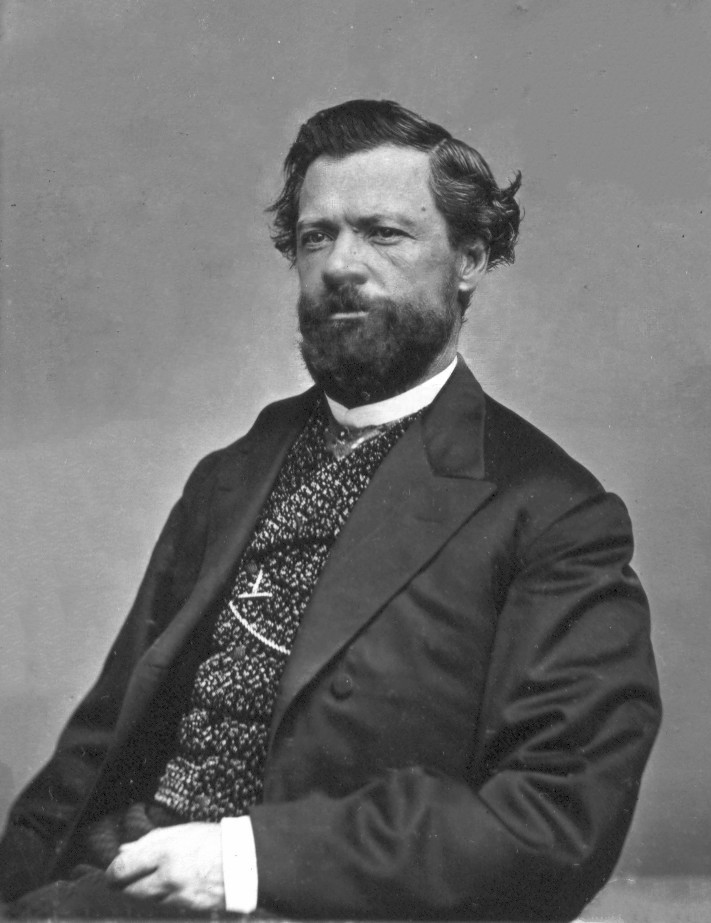

Delegate to the U.S. House of Representatives from Arizona Territory
- In office December 5, 1864 – March 3, 1865
- Preceded by: None (new territory)
- Succeeded by: John Noble Goodwin

Personal details
- Born: April 20, 1825 Elizabethtown, Kentucky, US
- Died: June 24, 1902 (aged 77) Phoenix, Arizona Territory
- Party: Republican
- Spouse(s): Margaret Haycraft (1848–1884); Martha Tucker (married 1885)

Charles Debrille Poston (April 20, 1825 – June 24, 1902) was an American explorer, prospector, author, politician, and civil servant. He is referred to as the "Father of Arizona" due to his efforts lobbying for creation of the territory. Poston was also Arizona Territory's first Delegate to the U.S. House of Representatives.

== Background ==
Poston was born near Elizabethtown, Kentucky, to Temple and Judith Debrille Poston. His father was a printer and he served as a printer's devil. Poston was orphaned at the age of twelve, and was apprenticed to the local county clerk, Samuel Haycraft. Following his apprenticeship, he moved to Nashville, Tennessee, where he clerked for the Tennessee Supreme Court while reading law. Poston married Haycraft's daughter, Margaret, in November 1849 and the couple had a daughter, Sarah Lee Poston, who reached adulthood. Charles Poston was listed in the 1850 census as owning at least one slave.

Margaret Poston became paralyzed on February 12, 1851, possibly from a stroke while giving birth to a second child, and was cared for by relatives until her death from cancer on February 26, 1884. On July 27, 1885, Poston married former newspaper typesetter Martha "Mattie" Tucker. The couple separated shortly afterwards, but there is no evidence they ever divorced.

== Early exploration and mining efforts ==
Poston traveled to California as part of the Gold Rush and took a clerk position at the San Francisco Customs House in February 1851. Poston was demoted in 1853 and complained that his replacement was a professional gambler and political appointee. While at this job, he became involved with a group of French bankers interested in the lands of the recently negotiated Gadsden Purchase. In late 1853, with the bankers' backing, Poston joined with mining engineer Herman Ehrenberg to organize an expedition into the territory Mexico was expected to sell to the United States. Taking a ship from San Francisco, the two became shipwrecked near the Mexican port of Guaymas. They were then detained temporarily by Mexican authorities as suspected filibusters before heading north to the Gadsden territory. The expedition visited San Xavier del Bac and Ajo, collecting mineral samples along the way, before traveling down the Gila River. At Fort Yuma, a U.S. Army post near the confluence of the Gila and Colorado River, Poston first met the fort's commander Major Samuel P. Heintzelman. While at Fort Yuma Poston surveyed a townsite on the south side of the river a mile below the fort, at Jaeger's Ferry. Poston sold the townsite called Colorado City for $20,000 when he returned to San Francisco.

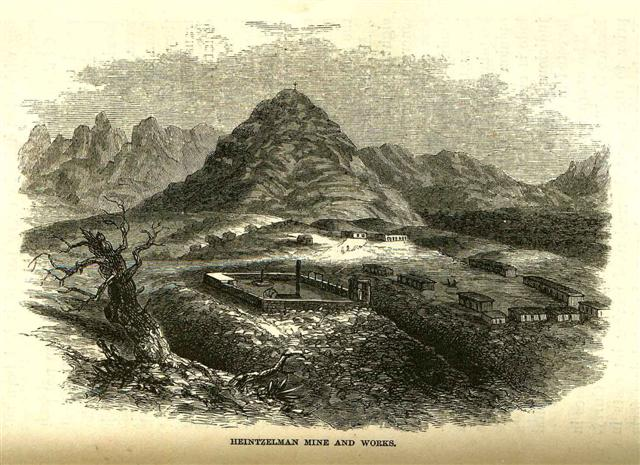
The mining town and fort of Cerro Colorado, established by Poston and Major Heintzelmen.

After returning to San Francisco, Poston left for the East Coast in search of capital to fund a mining operation in the newly acquired territory. After several unsuccessful attempts, he was introduced to several Cincinnati, Ohio, investors by Heintzelman. On March 24, 1856, US$2 million was secured to found the Sonora Exploring and Mining Company with Heintzelman as company president and Poston as managing supervisor. The company set up headquarters in Tubac, Arizona, and began mining operations in the nearby Santa Rita Mountains and elsewhere. Poston served as alcalde of the settlement and became known as "Colonel" Poston in the town of roughly 800 people. Using the authority granted to him by the government of New Mexico Territory, he printed his own money and officiated over marriages, divorces, and the baptisms of children. This continued until Father Macheboeuf, the vicar of Bishop Jean-Baptiste Lamy, was sent from Santa Fe to investigate the goings-on in Tubac. The validity of the marriages Poston had performed was questioned by the vicar, and a US$700 donation made before Father Macheboeuf sanctified the unions. Charles Poston's brother, John, was murdered by Mexican outlaws at Cerro Colorado in southern Arizona, the town was established by Charles Poston.

Mining operations produced US$3000 per day in silver until 1861. With the withdrawal of Union troops due to the American Civil War, Tubac saw an increase in hostilities from local Apaches and the settlement had to be abandoned.

== Arizona Territory ==
After being forced to leave Tubac due to the Apache siege, Poston went to Washington, D.C., and worked for General Heintzelman as a civilian aide. During this time Heintzelman introduced him to President Abraham Lincoln. Poston in turn used this time to lobby both Lincoln and Congress for creation of an Arizona Territory, advertising the benefits of the area's mineral wealth to the Union cause. Toward the end of the process Poston attended an oyster dinner where the slate of territorial positions was divided among lame duck congressmen and Poston was selected as an Indian Agent for the new territory.

Poston commissioned Tiffany & Co. to create a US$1500 inkwell from Arizona silver and presented the inkwell to Lincoln upon signing of the Arizona Organic Act. On 12 March 1863 Poston was appointed superintendent of Indian affairs. This appointment was followed by his election as Delegate to the U.S. House of Representatives on 18 July 1864. During his term of service, Poston submitted bills aimed at settling private land claims and to establish Indian reservations along the Colorado river. In 1865, Poston chose not to return to Arizona during his run for reelection, and was defeated by John Noble Goodwin. A final run for election to the territorial delegate position failed in 1866.

== Writing ==
After losing his position in Congress, Poston opened a law office in Washington D.C. In 1867 he traveled to Europe, spending time in both London and Paris. He then returned to Washington and in 1868 published a travel book, Europe in the Summer-Time. This was followed by U.S. Secretary of State William H. Seward commissioning Poston to deliver the Burlingame Treaty to the Emperor of China and to study irrigation and immigration in Asia. After China, Poston continued to India where he developed a fascination with the Parsi people and Zoroastrianism. He reached Egypt by early 1869 and was in Paris by April of that year. After living a year in Paris he moved to London where he spent the next six years. During this time he worked as an editor of a London newspaper, foreign correspondent to the New York Tribune, and as a "counselor-at-law". Poston also wrote several books during this time, publishing The Parsees in 1872, The Sun Worshippers of Asia in 1877, and his poem Apache Land in 1878. His work, Building a State in Apache Land was published in installments by Overland Monthly between July and October 1894.

== Later life ==
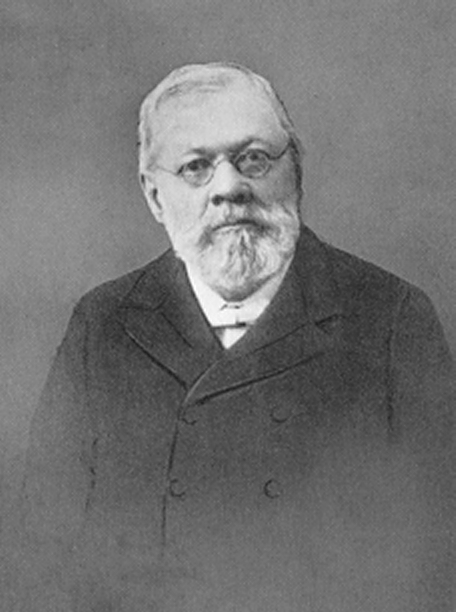
Poston in his later years

Poston returned to the United States in time for the Centennial Exposition in Philadelphia. Through his acquaintance with John Bigelow, he then became a campaign worker for Samuel J. Tilden during the U.S. presidential election of 1876. Poston expected a consul position in London if Tilden had won the election, but instead was made Registrar of the United States land office at Florence, Arizona, from July 1877 till June 1879. During his time in Florence he became interested in building a Parsi fire temple on a nearby hill, paying for construction of a road to the summit. The temple itself was decorated with a blue and white flag depicting a red sun and built upon the ruins of an older Indian structure. Construction ended when Poston ran out of funds. He attempted to raise additional money, even writing to the Shah of Iran, but his efforts failed and the temple's eternal flame failed shortly thereafter. This unusual interest led to Poston being criticized as a crank and eccentric.

Following his time in Florence he moved to Tucson and supported himself with a variety of positions including lecturer, mining and railroad promoter, and writer. In 1884 he became a consular agent in Nogales followed by an assignment as a civilian military agent in El Paso, Texas, in 1887 and as employee of U.S. Geological Survey in 1889.

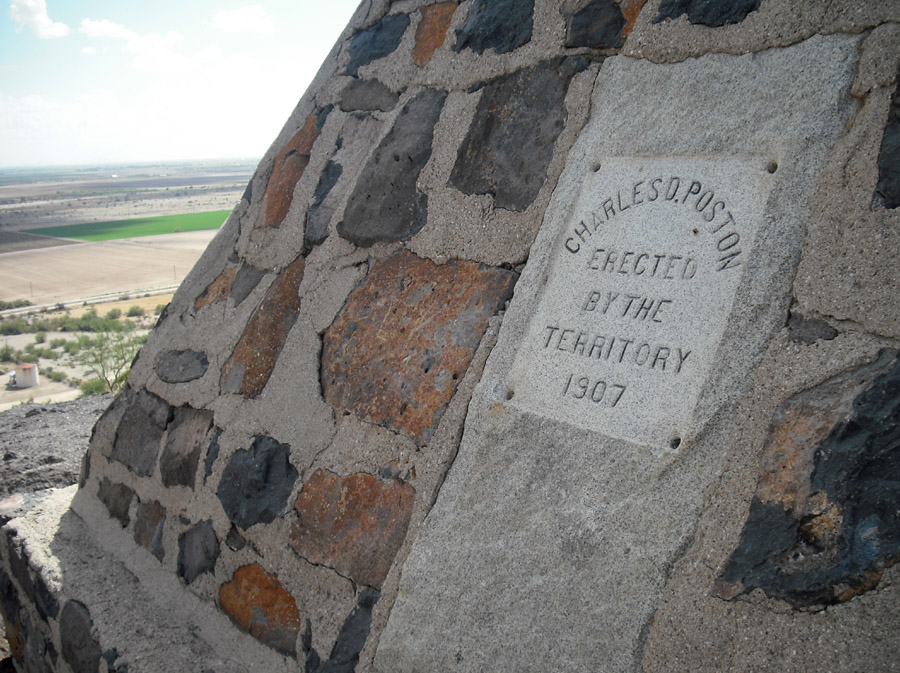
Inscription on the tomb of Charles D. Poston on Poston Butte in Florence, Arizona

Poston declined into obscurity until 1897 when Whitelaw Reid published an account detailing Poston's situation. As a result, the Arizona Territorial legislature awarded Poston a pension of US$25/month in 1899 and increased this to US$35/month in 1901. Poston died from apparent heart failure on June 24, 1902, in Phoenix, Arizona Territory.

Despite his previously stated wish to be buried at the summit of Primrose Hill, Poston was initially buried in a pauper's grave in Phoenix. His remains were removed from Phoenix and moved to Florence, Arizona, on the 100th anniversary of his birth, and buried on Primrose Hill, renamed, Poston Butte where he had never completed his "Temple to the Sun". He was entombed in an official ceremony led by Governor George W. P. Hunt.

== See also ==
- List of United States representatives from Arizona
- Hole-in-the-Rock (Papago Park)

U.S. House of Representatives
Preceded by None (new territory)	Delegate to the U.S. House of Representatives from Arizona Territory; 1864–1865	Succeeded by John Noble Goodwin
