= Hole-in-the-Rock (Papago Park) =

Geological formation in Arizona

Coordinates: 33.4565°N 111.9455°W

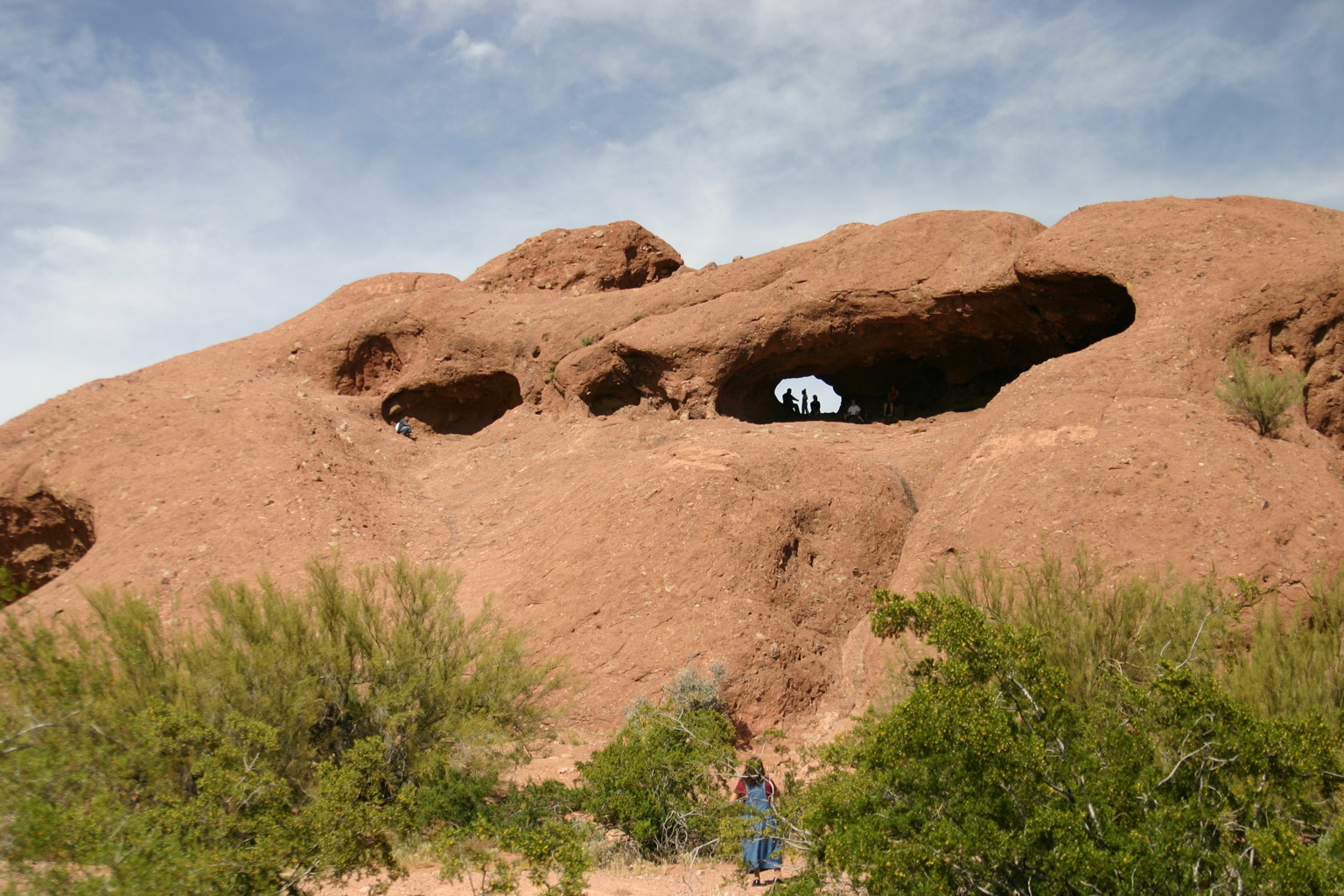
Hole-in-the-Rock, west (front) side shown

Hole-in-the-Rock is a natural geological formation in Papago Park, a municipal park of Phoenix and Tempe, Arizona.

== Description ==
In 1892, Charles Poston named and claimed "Hole-in-the-Rock".

Hole-in-the-Rock is a series of openings (tafoni) eroded in a small hill composed of bare red arkosic conglomeritic sandstone. The sandstone was first formed some 6–15 million years ago from the accumulation of materials eroding from a Precambrian granite, long since eroded away. The tafoni are thought to have been eroded by water. An open, shelter-like chamber in the face of the formation communicates with the rear of the formation via a hole eroded completely through the rock. Another substantial opening exists in the "ceiling" of the chamber.

There is evidence that the Hohokam, early inhabitants of the region, used and recorded the position of sunlight shining through the latter opening to mark the seasons—notably the equinoxes and the solstices, which were marked by carving a slick area (metate) in the rock. Other positions were marked with boulders.

The formation is a popular attraction in the park. The openings and main chamber near the summit are easily accessible via a smoothly ascending path that passes behind the hill. It is also possible to climb the face of the hill to reach the chamber. While popular, the trail can be dangerous. The chamber provides a good view of the city of Phoenix west of the park. A nearly constant wind blows through the openings in the rock.

== Gallery ==
Different views at Hole-in-the-Rock
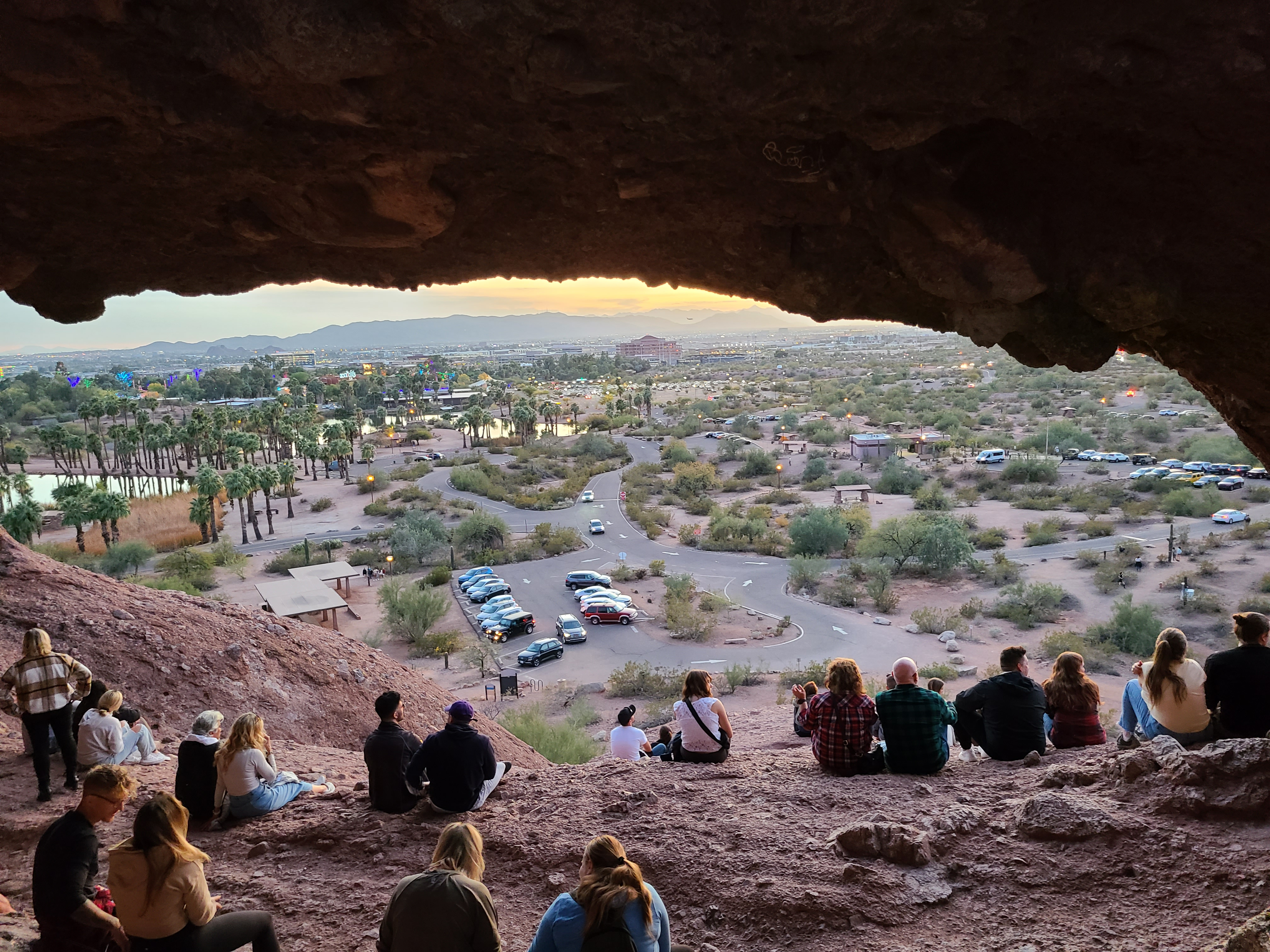
Hole-in-the-Rock is a popular natural attraction.

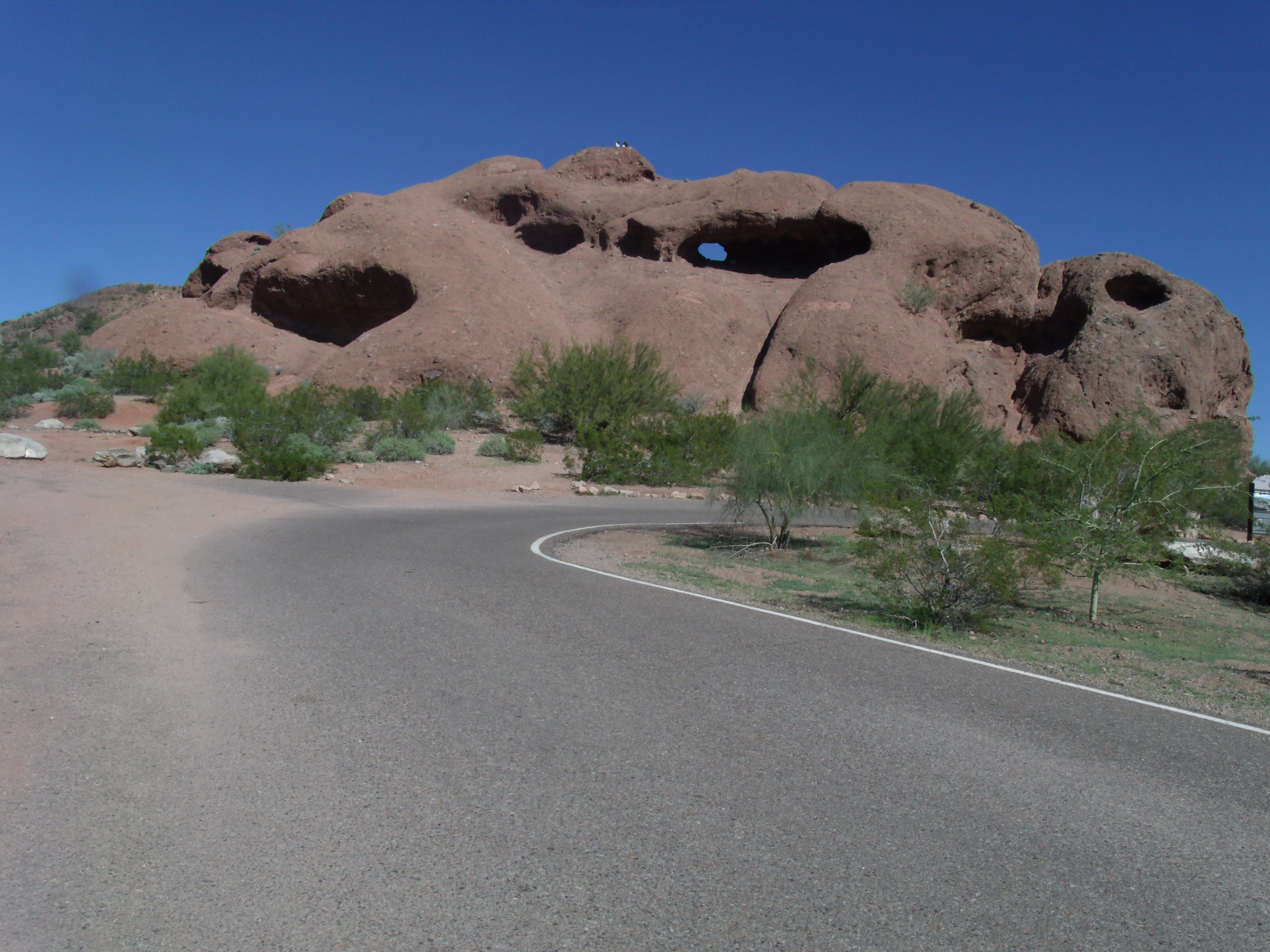
The Hole-in-the-Rock is one of Phoenix's many landmarks

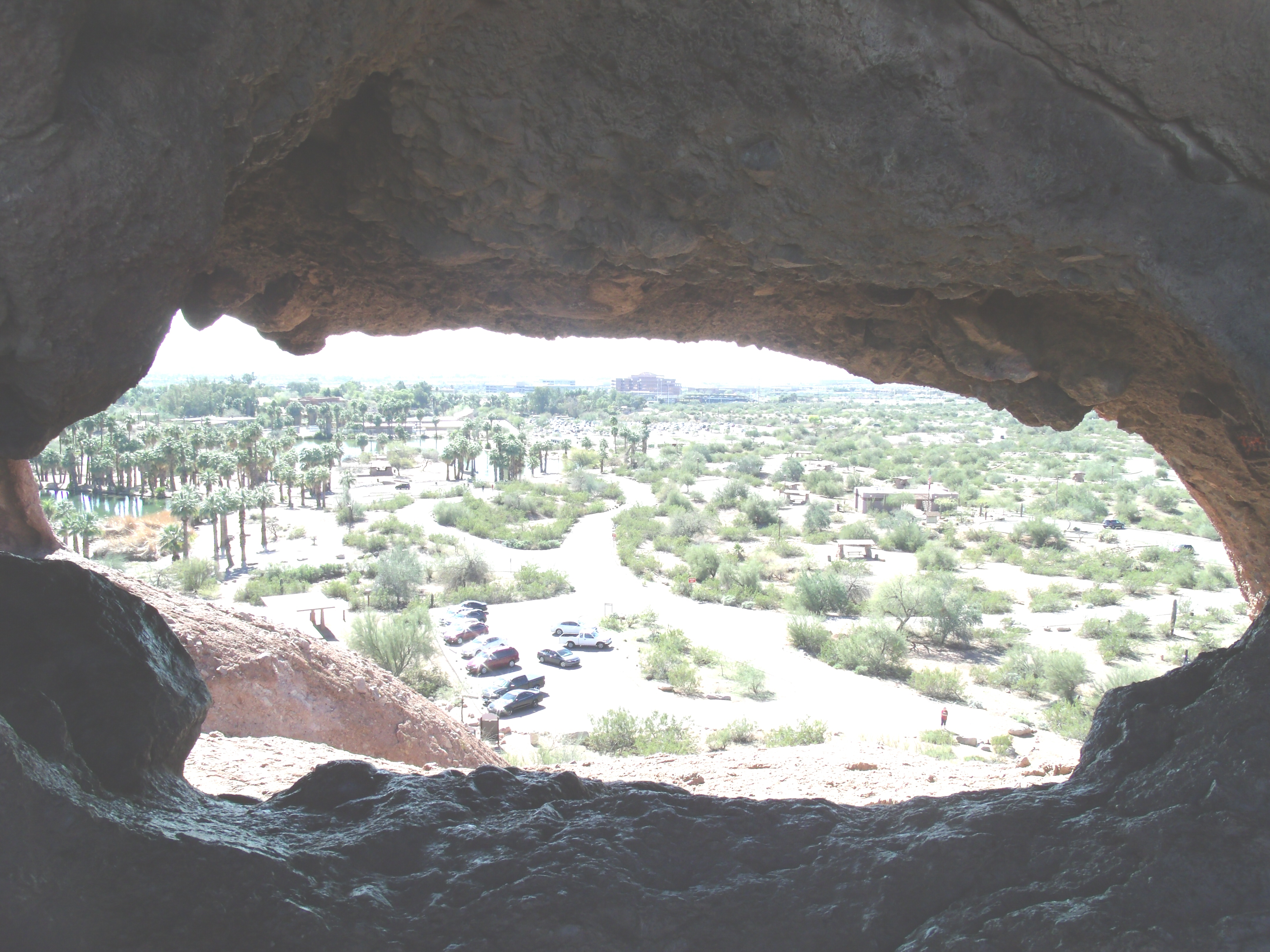
View from inside the Hole-in-the-Rock, a Phoenix landmark located in Papago Park

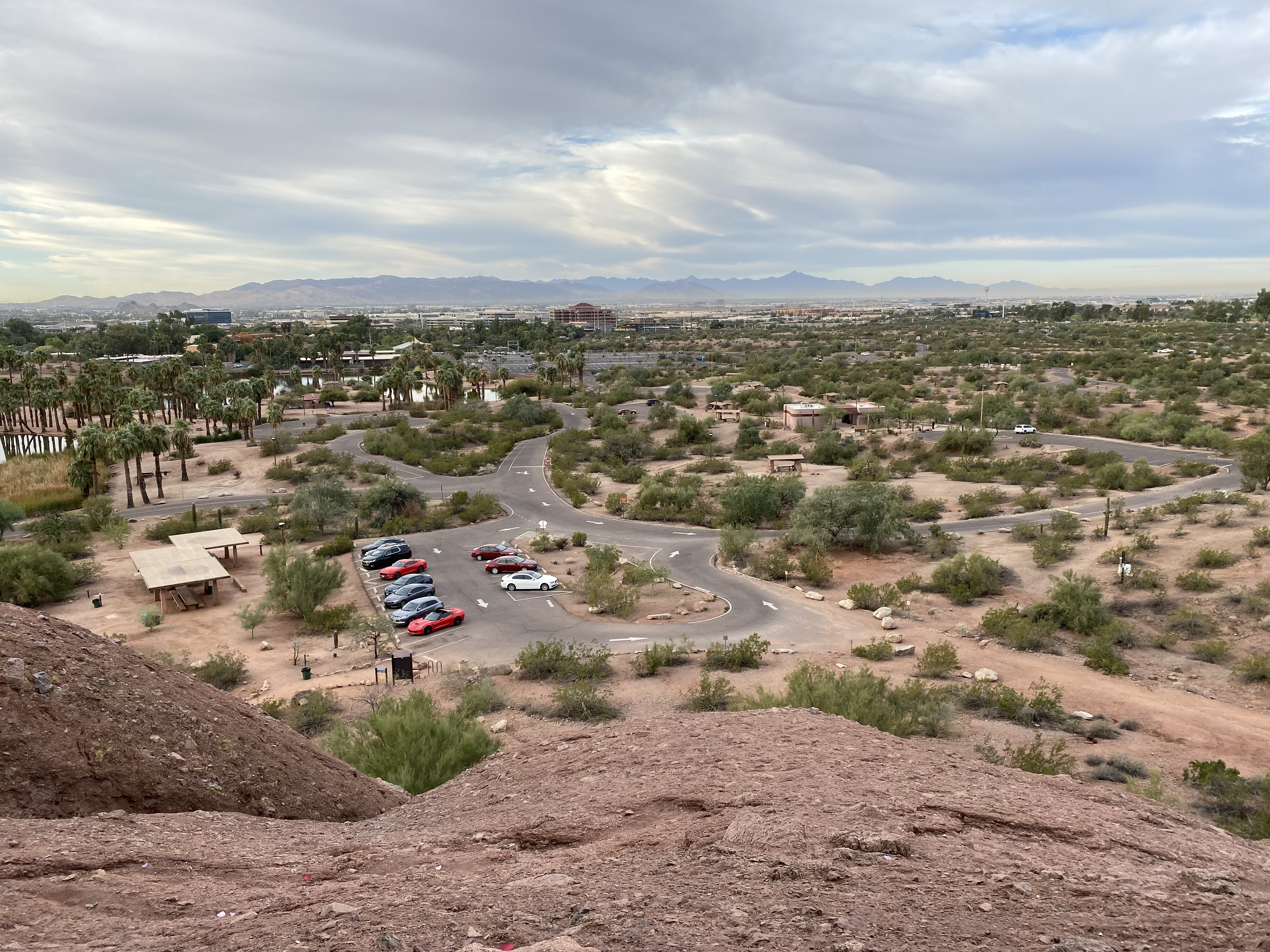
View from the top

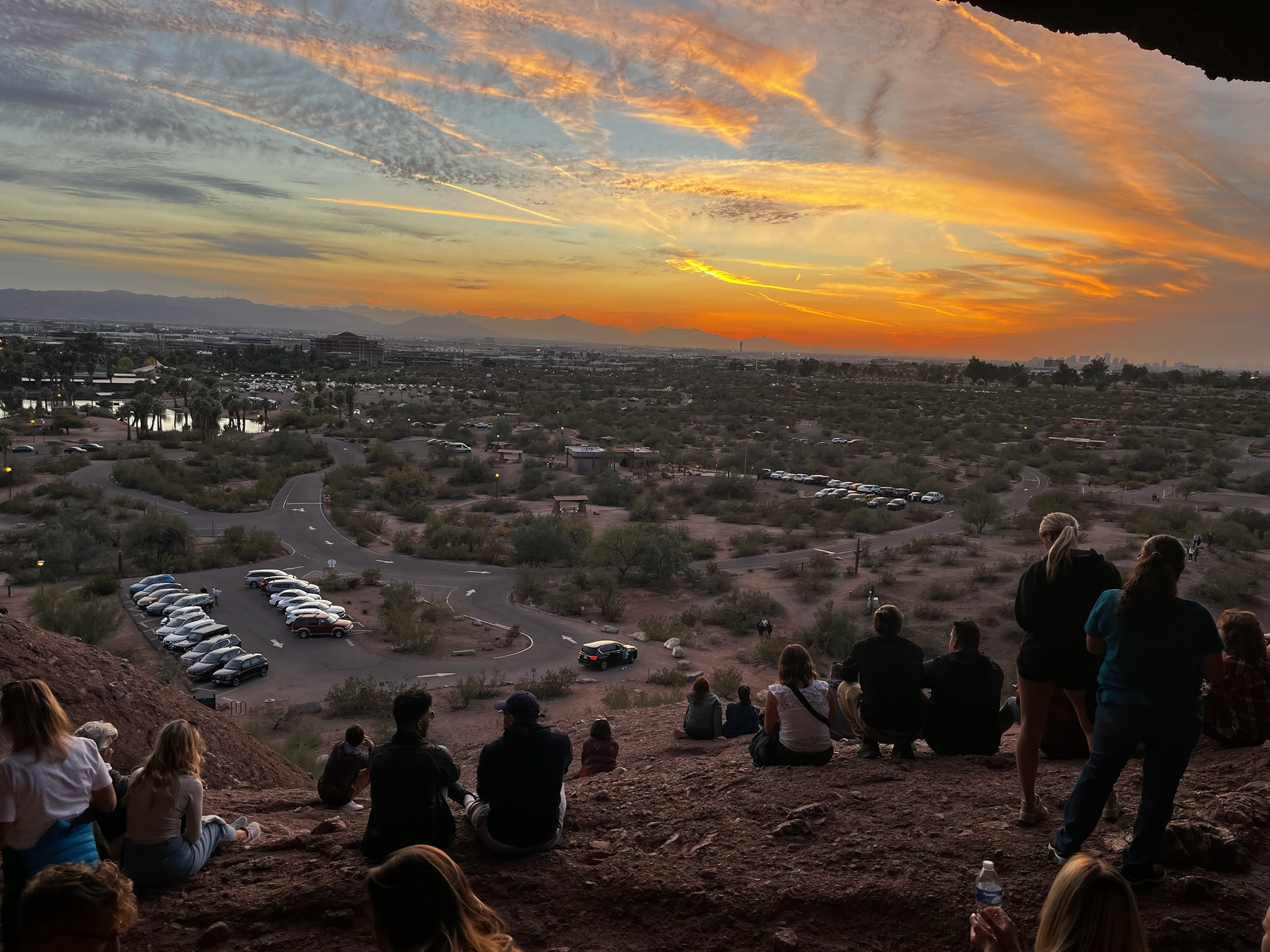
A group of people watch the sunset at Hole-in-the-Rock.

== See also ==
- List of historic properties in Phoenix, Arizona
