= Poston Butte =

Landform in Pinal County, Arizona

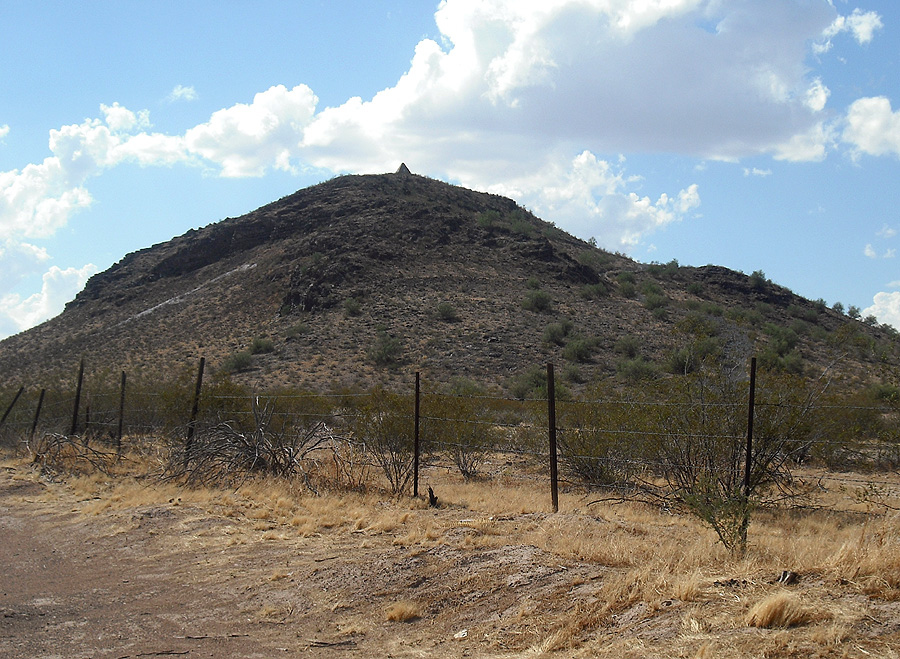
- Poston Butte, with Poston's pyramidal tomb at the peak

Highest point
- Elevation: 1,749 ft (533 m) NAVD 88
- Prominence: 223 ft (68 m)
- Coordinates: 33°03′19″N 111°24′32″W

Geography
- Location within Arizona Location within the United States
- Location: Pinal County, Arizona, U.S.
- Topo map: USGS Florence

Poston Butte, formerly called Primrose Hill, is a hill located along Hunt Highway in Florence, Pinal County, Arizona, United States, near the eastern end of the Santan Mountains. Geologically, it is characterized by basalts overlying altered granite.

This hill is noted for having the pyramidal tomb of Charles Debrille Poston at its summit. Poston lobbied President Lincoln and Congress to create the Territory of Arizona and was appointed Superintendent of Indian Affairs because of his familiarity with the Native populations of the area. The tomb can be accessed by a 0.6-mile (0.97 km) trail starting from the trailhead near Hunt Highway.

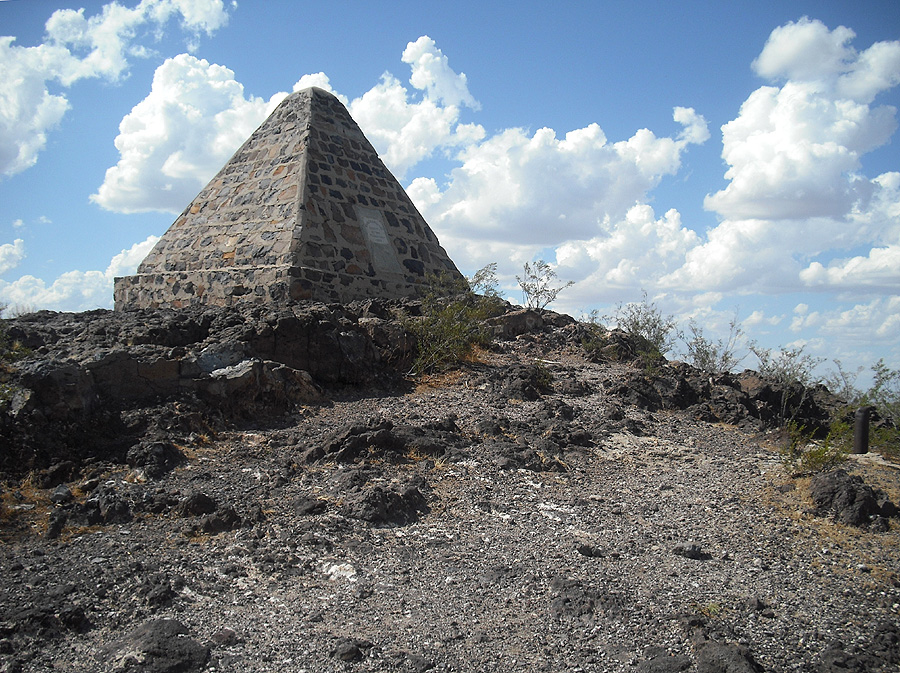
Tomb of Charles D. Poston

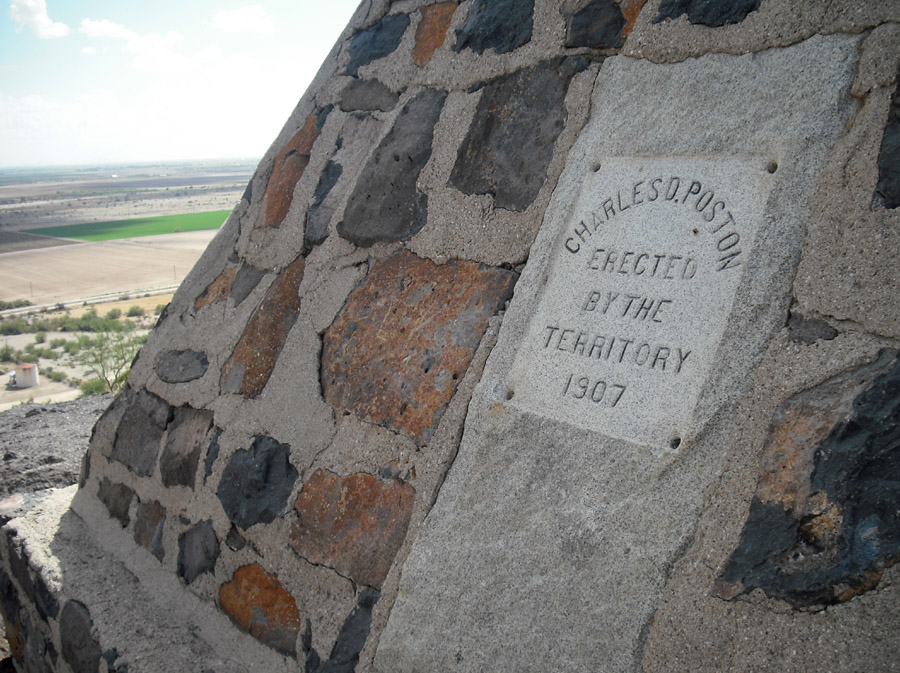
Inscription on Poston's tomb
