= Steuden =

- Ortsteil of Teutschenthal
- Interactive map of Steuden
- Location within Germany Location within Saxony-Anhalt
- Coordinates: 51°25′N 11°46′E
- Country: Germany
- State: Saxony-Anhalt
- District: Saalekreis
- Municipality: Teutschenthal

Area
  - Total: 13.69 km^{2} (5.29 sq mi)
- Elevation: 130 m (430 ft)

Population (2006-12-31)
  - Total: 955
  - Density: 69.8/km^{2} (181/sq mi)
- Time zone: UTC+01:00 (CET)
  - Summer (DST): UTC+02:00 (CEST)
- Postal codes: 06179
- Dialling codes: 034636
- Website: www.steuden.de

Steuden is a village and a former municipality in the district Saalekreis, in Saxony-Anhalt, Germany.

Since 1 January 2010, it is part of the municipality Teutschenthal.
