= Teutschenthal =

- Municipality
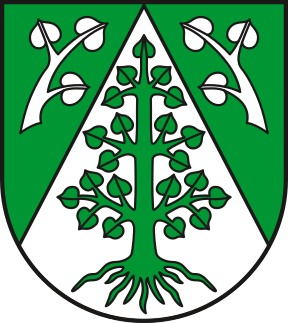
- Coat of arms

- Location of Teutschenthal within Saalekreis district
- Interactive map of Teutschenthal
- Location within Germany Location within Saxony-Anhalt
- Coordinates: 51°27′N 11°48′E
- Country: Germany
- State: Saxony-Anhalt
- District: Saalekreis
- Subdivisions: 9

Government
  - Mayor (2019–26): Tilo Eigendorf

Area
  - Total: 90.63 km^{2} (34.99 sq mi)
- Elevation: 121 m (397 ft)

Population (2025-12-31)
  - Total: 13,009
  - Density: 143.5/km^{2} (371.8/sq mi)
- Time zone: UTC+01:00 (CET)
  - Summer (DST): UTC+02:00 (CEST)
- Postal codes: 06179
- Dialling codes: 0345, 034601
- Vehicle registration: SK
- Website: www.gemeinde-teutschenthal.de

Teutschenthal (German pronunciation: [ˈtɔʏtʃn̩ˌtaːl]) is a municipality in the Saalekreis district, Saxony-Anhalt, Germany. In January 2005 it absorbed the former municipalities Holleben and Zscherben, in January 2010 Dornstedt, Langenbogen and Steuden and in September 2010 Angersdorf.

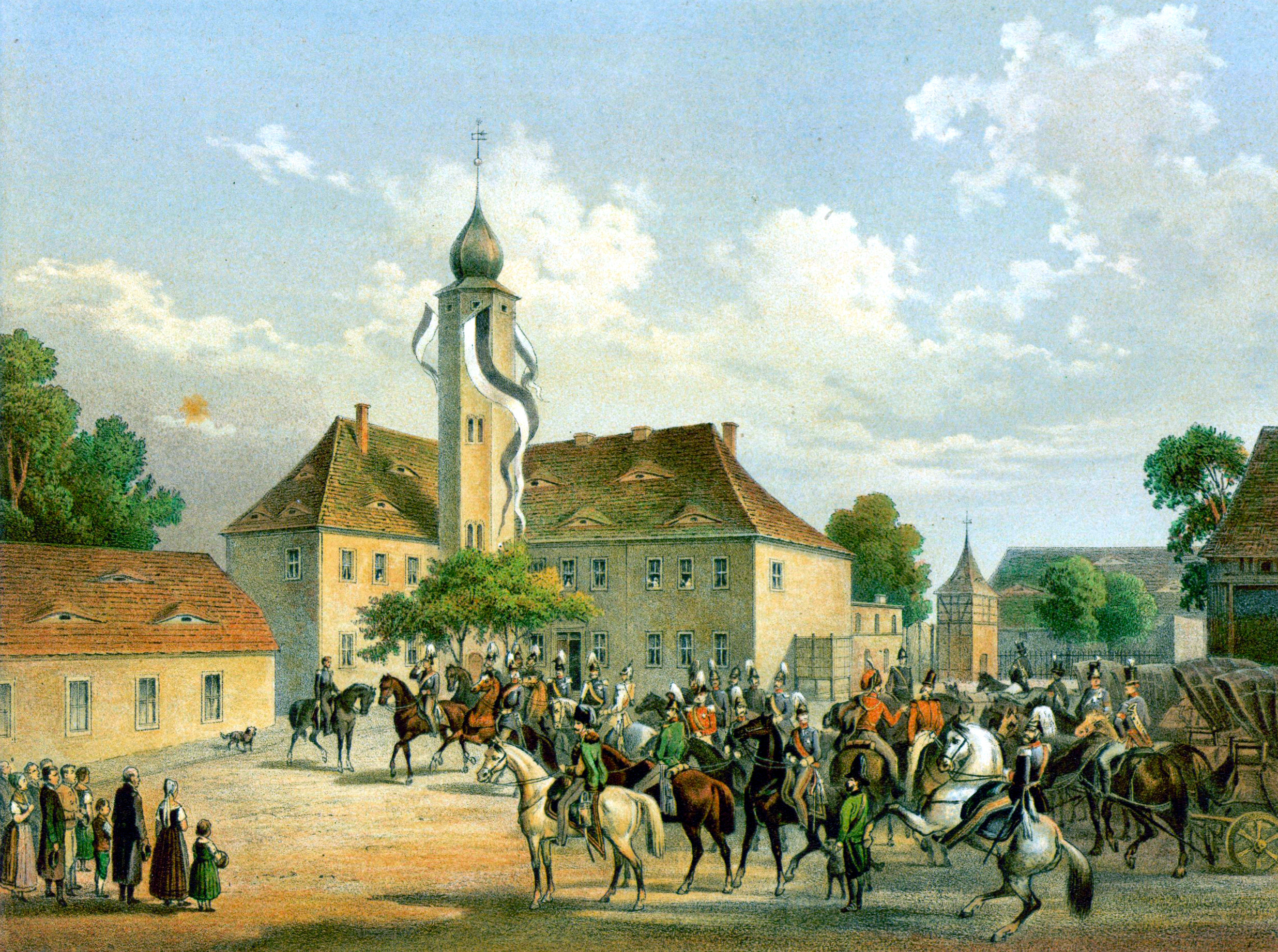
Rittergut Würdenburg, around 1860, Edition by Alexander Duncker

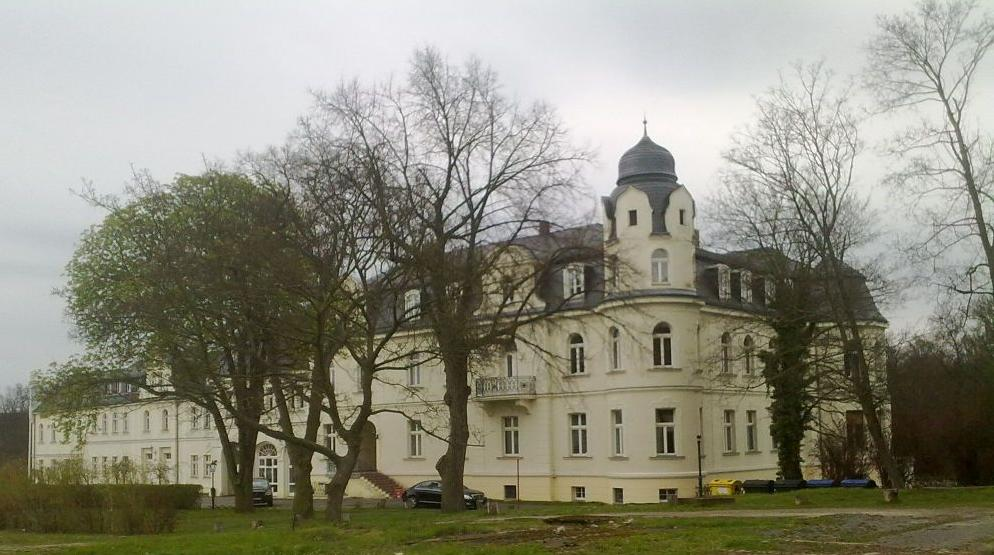
Palace Teutschenthal
