= New Orleans Greys =

Volunteer Texas military unit

- Active: 1835-1836
- Country: United States
- Allegiance: Republic of Texas
- Type: volunteers (militia)
- Role: Ground-based military warfare
- Size: 2 companies (122 men)
- Part of: Texian Army
- Engagements: Texas Revolution: Siege of Bexar; Goliad Campaign; Siege of the Alamo; Battle of San Jacinto

Commanders
- Notable commanders: Stephen F. Austin; Thomas H. Breece; Robert C. Morris; Sam Houston; James Fannin †; William Travis †; James Bowie †; Davy Crockett †

The New Orleans Greys was a Military volunteer unit of two militia companies that totaled about 120, formed in the city of that name for service in the Texas War of Independence. Its name came from its soldiers' grey military fatigues.

== Companies formed ==
The New Orleans Greys was organized in New Orleans on October 13, 1835, at Bank's Arcade, a coffee house on Magazine Street. Adolphus Sterne, a Nacogdoches businessman, favored the Texas Revolution and provided weapons for the first volunteers.

The New Orleans Greys was composed of two companies. One company of 54 men served under Captain Thomas H. Breece and the other company of 68 men under Captain Robert C. Morris, as well as several companies of Texians who had arrived recently, were eager to face the Mexican Army directly.

== Texas War of Independence ==
Twenty-three Greys fought and died at the Battle of the Alamo, one died at the Siege of Béxar, twenty-one were lost in the Goliad Campaign, and seven Greys served at the Battle of San Jacinto.

According to Thomas Ricks Lindley's research, up to 50 of Fannin's men, most of whom primarily had been in Thomas H. Breece's company of New Orleans Greys, left Fannin's command in Goliad to go to the rescue of their former associates at the Alamo. Lindley believes that on March 3 these men must have joined with the Alamo advance relief company under John Chenoweth and Francis L. DeSauque, as well as with Juan Seguin and his Tejano company. That afternoon, the entire group joined with the Gonzales relief unit waiting at the Cibolo Creek, 35 miles (56 km) from the Alamo.

== Uniforms and weapons ==
Unlike most Texian Army volunteers, the New Orleans Greys looked like soldiers, with some uniforms, well-maintained rifles, US-pattern muskets, adequate ammunition, and some semblance of discipline. The Greys had brought an extra unique piece of equipment: a 18-pounder cannon. The 18-pounder had arrived at Velasco with the New Orleans Greys aboard the schooner Columbus. The Greys left it behind when they realized they had forgotten to bring cannonballs for their oversized artillery. A special convoy was sent by Philip Dimmitt, commander of Fort LaBahia, to retrieve the cannon. A party of 20 men was tasked with the mission to haul the 18-pounder cannon from Dimmitt's Landing to San Antonio to use during the siege of Bexar. Others soon joined them, including twenty members of the Greys, until the group totaled 75 men. They struggled with the giant cannon for about 200 miles, pushing and pulling, until they finally rolled into San Antonio. They arrived two days after the battle when General Cos had already surrendered. But all their work was not in vain; the cannon would earn a special place in the Alamo compound when it was used in the Battle of the Alamo

== Bibliography ==
- Barr, Alwyn (1990). Texans in Revolt: The Battle for San Antonio, 1835. Austin: University of Texas Press. ISBN 978-0-292-77042-3.
- Brown, Gary (2004). Volunteers in the Texas Revolution: The New Orleans Greys. Lanham, MD: Taylor Trade Publishing.
- Humphrey, David C. (2009). Peg Leg: The Improbable Life of a Texas Hero, Thomas William Ward, 1807–1872. Denton, TX: Texas State Historical Association. ISBN 978-0-87611-237-3.
- Lindley, Thomas Ricks (2003). Alamo Traces: New Evidence and New Conclusions. Lanham, MD: Republic of Texas Press. ISBN 1-55622-983-6.
