= Texian Army =

Army that fought for the independence of what became the Republic of Texas

Texian Army Revolutionary Army Army of the People
- Active: October 1, 1835 – April 21, 1836
- Country: Republic of Texas
- Allegiance: Republic of Texas; Consultation (Texian provisional government); Constitution of the Republic of Texas
- Type: Artillery; Line infantry Militia; Mounted infantry Ranger
- Role: Artillery observer Cavalry tactics Charge; Desert warfare Force protection Guerrilla warfare Indirect fire Line formation Maneuver warfare Patrolling; Raiding; Reconnaissance; Screening; Shock tactics Skirmishers; Tracking
- Size: 3,685-3,700 (approximated)
- Engagements: Texas Revolution; Battle of Gonzales; Battle of Goliad; Battle of Concepción; Battle of Lipantitlán; Grass Fight; Siege of Béxar; Battle of San Patricio; Battle of Agua Dulce; Battle of the Alamo; Battle of Refugio; Battle of Coleto; Battle of San Jacinto

Commanders
- Notable commanders: Stephen F. Austin; Sam Houston (WIA); James Fannin (executed); William Travis †; James Bowie †; Davy Crockett †; Frank W. Johnson; Edward Burleson; George Fisher; Philip Dimmitt; John Linn; George Collinsworth; Benjamin Milam †; William Scott; William Ward (executed); George H. Burroughs; Thomas H. Breece; Robert C. Morris; Jack Shackelford; Juan Seguín; Plácido Benavides; Salvador Flores; Manuel Leal

The Texian Army, also known as the Revolutionary Army and Army of the People, was the land warfare branch of the Texian armed forces during the Texas Revolution. It spontaneously formed from the Texian Militia in October 1835 following the Battle of Gonzales. Along with the Texian Navy, it helped the Republic of Texas win independence from the Centralist Republic of Mexico on May 14, 1836 at the Treaties of Velasco. Although the Texas Army was officially established by the Consultation of the Republic of Texas on November 13, 1835, it did not replace the Texian Army until after the Battle of San Jacinto.

== Organization ==
When Mexico gained its independence from Spain in 1821, the former Spanish province of Texas became part of the Mexican state Coahuila y Tejas. Many of the people who lived in Texas, which had included the land north of the Medina and the Nueces Rivers, 100 miles (161 km) northeast of the Rio Grande, west of San Antonio de Bexar, and east of the Sabine River, wished to be a separate state again. For the first time, the government of Texas encouraged immigrants from the United States to settle its lands. By 1834, an estimated 30,000 English speakers lived in Texas, compared to only 7,800 of Spanish heritage. The bankrupt Mexican government was unable to offer Texas much military support. Many of the settlements had created small militias to protect themselves against raids by Indian tribes.

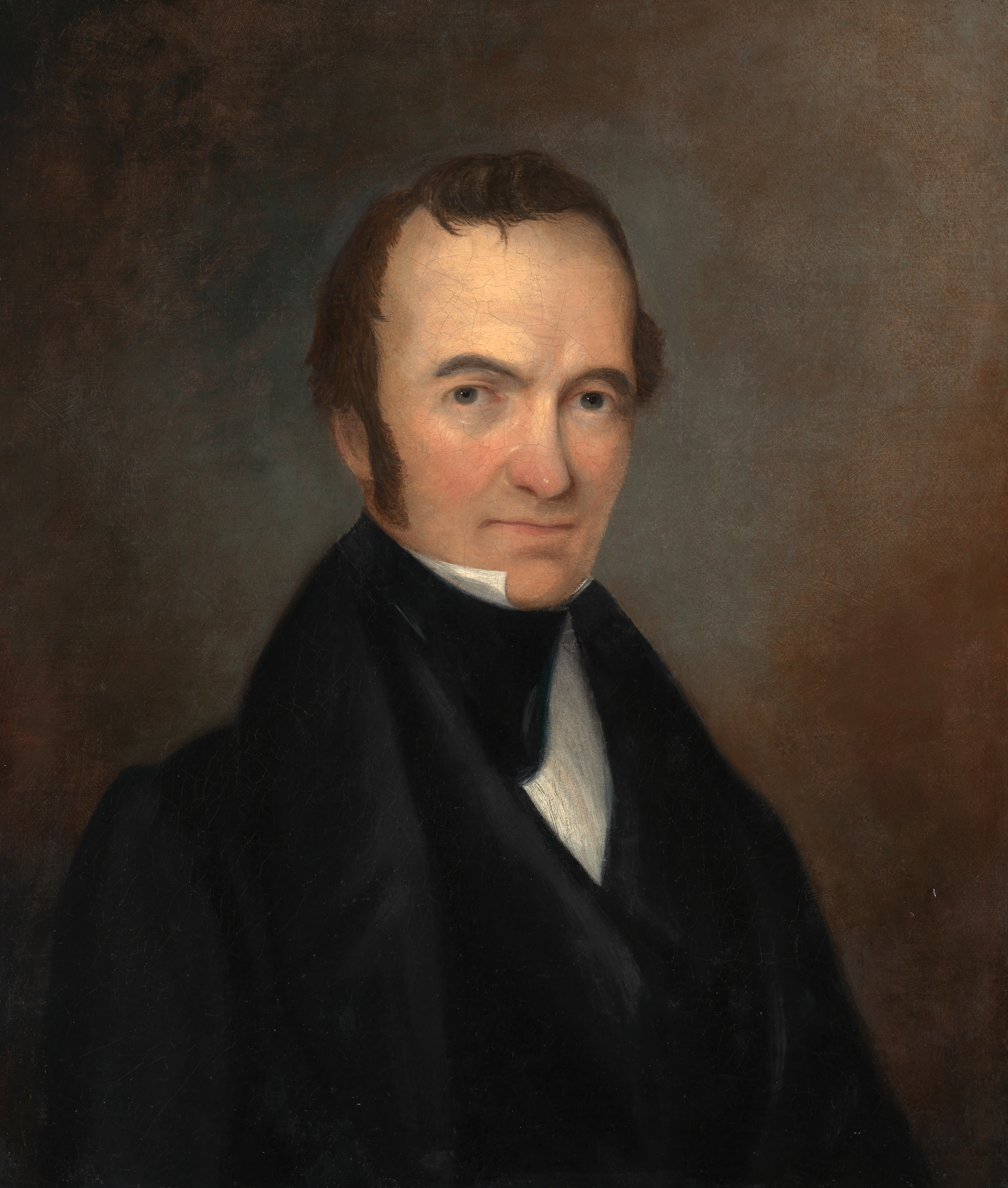
Texian Army volunteers elected Stephen F. Austin their first commander-in-chief.

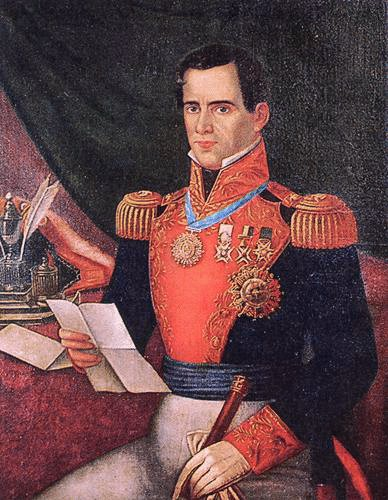
General and President of Mexico Antonio López de Santa Anna issued orders to the Mexican Army to show no quarter to the Texian Army rebels

Under President Antonio López de Santa Anna the government of Mexico began to drift towards a more centralist form. In 1835 Santa Anna revoked the Constitution of 1824 and began reigning as a dictator. In various parts of the country federalists revolted.

In September 1835, Colonel Domingo Ugartechea, the military commander of the Mexican forces at San Antonio de Bexar set troops to recover a small cannon that had been given to the Texian Militia of Gonzales for protection. When the Mexican troops, under Lieutenant Francisco de Castañeda, reached Gonzales, Texian commander Captain Albert Martin convinced the troops to wait for several days. Martin then sent messengers to other English-speaking settlements, asking for reinforcements to help protect the cannon.

Within several days, militias from Fayette County and Columbus arrived. In Gonzales, the Texian Militias combined to form the Texian Army and chose John Henry Moore as their captain, Joseph Washington Elliot Wallace as a lieutenant colonel, and Edward Burleson as major. The first military action taken by the new army was the Battle of Gonzales on October 2, 1835. After a skirmish, the Mexican troops withdrew to San Antonio, leaving the cannon with the Texians. After the battle ended, disgruntled colonists continued to assemble in Gonzales, eager to put a decisive end to Mexican control over the area. The Committee of Safety at San Felipe named the gathering "The Army of the People."

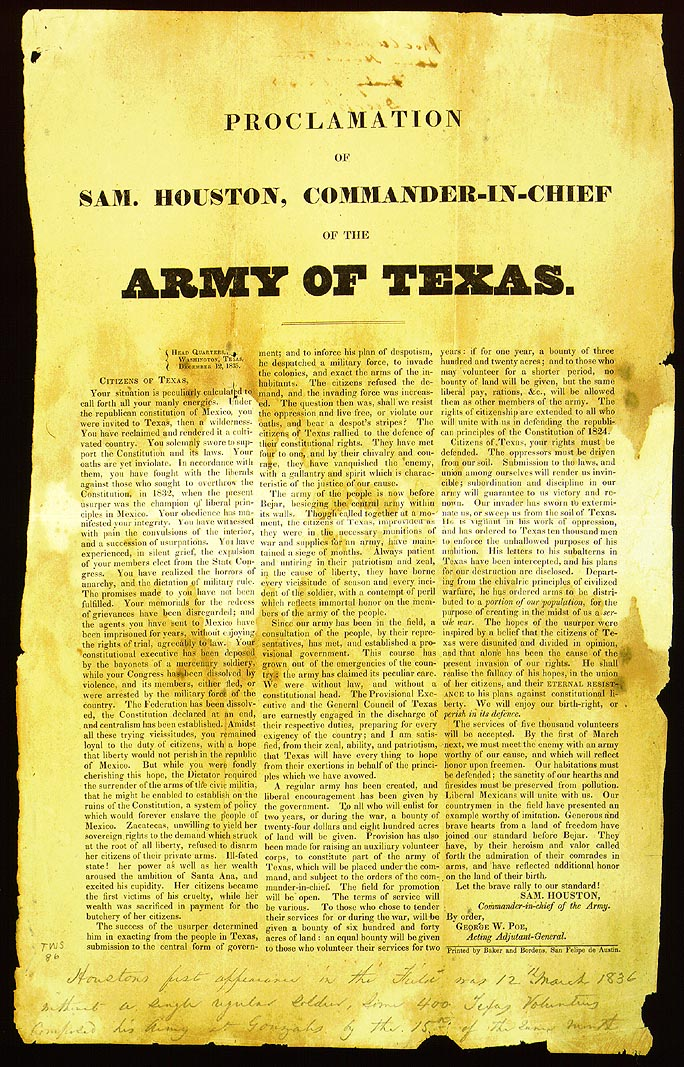
Sam Houston's call for the Army of Texas recruitment proclamation on December 12, 1835

Within a week, the men had taken the Mexican post at Goliad. On October 11, the disorganized volunteers elected Stephen F. Austin, who had settled Texas's first English-speaking colonists in 1821, as their commander-in-chief. Austin had only two months of military experience in the Missouri First Regiment of Mounted Militia under Colonel Alexander McNair, where he earned the rank of quartermaster sergeant, but he saw no combat.

== Demographics ==
In 1836, Texas had a population of 40,000 people. Approximately 2,000 of the citizens, around 5% of the population, served in the army at some point between October 1835 and April 1846. Still, Historian Paul Lack argues that "for a people of such fabled militance, the Texians turned out for army duty in the period of crisis at a low rate of participation". The army was augmented with volunteers from the United States.

Overall, 3,685 men served in the Army of the People between October 1, 1835 and April 21, 1836. Forty percent of them had emigrated after October 1. Of the Texians, 57.8% were residents of the Department of the Brazos, 10.4% of the Department of Bexar, and 31.7% from the Department of Nacogdoches. Of the men who arrived in Texas after October 1, 1835, not all of these additions were American citizens; many were recent immigrants from Europe who were seeking adventure and potential riches in Texas. Through the course of the Texas Revolution, one in seven of the English-speaking settlers in Texas joined the army. One in three adult male Tejanos, that is, Spanish-speaking settlers in Texas, joined the Texan army.

The composition of the army changed dramatically over time, with four distinct waves:

- the army of October – December 1835, which participated in the battles of Gonzales, Goliad and the Siege of Bexar
- the army from January through March 1836
- the army of mid-March through April, 1836, which participated in the Battle of San Jacinto
- the army of May – September 1836

The early army was composed predominantly of Texas residents, with every municipality represented. Over 1,300 men volunteered for the army in October and November 1835. Of these, approximately 1,100–1,500 were residents of Texas, with an average date of emigration of 1830. (Note: If the recent arrivals from the United States are considered, the average date of emigration rises to 1832. Lack (1992), pp. 114–5.) Half of the men were married. Roughly 51% of them came from the Department of the Brazos, an area in central Texas which consisted of the colonies established by Stephen F. Austin and Green DeWitt, as well as some of the area granted to Sterling C. Robertson. An additional 15% of the volunteers were from the Department of Bexar, where most citizens were Tejano, and which was partially occupied by Mexican troops. Thirty-four percent of the volunteers came from the Nacogdoches district of far East Texas, an area where homes and families were not under threat.

After the Texas victory in Bexar in early December, men began leaving the army and returning to their homes. By the end of February 1836, fewer than 600 men remained in the army. A total of 917 men served in the army for varying lengths of time in January – March 1836. In a sharp contrast from the army of a few months prior, these men were predominantly newcomers to Texas. The overwhelming majority—78%—had arrived from the United States since the outbreak of hostilities in October. They had an average age of 27, and almost two-thirds were single. Of the Texians who continued to participate, 57% were from the areas most at risk of Mexican attempts to reassert control over its national territory—Bexar, Gonzales, Matagorda and Jackson—despite the small population of these areas. When examined in the context of the political districts, 59% of the Texians were from the Brazos department and 23% from Bexar.

The army suffered significant losses at the battles of the Alamo and Coleto. The provisional government passed conscription laws, which should have resulted in about 4,000 men joining the army. The laws were impossible to enforce due to the fact that most citizens had fled as part of the Runaway Scrape. By the Battle of San Jacinto on April 21, new commander Sam Houston had a total of 1,282 recruits in the army. Of these, about 250 were ill, at camp, or on scouting missions at the time of the battle.

The average date of emigration was 1835; 21% of the men had arrived in Texas after October 1, 1835, and almost 18% had arrived between January 1 and October 1, 1835. Approximately 60% of the soldiers were single, and their average age was 28. In many families, the younger sons joined the army while the fathers escorted the women and younger children east, away from the advancing Mexican army. 67% of the Texians who volunteered were from the Brazos Department, an impressive number considering the heavy losses many of these areas had sustained in the March fighting. 25% were from the Nacogdoches district, fewer than had served in 1835. Only 5% of the Texians were from the Bexar District. This number was low both because many of the volunteers had perished at the Alamo or Coleto and because the area was now occupied by the Mexican army. It was not only difficult for men to leave the area, but it was unwise to leave their families. The majority of the men from Bexar who served in April were cavalry officers under the command of Colonel Juan Seguin.

An additional 623 men served in April outside of Houston's army. Less is known about these men, who had no central command or location. It is estimated that 31% were recent arrivals from the United States. They were older, with an average age of 34, and over 41% of them came from the Nacogdoches district. Historian Paul Lack described these men as a home guard, a "last line of defense" for the Texians.

398 men served in both 1835 and April 1836. Of these, 58% were single, with an average age of 30, and 26% had arrived in Texas after the war began. Of the Texians, 63% were from the Brazos district, 11% from Bexar, and 26% from Nacogdoches. Lack posits that many of those who chose not to re-enlist in April 1836 believed that they had done their duty. For the most part, they were older and, as they had been in Texas longer, they had more to protect.

Believing the hostilities were over, by the end of May, most of the Texas residents had left the army, which shrank to 400 men. With fears of a Mexican counterattack spreading, more volunteers arrived from the United States. By June, the ranks had increased to 1300–1700 men, and by September to 2,500 men, spread across 53 companies. Of those in the army in September, 1,800 had come to Texas after the Battle of San Jacinto.

== Formation and structure ==
The structure of the Texian Army was relatively fluid. Originally, it was composed entirely Texian Militia who came and went at will. To become an officer, a man must simply have had enough money or charisma to convince others to serve under him. In the first half of the Texas Revolution, many of the units and individual volunteers came from the United States. The United States volunteer units in the Army represented ten states; from New Orleans, Louisiana the New Orleans Greys, from Alabama the Red Rovers, Huntsville Rovers, and Mobile Greys, from Mississippi the Mississippi Guards and Natchez Mustangs, from New York the 1st New York Battalion and 2nd New York Battalion and from other states the Georgia Volunteers, Kentucky Mustangs, Missouri Invincibles, North Carolina Volunteers, and Tennessee Mounted Volunteers, and Union Guards

By the end of the war, the army had grown to include three distinct divisions. Members of the regular army enlisted for two years and were subject to army discipline and the army's chain of command. A squad of permanent volunteers enlisted for the duration of the war. This group was permitted to elect its own officers, outside the oversight of the army commander-in-chief. Most of the men who joined the permanent volunteers had settled in Texas before the war had begun, both Tejano and Texians. The last unit was the volunteer auxiliary corps, comprising primarily recent arrivals from the United States who officially enlisted for a six-month term. On November 24, 1835, the Texas provisional government authorized the creation of ranging companies of rifleman. Robert "Three-legged Willie" Williamson was asked to raise three of these companies with 56 men each. Rangers were to be paid $1.25 per day.

=== Republic Army ===
==== Texian regular army and permanent volunteer units ====
- Texas Rangers (paramilitary unit)
- Infantry (militia)
- Mounted Volunteers (militia)
- Mounted Gunmen (militia)
- Mounted Riflemen (militia)
- Spies (militia)
- Ranging Corps. (militia)
- Mounted Rangers (militia)
- Army
- Minute Men (militia)
- Juan Seguín's Mexican Tejano Volunteers (militia)

==== United States volunteer auxiliary corps units ====
- Alabama Red Rovers (Alabama Volunteers) (Courtland, Alabama)
- Georgia Battalion (Georgia Volunteers) (Macon, Georgia)
- Huntsville Rovers (Huntsville, Alabama)
- Kentucky Mustangs
- Mississippi Guards
- Missouri Invincibles
- Mobile Greys (Alabama Volunteers) (Mobile, Alabama)
- Natchez Mustangs (Natchez, Mississippi)
- New Orleans Greys (New Orleans, Louisiana)
- 1st New York Battalion
- 2nd New York Battalion
- North Carolina Volunteers
- Tennessee Mounted Volunteers (Tennessee Volunteers)
- Union Guards (?)

== Texian Army flags ==
Come and Take It Flag
This flag design made reference to the cannon used by Texian Army troops under the command of John Henry Moore at the Battle of Gonzales on October 2, 1835. The Texian cannon on the flag with motto "Come and Take It" was used during the battle to antagonize the Mexican Army to try and capture the cannon.

Brown's Independence Flag
This flag had a "Bloody Arm" design and was supposedly used by Captain William S. Brown during the Mexican Army's Siege of Bexar from October 12 - December 11, 1835.

Scott's Liberals Flag
This flag was used by the "Liberals" under the command of Captain William Scott at the Battle of Concepcion on October 28, 1835.

Red Rovers Flag
This flag had a solid red field design and was used by the Red Rovers of Alabama under the command of Captain Jack Shackelford at the Battle of Coleto from March 19–20, 1836 and the Battle of Goliad on October 9, 1835. After the Goliad battle the Red Rovers and James Fannin's troops were captured and killed in the Goliad Massacre

New Orleans Greys Flag
This flag emblazoned with the American bald eagle was used by the First Company of New Orleans Greys volunteers under the commands of Captain Thomas H. Breece and Robert C. Morris participated in driving the Mexican Army from San Antonio and many were captured and later killed in the Goliad Massacre. Elements of the New Orleans Grays fought in the Battle of San Jacinto on April 21, 1836.

Troutman Flag
This flag designed by Joanna Troutman was used by the Georgia Battalion under the command of William Ward which marched from Macon, Georgia to participate in the fight against Mexico and were killed in the Battle of the Alamo in 1836

Alamo Flag
This flag made reference to the Mexican Constitution of 1824 and to the original design of the 1821 Mexican tri-color flag following independence from Spain. The flag was allegedly used by the co-commanders of the Alamo William Barret Travis and James Bowie who the flew flag during the Siege of the Alamo from March–April 1836.

Coahuila y Tejas Flag
This flag was originally designed to be used jointly as an independence flag by the former Mexican states of Coahuila and Tejas from 1824–1835 with the tri-color field of the 1824 national flag of Mexico and the two yellow stars representing the sovereign nations of Coahuila y Tejas. The flag was allegedly raised by the Texian Army in 1836 inside the Alamo in defiance of the besieging Mexican Army.

Dodson Flag
This flag was the first "Lone Star flag" of Texas and was used as a military flag created by Sarah Dodson for her husband, Archelaus who was a member of the Texas Volunteers. It was used during the siege of San Antonio and the capture of the Alamo.

San Felipe Flag
This flag was allegedly designed by Gail Borden of condensed milk fame. The flag was used by the San Felipe Militia of the Texian Army under the command of Captain Moseley Baker and First Lieutenant John P. Borden, brother of Gail Borden supposedly flown at the Battle of San Jacinto on April 21, 1836.

Burroughs' Ohio Flag
This flag emblazoned with the American bald eagle and the white Texas star on a blue field of the Zavala Flag imposed in the background design was used by Captain George H. Burroughs and his Zanesville, Ohio militia company flew at the Battle of San Jacinto on April 21, 1836.

San Jacinto Liberty Flag
This flag had a "Lady Liberty" design and was used by the Second Regiment of the Texian Army under the command of Colonel Sidney Sherman at the Battle of San Jacinto on April 21, 1836.

Zavala Flag
This flag was the first official flag of the Republic of Texas designed by Texas Constitutional delegate, Lorenzo de Zavala, being in use as early as March 1836 which would have been the last official flag of the Texian Army.

== Notable Texian Army commanders and officers ==
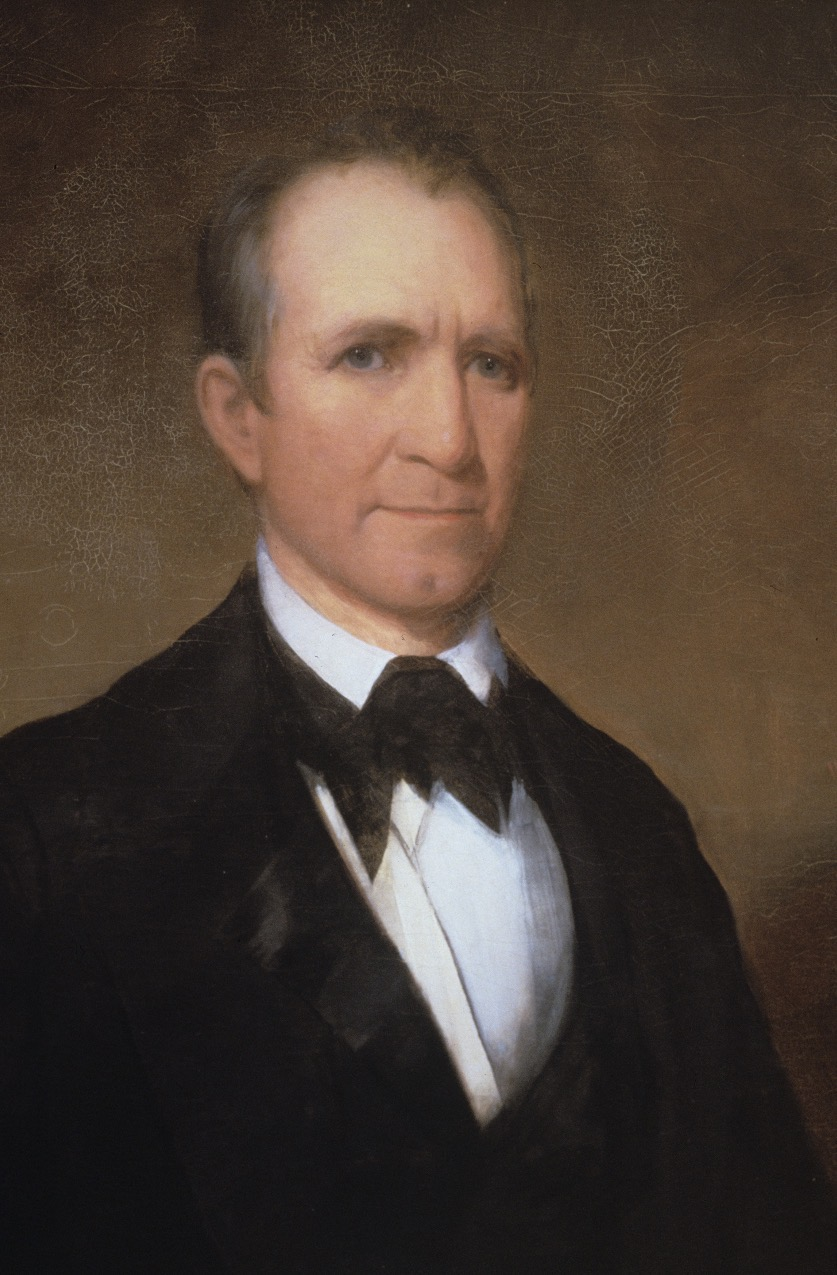
Commander-In-Chief Major General Sam Houston

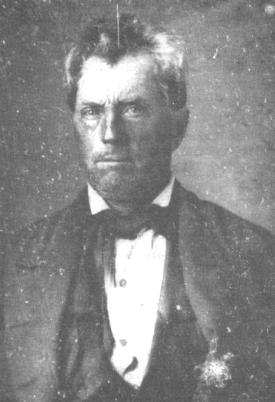
Commander Major General Edward Burleson

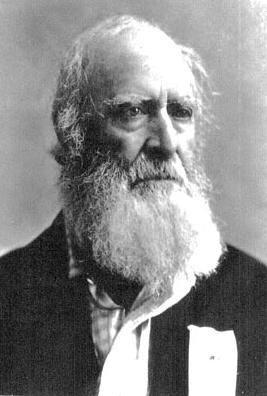
Adjutant and Inspector General Frank W. Johnson

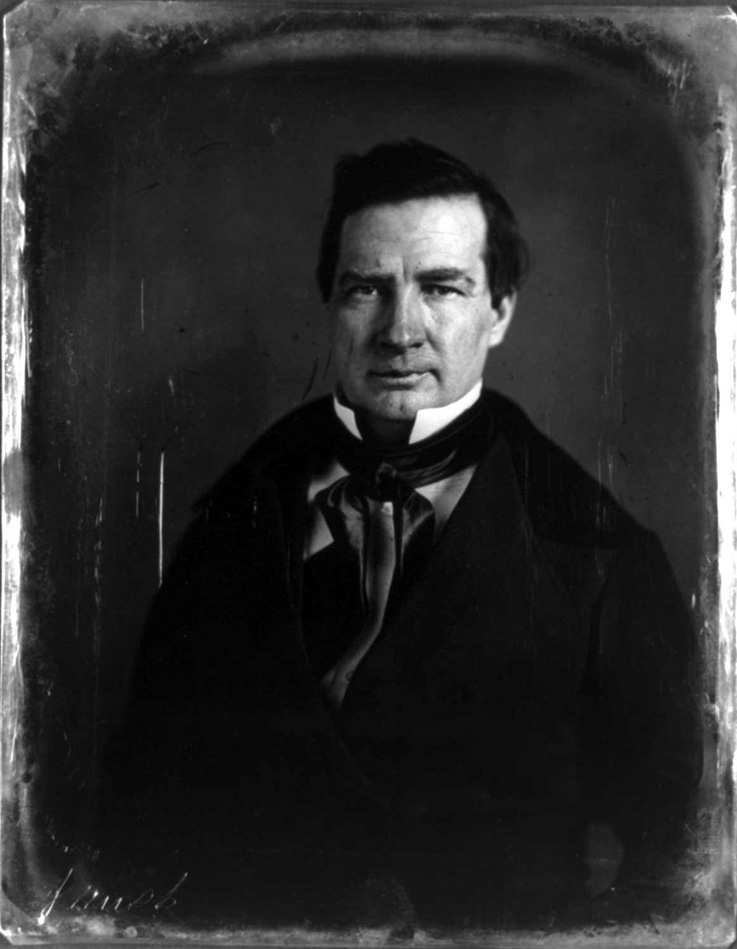
Inspector General Thomas Jefferson Rusk

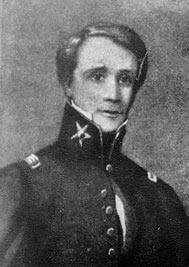
Colonel Sidney Sherman

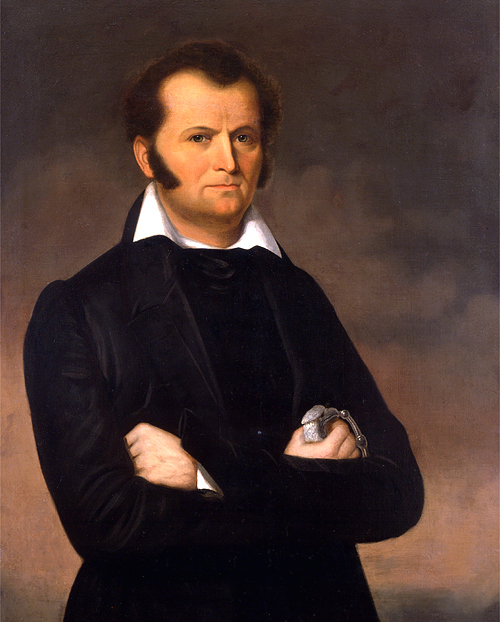
Colonel James Bowie

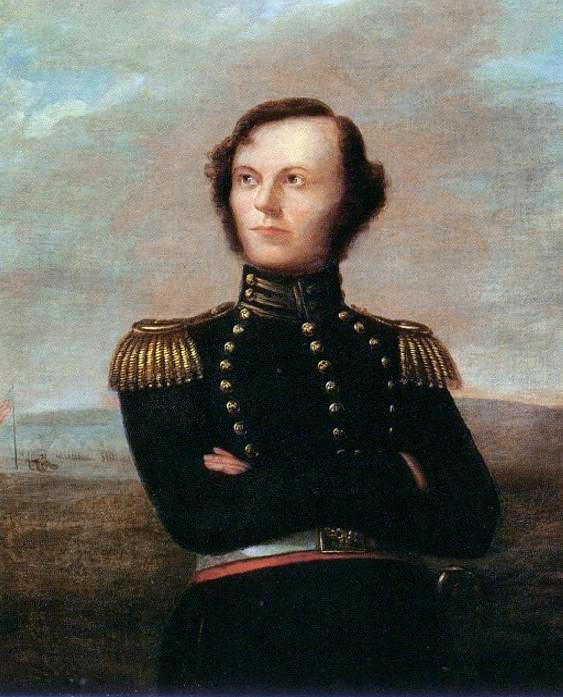
Colonel James Fannin

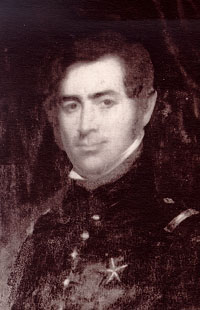
Colonel Benjamin Milam

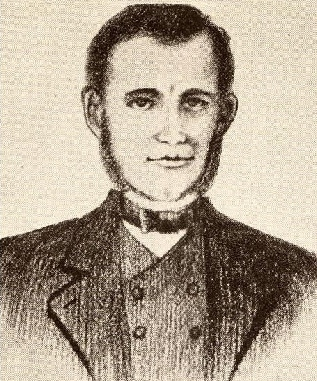
Lieutenant Colonel William B. Travis

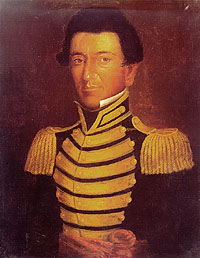
Lieutenant Colonel Juan Seguin

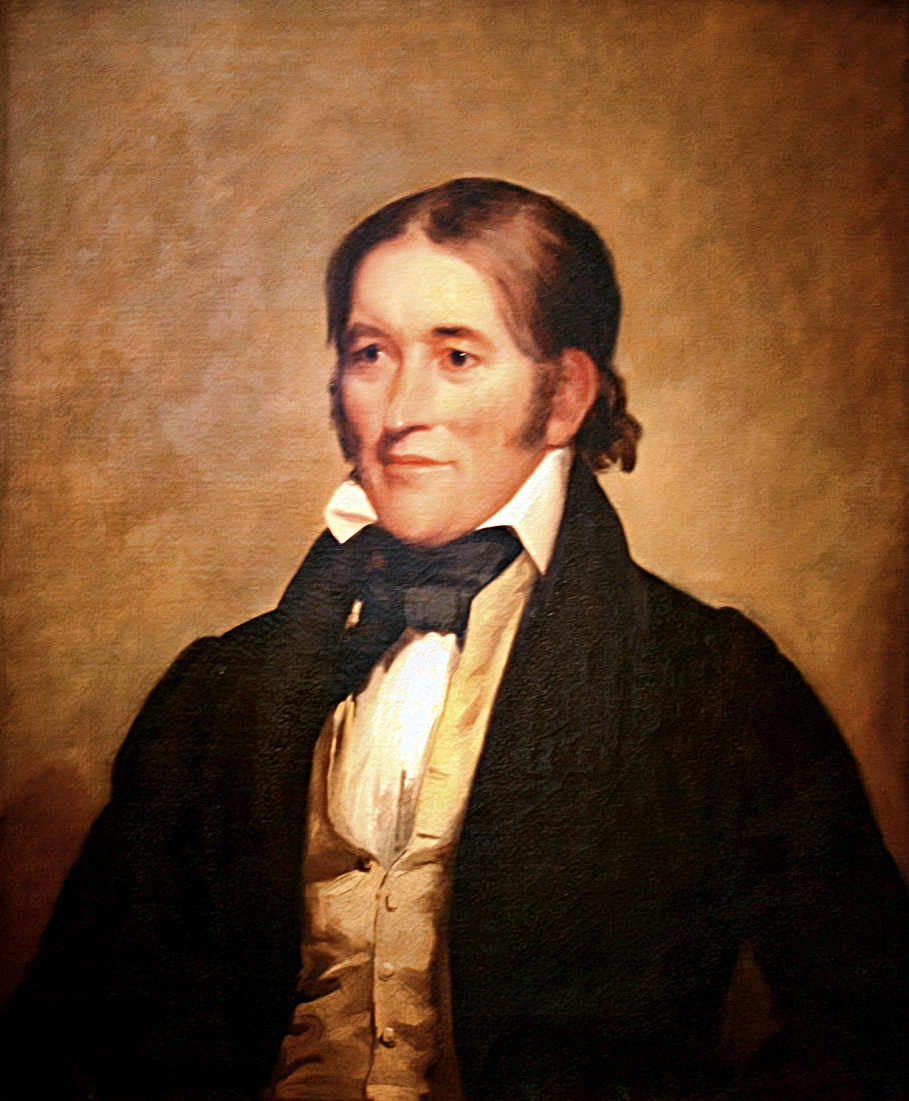
Colonel Davy Crockett

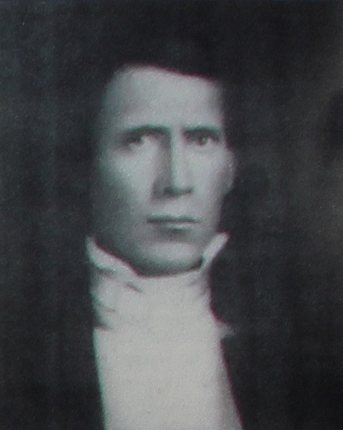
Major Elijah Sterling Clack Robertson

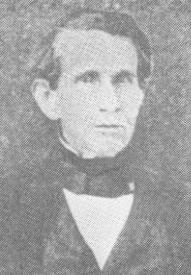
Captain Jack Shackelford

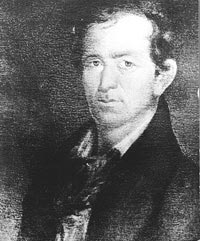
Captain Erastus "Deaf" Smith

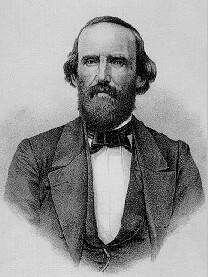
First Lieutenant Benjamin McCulloch

== Notable soldiers ==
- John Melville Allen, first mayor of Galveston
- Moseley Baker, member of Alabama Congress; member of the Republic of Texas Congress
- Gail Borden, inventor of process for condensed milk and namesake of Borden's Milk
- Andrew Briscoe, signer of the Texas Declaration of Independence, first judge of Harris County, Texas
- Benjamin F. Bryant, founder of the Bryant Station frontier fort and Texas Ranger
- Henry Eustace McCulloch, Texas Ranger; brigadier general Confederate States of America
- Elijah Sterling Clack Robertson, empresario, postmaster of the Republic of Texas
- Juan Seguín, signer of the Texas Declaration of Independence, namesake of Seguin, Texas
- Deaf Smith, headed company of Texas Rangers, namesake of Deaf Smith County, Texas
- George K. Teulon, editor of the Austin City Gazette and publisher of The Western Advocate
- Martin Varner original settler of the Old Three Hundred

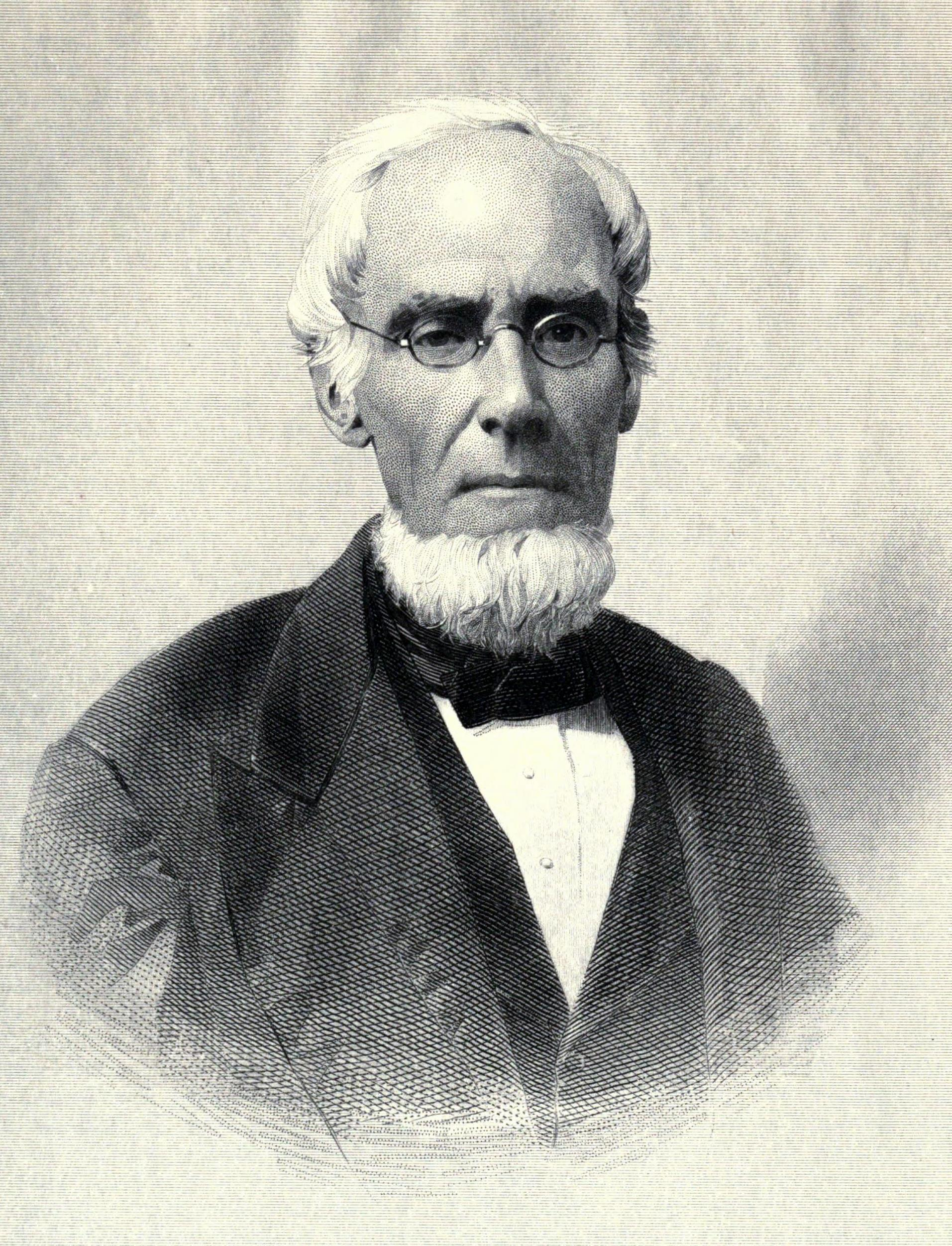
Private Gail Borden of the Texian Army and later of condensed milk fame, with his brother founded the first newspaper in Texas in San Felipe de Austin, the Telegraph and Texas Register which appeared on October 10, 1835, days after the Texas Revolution began.

== Uniforms, weapons, and equipment ==
Neither the regular nor volunteer components of the Texian Army were issued specific uniforms. Several of the companies that formed in the United States, including the New Orleans Greys, purchased U.S. Army surplus uniforms before they arrived. Other companies had more loosely defined "uniforms", such as wearing matching hunting shirts.

Texian volunteer Noah Smithwick wrote a description of the volunteer army as it looked in October 1835:

Words are inadequate to convey an impression of the appearance of the first Texas army as it formed in marching order. ... Buckskin breeches were the nearest approach to uniform and there was wide diversity even there, some of them being new and soft and yellow, while others, from long familiarity with rain and grease and dirt, had become hard and black and shiny. ... Boots being an unknown quantity, some wore shoes and some moccasins. Here a broad brimmed sombrero overshadowed the military cap at its side; there, a tall "beegum" rode familiarly beside a coonskin cap, with the tail hanging down behind, as all well regulated tails should do ... here a bulky roll of bed quilts jostled a pair of "store " blankets; there the shaggy brown buffalo robe contrasted with a gaily colored checkered counterpane on which the manufacturer had lavished all the skill of dye and weave known to art ... in lieu of a canteen, each man carried a Spanish gourd.... Here a big American horse loomed above the nimble Spanish pony, there a half-broke mustang pranced beside a sober methodical mule. A fantastic military array to a casual observer, but the one great purpose animating every heart clothed us in a uniform more perfect in our eyes than was ever donned by regulars on dress parade.

== History ==
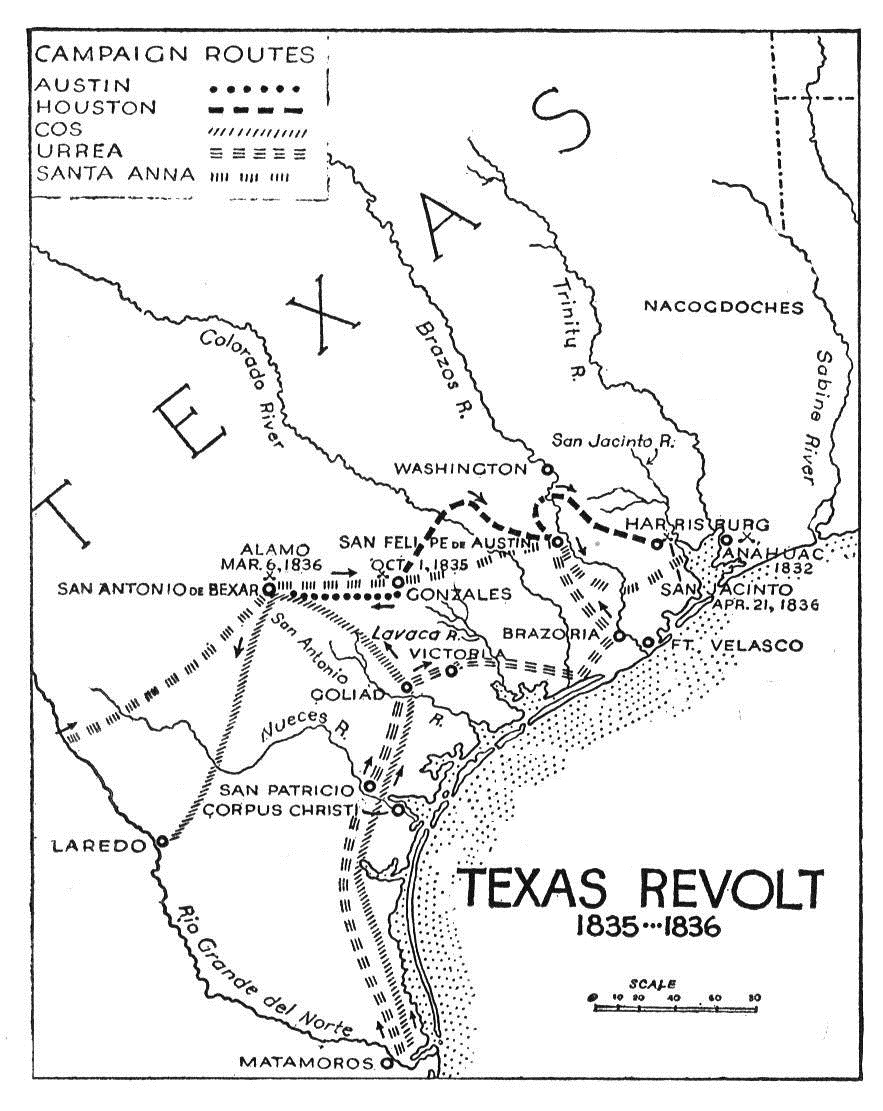
The campaigns of the Texian Army during the Texas Revolution

=== Offensive maneuvers (October – December 1835) ===
Several days after Austin took command, the army marched towards Bexar to confront General Martin Perfecto de Cos, who had recently arrived to command the remaining Mexican troops in Texas.

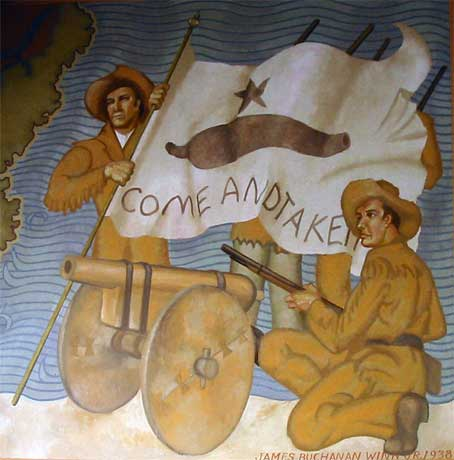
Texian soldiers fighting in the Battle of Gonzales, the first battle of the Texas Revolution

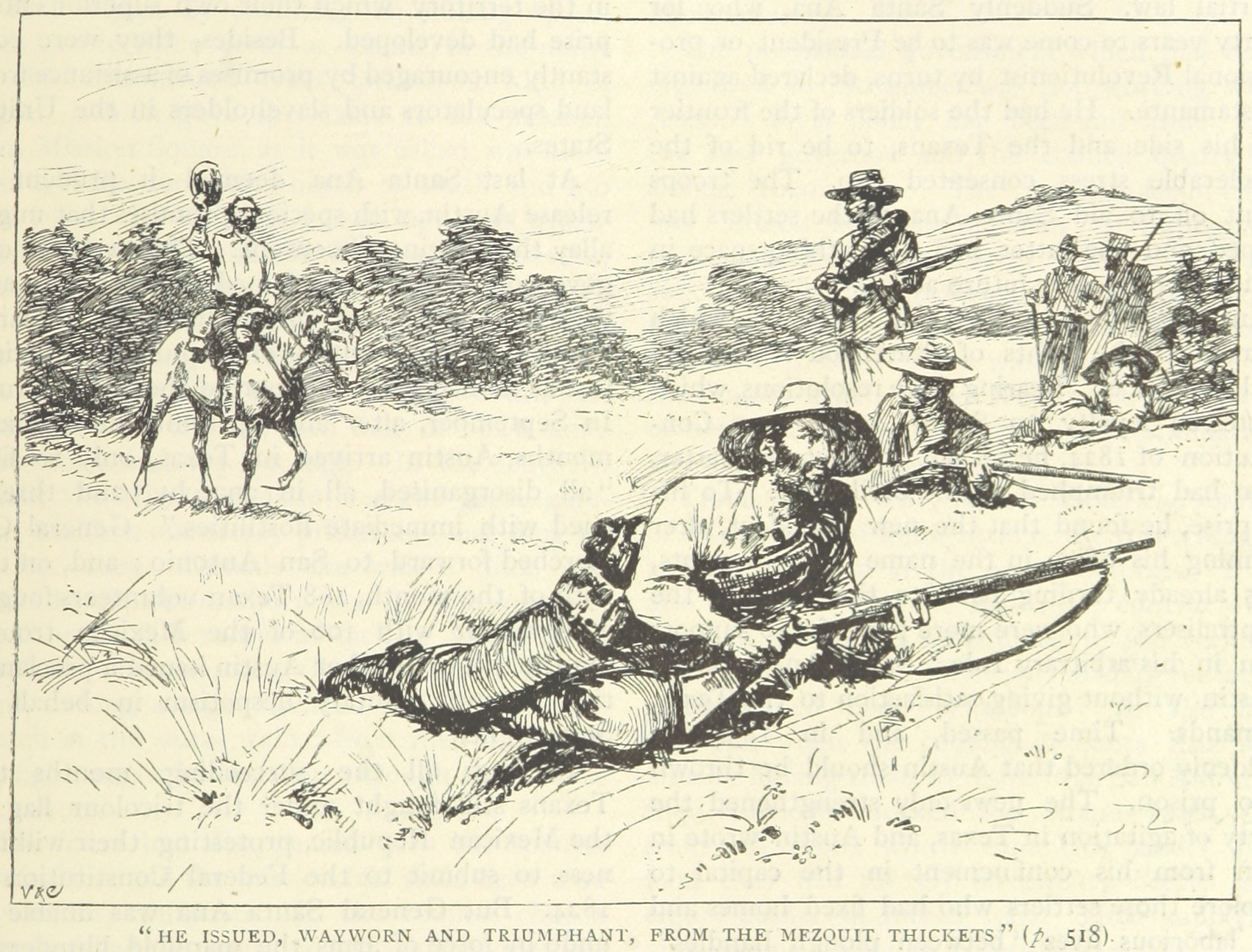
Texian soldiers in the victory at the Battle of Goliad which was followed by the Goliad Massacre

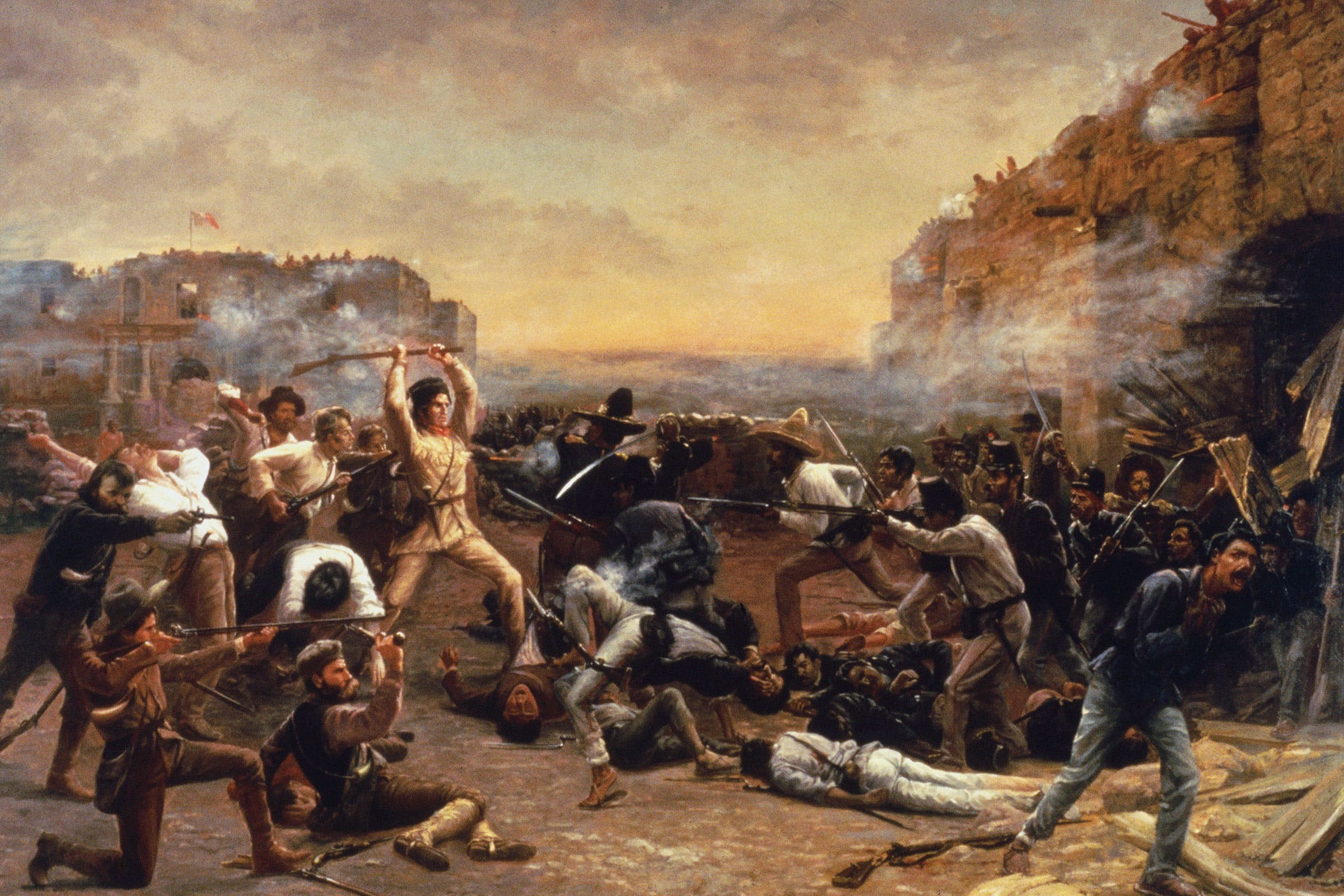
Davy Crockett leading Texian defenders in the Battle of the Alamo which depicted him wielding his rifle as a club against Mexican troops who have breached the walls of the old Spanish mission

=== Restructuring (December 1835 – February 1836) ===
The regular division of the Army was officially established on December 12. Any man who enlisted in the regular division would receive $24 in cash, the rights to 800 acres (320 ha) of land, and instant Texas citizenship. Those who joined the volunteer auxiliary corps would receive 640 acres (260 ha) of land if they served two years, while those who served 1 year would receive 320 acres (130 ha). A month later the establishment of a Legion of Cavalry would be authorized.

The commander of the regular forces, Sam Houston, called for 5,000 men to enlist in the regular army but had difficulty convincing men to join. Many of the arrivals from the United States did not want to be under a more strict military control, and instead informally joined the volunteer units that had gathered in other parts of Texas. These volunteer soldiers were in many cases more impassioned than the Texas settlers. Although the provisional Texas government was still debating whether the troops were fighting for independence or for separate statehood, on December 20, 1835, the Texian garrison at Goliad voted unanimously to issue a proclamation of independence, stating "that the former province and department of Texas is, and of right ought to be, a free, sovereign and independent state".

The provisional government had originally placed Houston in charge of the regular forces, but in December the council gave secret orders to James Fannin, Frank W. Johnson, and Dr. James Grant to prepare forces to invade Mexico. Houston was then ordered to travel to East Texas to broker a treaty that would allow the Cherokee to remain neutral in the conflict. Johnson and Grant gathered 300 of the 400 men garrisoned in Bexar and left to prepare for the invasion.

The government was woefully short of funds. On January 6, 1836, Colonel James C. Neill, commander of the remaining 100 troops in Bexar, wrote to the council: " there has ever been a dollar here I have no knowledge of it. The clothing sent here by the aid and patriotic exertions of the honorable Council, was taken from us by arbitrary measures of Johnson and Grant, taken from men who endured all the hardships of winter and who were not even sufficiently clad for summer, many of them having but one blanket and one shirt, and what was intended for them given away to men some of whom had not been in the army more than four days, and many not exceeding two weeks."

For the next several months it was unclear who was in charge of the Texian army—Fannin, Johnson, Grant, or Houston. On January 10, Johnson issued a call to form a Federal Volunteer Army of Texas which would march on Matamoros during the Matamoros Expedition.

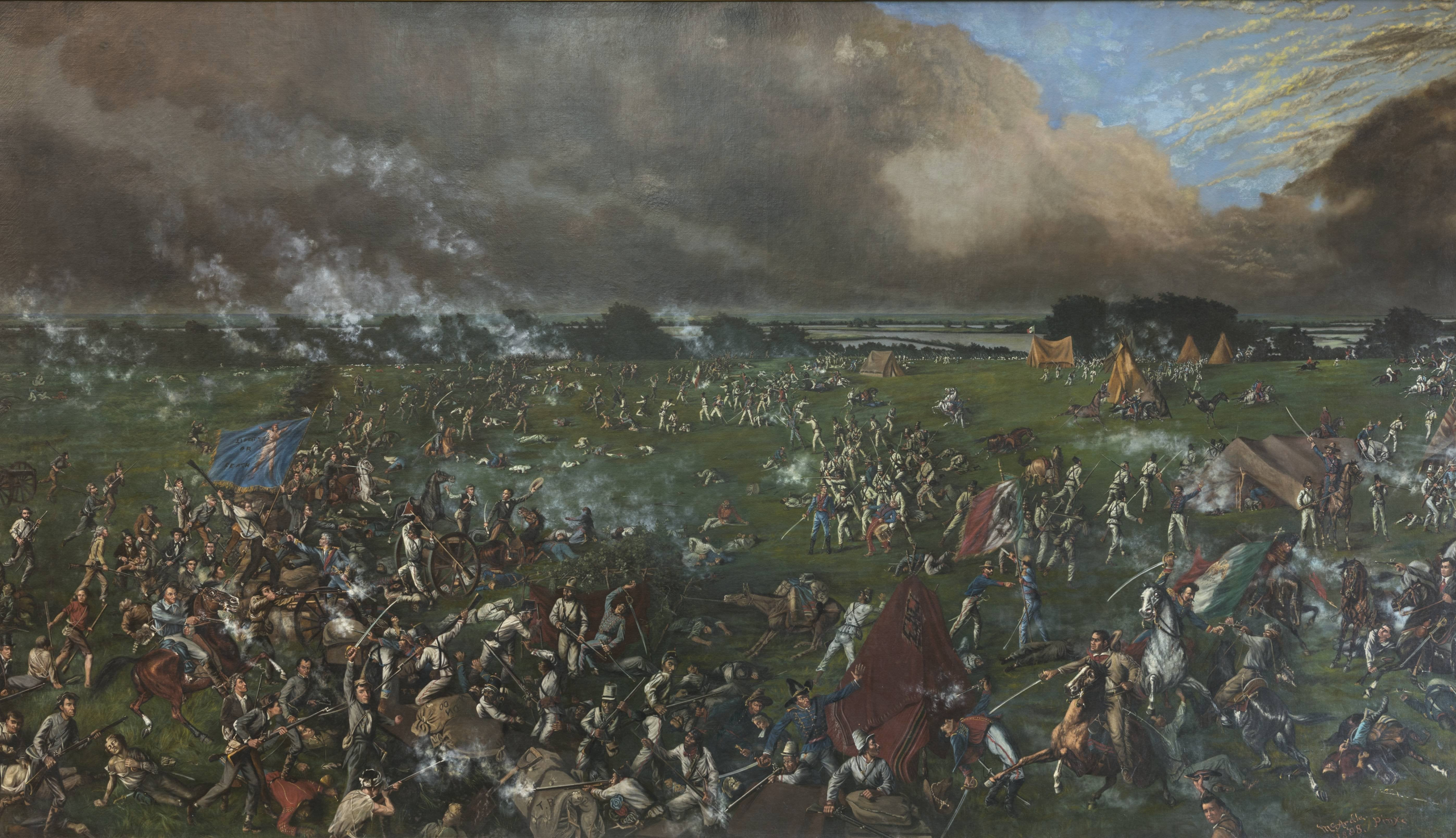
The Texian Army of Sam Houston soundly defeats Mexican forces at the Battle of San Jacinto ending the hostilities of the Texas Revolution.

=== Defensive maneuvers (March – April 1836) ===
The Mexican army returned to Texas in February and initiated a siege of the garrison in San Antonio on February 23. The commander at the Alamo, William B. Travis, sent numerous letters to the Texas settlements, begging for reinforcements. Men began to gather in Gonzales to prepare to reinforce the garrison. Before they left, the Mexican army launched the Battle of the Alamo, and all of the Texian soldiers who had been stationed in Bexar were killed. This left two branches of the Texian Army: Fannin's 400 men at Goliad and Neill's 400 men at Gonzales, who soon reported to Houston. On hearing the news of the massacre at the Alamo, Houston ordered his army to retreat and burned the town of Gonzales as they left. He ordered Fannin to bring his men and join the rest of the army. Fannin's force was defeated at the Battle of Coleto Creek, and on March 27 Fannin and his men were executed at the Goliad Massacre. A few soldiers escaped, and 80 soldiers who had just arrived from the United States and had no weapons were spared.

As news spread of the defeats at the Alamo and Goliad, men flocked to the Texian army. By early April, Houston commanded about 800 men. The Texas Revolution essentially ended on April 21, when the Texian Army routed a Mexican force and captured Santa Anna at the Battle of San Jacinto.

For six months David G. Burnet, ad interim President of the Republic, had diligently maintained the army laws set forth by the Consultation in December 1835. The 1835–36 Regular Army of Texas would never consist of more than 100 soldiers and would never approach the Consultation's number goal of 560 infantry, 560 artillery and 384 cavalry, in the permanent "Regular Army" of Texas. However, the goal of independence was achieved, nonetheless.

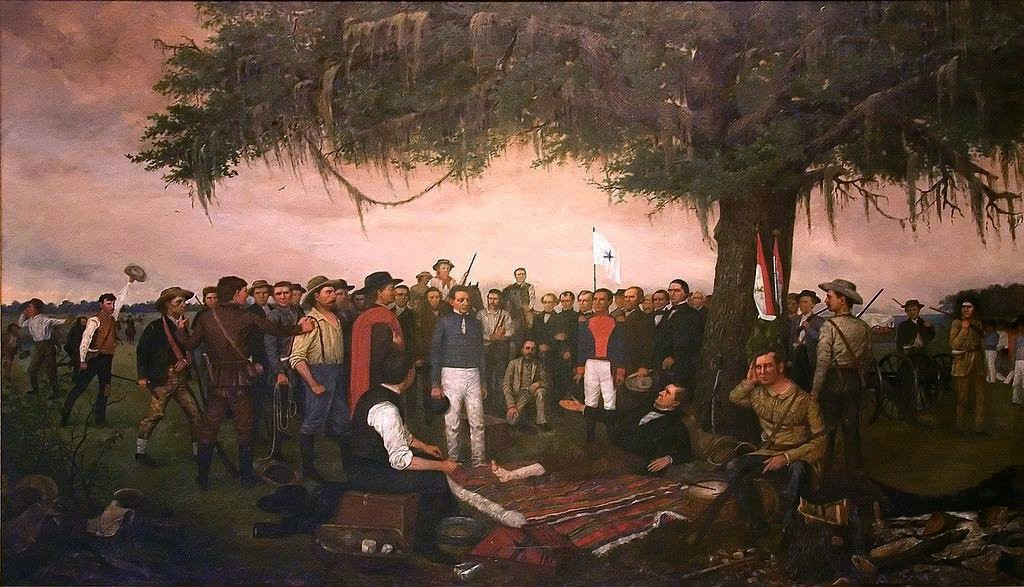
The Commander-in-Chief of the Texian Army Sam Houston lying wounded with his troops at the surrender of the Mexican Army commanded by the Mexican general Santa Anna which brought an end to the war

== In media ==
- 1960: The Alamo, a feature film based on the Battle of the Alamo. Depicts Texas Rangers and Texian Army.
- 2004: The Alamo, a feature film based on the Battle of the Alamo. Depicts Texas Rangers and Texian Army.
- 2015: Texas Rising, a 10-hour miniseries based on the Texas Revolution. Depicts Texas Rangers and Texian Army.
- 2018: The Men Who Built America: Frontiersmen ("Empire or Liberty"), an episode based on the Battle of the Alamo. Depicts Texas Rangers and Texian Army.

== See also ==
- Bibliography of the Texas Revolution, Republic, and Annexation
- Texas Military Forces
- Texas Military Department
- List of conflicts involving the Texas Military
- Awards and decorations of the Texas Military

== Sources ==
- Barr, Alwyn (1990). Texans in Revolt: the Battle for San Antonio, 1835. Austin: University of Texas Press. ISBN 0-292-77042-1.
- Edmondson, J.R. (2000). The Alamo Story – From History to Current Conflicts. Plano: Republic of Texas Press. ISBN 1-55622-678-0.
- Hardin, Stephen L. (1994). Texian Iliad – A Military History of the Texas Revolution. Austin: University of Texas Press. ISBN 0-292-73086-1.
- Lack, Paul D. (1992). The Texas Revolutionary Experience: A Political and Social History 1835–1836. College Station: Texas A&M University Press. ISBN 0-89096-497-1.
- Lindley, Thomas Ricks (2003). Alamo Traces: New Evidence and New Conclusions. Lanham, MD: Republic of Texas Press. ISBN 1-55622-983-6.
- Manchaca, Martha (2001). Recovering History, Constructing Race: The Indian, Black, and White Roots of Mexican Americans. The Joe R. and Teresa Lozano Long Series in Latin American and Latino Art and Culture. Austin: University of Texas Press. ISBN 0-292-75253-9.
- Nofi, Albert A. (1992). The Alamo and the Texas War of Independence, September 30, 1835 to April 21, 1836: Heroes, Myths, and History. Conshohocken, PA: Combined Books, Inc. ISBN 0-938289-10-1.
- Todish, Timothy J.; Todish, Terry; Spring, Ted (1998). Alamo Sourcebook, 1836: A Comprehensive Guide to the Battle of the Alamo and the Texas Revolution. Austin: Eakin Press. ISBN 978-1-57168-152-2.

Preceded by Texian Militia; 1823–1835	Texian Army; 1835–1836	Succeeded by Texas Army; 1836–1845; Texas Militia, 1836–present
