= Dillard Cooper =

Survivor of the Goliad Massacre

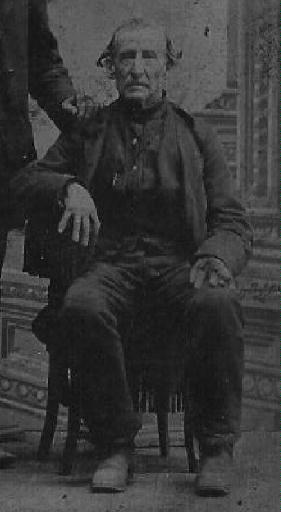
- Dillard Cooper in his elder years
- Born: 1814; South Carolina
- Died: 1896 (aged 81-82); Llano County, Texas
- Burial place: Llano City Cemetery, Llano, Texas
- Spouse(s): Lucinda; Elizabeth E. Gholson; Amanda Talk
- Children: 5
- Military career
- Allegiance: Republic of Texas
- Branch: Texian Army
- Service years: 1835-1836
- Unit: Alabama Red Rovers
- Conflicts: Texas Revolution • Battle of Coleto Creek • Goliad massacre

Dillard Cooper (1814-1896) was an American farmer and Texas Revolutionary soldier who survived the Goliad massacre. Born in South Carolina, Cooper married his first wife, Lucinda, and moved first to Tennessee and then to Courtland, Alabama.

In November 1835, Cooper joined Courtland doctor Jack Shackelford's Alabama Red Rovers, a filibuster force raised to support Texas' effort to secede from Mexico Cooper remained in camp with the Rovers until December 12, 1835 when the unit set out for Texas, stopping first in New Orleans and arriving at Dimmit's Landing on Lavaca Bay on January 19, 1836. From there, the Red Rovers joined James Fannin's command and on March 19–20, fought in the Battle of Coleto Creek where Cooper suffered minor wounds. The Texians had been caught on open prairie and, after Mexicans reinforcements arrived on the second day, were overwhelmed and forced to surrender. Mexican president Antonio López de Santa Anna had ordered General José de Urrea to treat the rebellious Texians as pirates instead of soldiers and to have them executed in accordance with the law rather than kept as prisoners of war.

On March 27, Cooper survived the massacre of 425 men at Goliad, running away as the bodies of his companions fell. Cooper soon linked up with three other surviving members of Red Rovers, Zachariah S. Brooks, Wilson Simpson, and Isaac D. Hamilton. Cooper and the others traveled by night, narrowly avoiding detection and recapture, sometimes by only a few feet. After a two week journey, moving from one abandoned village to the next in search of food and forced to abandon Hamilton, due to his wounds, Cooper and the other two Red Rovers finally linked back up with Texian forces at the Brazos River. Hamilton would ultimately survive after being recaptured and again escaping.

Cooper was granted land by the Republic of Texas for his service and farmed until his death. He married three times, was twice a widower, and fathered 5 children, all with his first wife. Cooper lived in Colorado and Hays Counties before finally moving to his son-in-law's farm in Llano County. At least one source claims that when he died in 1896, he was the last living survivor of the Goliad Massacre. The same source claims that near the end of his life Cooper was living on a "pitiful pension" of $150 a year from the state of Texas leaving him in poverty.

Cooper is buried in the Llano City Cemetery in Llano, Texas. In 2008, the State of Texas installed a historical marker at his grave site.
