= Courtland Historic District =

Historic district in Alabama, United States

- U.S. National Register of Historic Places
- U.S. Historic district
- Alabama Register of Landmarks and Heritage
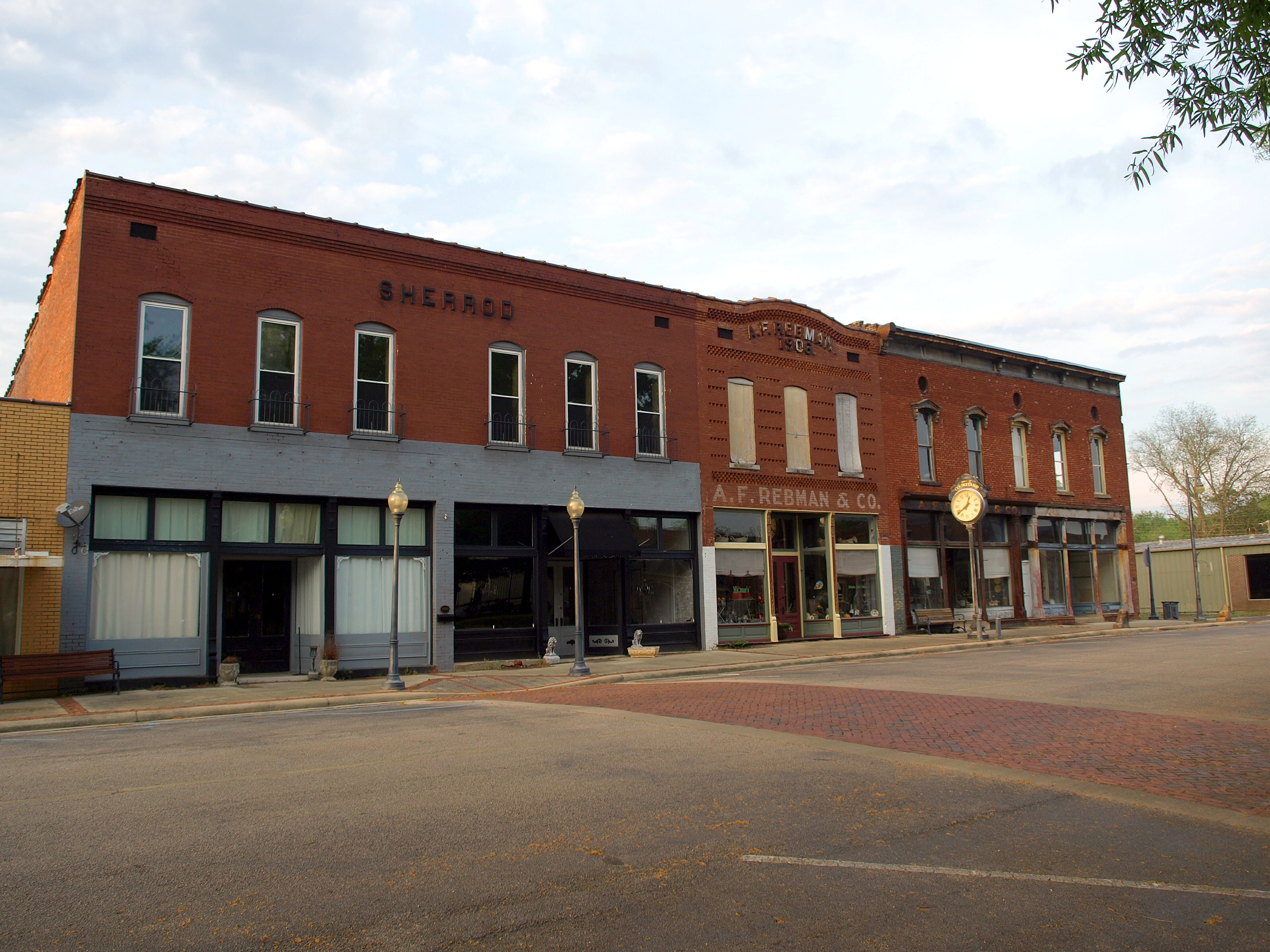
- Buildings on Tennessee St. in April 2017

- Location within Alabama Location within the United States
- Location: Roughly bounded by Clinton, Madison, Van Buren, Jefferson, Ussery, Tennessee, Monroe and Academy Sts., Courtland, Alabama
- Coordinates: 34°40′3″N 87°18′34″W
- Area: 100 acres (40 ha)
- Architectural style: Colonial Revival, Bungalow/Craftsman, Modern Movement
- NRHP reference No.: 91000597 (original); 98000710 (increase)

Significant dates
- Added to NRHP: May 13, 1991
- Boundary increase: June 26, 1998
- Designated ARLH: December 15, 1989

The Courtland Historic District is a historic district in Courtland, Alabama. Courtland was founded in 1818 and incorporated the following year. Its location was chosen to be close to the Tennessee River to facilitate transportation, but also close to cotton plantations to the south. The town's founders envisioned becoming the county seat of the newly formed Lawrence County, but the title instead went to Moulton. Many of the earliest structures in Courtland were built of logs, and were later replaced with frame and brick buildings. Development plateaued by 1830, but received a slight bump from the Tuscumbia, Courtland and Decatur Railroad beginning in 1834. The oldest houses in the district date from this era, including the 1828 Federal-style John McMahon House and several I-houses.

The town saw a resurgence after the Civil War, with early construction including the Presbyterian church. Most of the commercial area around the public square was rebuilt in brick in the 1880s through the 1900s, while many older houses were replaced with Victorian examples around the same time. The Southern Railway built a depot in 1887 to replace the previous depot; it was converted to a library around 1980. In the 1920s, larger, older lots began to be subdivided and more modest bungalows were constructed.

The district was listed on the Alabama Register of Landmarks and Heritage in 1989 and the National Register of Historic Places in 1991. The boundaries of the district were increased in 1998 to include buildings representing Courtland's working-class and post-World War II growth.
