= Isaac D. Hamilton =

Texas revolutionary soldier

Isaac D. Hamilton (1804–1859) was a Texas Revolutionary soldier and survivor of the Goliad Massacre. A native of Alabama, Hamilton joined Dr. Jack Shackelford's Red Rovers in 1835 and fought in the Battle of Coleto where he was badly wounded. Hamilton escaped the massacre of 425 men on March 27, 1836, along with three other members of the Red Rovers, including Dillard Cooper. Hamilton's wounds made travel painful and slow and, at his own insistence, the other three left him behind. Hamilton was recaptured and was in transit to be executed when two Mexican women helped him make his escape. He linked back up with Texian forces and eventually made his way back to Alabama.

Hamilton would spend the next two decades attempting to gain title to a league of land (4,428.4 acres) that had been promised Texas Revolutionaries for their service, first from the Republic of Texas then from the State of Texas. Hamilton was finally granted land near present-day Beaumont but, having never recovered fully from his wounds, died after making the trip to Texas before the land could even be surveyed.
