= Red Rovers =

- Red banner that served as the company guidon.
- Active: 1835-1836
- Allegiance: Republic of Texas
- Branch: Texian Army
- Type: volunteer
- Size: 60-70 men
- Engagements: Texas Revolution: Battle of Coleto

Commanders
- Notable commanders: James Fannin; Jack Shackelford

The Red Rovers, commonly referred to as the Alabama Red Rovers, was a military volunteer company organized in Courtland, Alabama to support the Texas Revolution.

== Background ==
Raised by doctor and planter Jack Shackelford in November 1835, the unit took its name from the red jeans of their uniforms and was outfitted with equipment from Alabama state arsenal. Consisting of some 70 men, nearly half the men in Courtland, the unit remained encamped until December 12 before setting out for Texas by way of New Orleans. After arriving at Lavaca Bay on January 19, 1836, and being accepted into Texas service on February 3, the Red Rovers were put under command of Colonel James W. Fannin. They fought in the Battle of Coleto on March 19–20, performing well, but the Texians were overrun and ultimately forced to surrender.

=== Goliad Massacre ===
The Red Rovers are primarily commemorated for their tragic role as victims of the Goliad Massacre. In this devastating event, a substantial majority of the band, as well as approximately 400 men of the Texan army, met their demise following an order issued by Mexican President Antonio Lopez de Santa Anna which ordered General José de Urrea to execute any Texan he came across. As a result, the majority of the Red Rovers, including two of Shackelford's sons, were killed in the Goliad massacre on March 27, 1836, along with hundreds of others. Shackelford himself was spared execution since his skills as a doctor could be used to treat Mexican soldiers. He would ultimately be released and return to Alabama, where he was thought dead. Four of the men, Zachariah S. Brooks, Dillard Cooper, Isaac D. Hamilton, and Wilson Simpson, escaped the slaughter. The four men traveled together at night to avoid capture and eventually found their way to other Texas forces and safety.

=== See also ===
- Foote, H. S., & Harris, J. (1987). Alabama Heritage Issue 5, Summer 1987. Alabama Heritage.
- John Crittenden Duval, Early Times in Texas, or the Adventures of Jack Dobell, Lincoln: University of Nebraska Press, 1986.
