= Senator Shackelford =

Senator Shackelford may refer to:

- Jack Shackelford (1790–1857), Alabama State Senate
- John Williams Shackelford (1844–1883), North Carolina State Senate
