= George K. Teulon =

English–Texian journalist and freemason

George Knight Teulon
- Born: May 27, 1812; England
- Died: 1846 (aged 33) Calcutta, British India
- Allegiance: Republic of Texas
- Branch: Texian Army
- Conflicts: Texas Revolution

George Knight Teulon (May 27, 1812 – 1846) was a 19th-century English-Texian journalist and freemason who was a cofounder and the editor of The Austin City Gazette, the first newspaper published in Austin, the capital of the Republic of Texas, and the publisher of The Western Advocate.

== Life ==
George Knight Teulon was born on May 27, 1812, as the tenth child of eleven children born to Thomas Anthony Teulon and Rachel (née Hensman) Teulon. The August 21, 1834, issue of the Montreal Herald and Daily Commercial Gazette contains a notice from August 13, 1834, for those who were indebted to the estate of P. H. Teulon, to make payment to George K. Teulon, or the executor of the estate before the accounts were to be transferred to an attorney. Peter Hensman Teulon was a brother of George K. Teulon and died in 1834. George K. Teulon signed a loyalist invitation in 1834, before the Lower Canada Rebellion began. Teulon served in the Texian Army in the Texas Revolution. He was a cofounder of The Austin City Gazette when it was established in 1839 and became the editor in January 1840. Before his editorship, the paper supported the policies of Mirabeau B. Lamar. Afterwards, it became Anti-Lamar and supported Sam Houston. In the third volume of The Writings of Sam Houston 1813–1863, the newspaper is mentioned as "an Anti-Houston, and anti-administration paper". The newspaper was the publisher to the Congress of the Republic of Texas and about half of the paper concerned the acts of Congress, presidential decrees, and other government matters. He was one of the first members of the Austin Lyceum, which was incorporated by the Congress of the Republic of Texas on February 4, 1841, "for the encouragement of literary and scientific pursuits".

Teulon sent gifts to Sam Houston and Margaret Lea Houston in 1842, which he described as "a musical magazine and 'Ladies Companion' packet workbox". In a November 30, 1842, issue of the Edgefield Advertiser, the second page includes an announcement from Teulon that a William P. Lewis, who formerly lived in Austin, was forever expelled from all the privileges and benefits of masonry due to unmasonic conduct and mentions Teulon as holding the position of King, High Priest p. t. of Lone Star Royal Arch Chapter No. 4.

On March 31, 1843, U.S. congressman and former U.S. President John Quincy Adams inscribed in his diary,

Western Advocate by George K. Teulon— N. 1 City of Austin Saturday 18 Feby 1843—

The Western Advocate, which Teulon was the publisher of, operated from February 1843 to 1844.

On June 17, 1843, Teulon invited the former president of the Republic of Texas, Mirabeau B. Lamar, to a public barbecue in Austin upon his return to the Republic of Texas.

The coat of arms of the Republic of Texas

In 1844, Teulon, then the Grand Secretary of the Grand Lodge of the Republic of Texas when John Alexander Greer was the Grand Master, addressed a meeting of freemasons in Portland, Maine, and made remarks about masonic symbolism in Texas's chosen symbol, the "Lone Star". He told attendees, "Texas is emphatically a Masonic Country: Our national emblem, the 'Lone Star', was chosen from among the emblems selected by Freemasonry, to illustrate the moral virtues — it is a five-pointed star, and alludes to the five points of fellowship."

Also in 1844, Teulon wrote in The Freemason's Monthly Magazine that "Texas is emphatically a Masonic Country; all of our Presidents and Vice-President, and four-fifths of our State Officers were and are Masons: by Freemasonry to illustrate the moral virtues--it is a Five Pointed Star ... May it ever bind us in the holy Bond of Fraternal Union and govern our social, Masonic, and Political intercourse".

Teulon was sent by the Grand Lodge of Texas as its representative to the Grand Lodge of England. He later resigned this post and lived for some months in Boston, Massachusetts, but was unsuccessful in finding suitable work. He then moved to Calcutta and worked for the General Post Office.

== Death ==
Volume VI of The Freemason's Monthly Magazine records Teulon as dying in Calcutta, British India, in March 1846. An English genealogical book from 1908 mentions that he died in Calcutta on April 24, 1846.

George Fleming Moore, who at the time of the 1874 Supreme Court of Texas case The State v. Estate of George K. Teulon was an associate justice of the Supreme Court of Texas, wrote Teulon was "averred" to have "died in Brazil without having sold or transferred said property".

John Henry Brown, in his History of Texas, from 1685 to 1892, published in 1893, wrote that Teulon died in Hong Kong.
