= Benjamin Franklin Bryant =

- Born: 15 March 1800; Wilkes County, Georgia
- Died: 4 March 1857 (aged 56); Bryant Station, Milam County, Texas
- Burial place: Bryant Station, Texas (1857–1931); Austin, Texas (1931–present)
- Military career
- Allegiance: Republic of Texas
- Branch: Army
- Service years: 1936-
- Rank: Captain
- Units: Texian Army (1836); Army of the Republic of Texas (1836-1839)
- Conflicts: Battle of San Jacinto
- Other work: Indian Agent (1840); Texas Ranger(1841-1845)

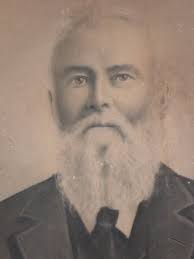
Captain Benjamin Franklin Bryant

Benjamin Franklin Bryant (15 March 1800 – 4 March 1857) was a military officer noted for his service to in the Texian Army at the Battle of San Jacinto, and later in the Army of the Republic of Texas. Bryant founded the frontier fort Bryant Station and was personally recognized by Sam Houston and the Texas Legislature. The legislature voted in 1931 to relocate his grave to the Texas State Cemetery due to his notable place in Texas history.

== Early life and career ==
Bryant was born in Wilkes County, Georgia, and spent his childhood in Macon County. He married Roxanna Price and also maintained a relationship with Rebecca Parker. After a 1929 petition to the state of Georgia to legitimize his children with Rebecca Parker, the scandal of the openly adulterous relationship led to Bryant, Roxanna, and Rebecca, along with their children and a nephew, to leave for Texas, where the extended family settled-in near the Palo Gacho Bayou.

== Battle of San Jacinto ==
In March 1836, Bryant, now captain of a recruited company of volunteers joined up with other units from the Texian Army at Bernardo Plantation, former home of Jared Groce, a wealthy Texas farmer. In June 1836, Bryant was issued Donation Certificate No. 314 for 640 acres of land for fighting on behalf of Texas at the Battle of San Jacinto. Though retired from military service in 1836, Bryant established and led Bryant Station a frontier fort on Little River. Bryant Station became a Headquarters for Indian fighters.

== Later life ==
On 16 March 1839, Bryant commanded an engagement of 52 fighters against a group of natives at the falls of the Brazos, near the present city of Marlin. The engagement did not go well, with 18 killed or wounded, and they are reported to have retreated "in disorder."

In 1845, Bryant built a new home near the fort for the extended family. He died at that home on 4 March 1857. The remains of Bryant and his legal wife Roxanna were removed by the State of Texas to the State Cemetery at Austin in 1931, in recognition of Bryant's significance in Texas history.
