= Bryant Station, Texas =

Coordinates: 30.849°N 97.194°W

Bryant Station is a ghost town in Milam County, Texas, United States, located 12 miles west of Cameron on the Little River.

== History ==
In the 1840s, Benjamin F. Bryant built a fort at the location to defend settlers against Indians. The school consolidated with Buckholts in 1941, and Bryant Station eventually was abandoned. Today, the cemeteries, the Bryant Station Bridge built in 1909, and a historical marker are all that remain. The historical marker is located a few miles outside of Buckholts.
