= Bibliography of the Texas Revolution, Republic, and Annexation =

Texas Revolution
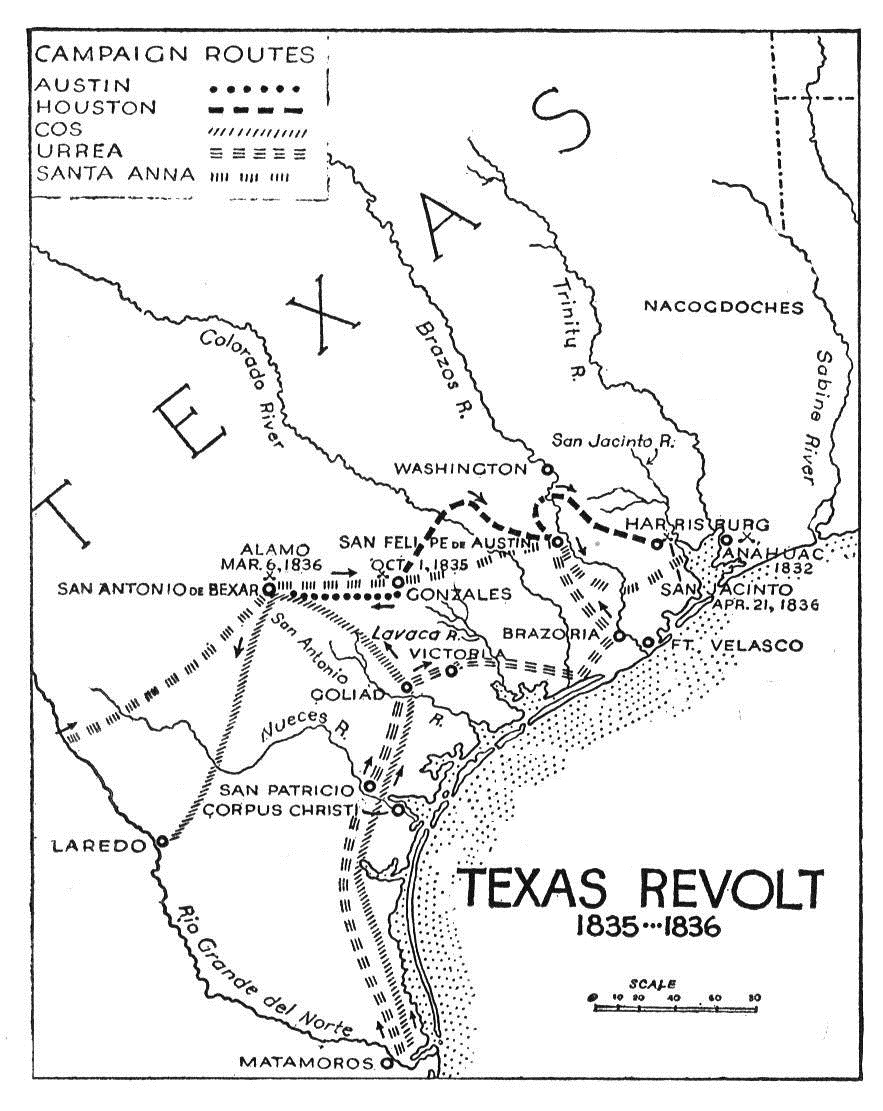
- The campaigns of the Texas Revolution
Date	October 2, 1835 – April 21, 1836
Location	Texas
Result	Texian victory
Territorial changes	De facto Texian independence from the Centralist Republic of Mexico

Belligerents
Republic of Texas	Mexican Republic

Commanders and leaders
Sam Houston (WIA); James Fannin (executed); William Travis †; James Bowie †; Davy Crockett †; Frank W. Johnson; Edward Burleson	Antonio López de Santa Anna (POW); Vicente Filísola; Martín Perfecto de Cos (POW)

Strength
c. 2,000	c. 6,500

Casualties and losses
600 killed; 350 wounded	1,000 dead; 400 wounded

Republic of Texas República de Tejas (Spanish)
- 1836–1846
- Motto: "Remember the Alamo"
- Map of the Republic of Texas. Since the Republic was not recognized by Mexico, its entire territory was disputed. The area that was controlled by the Republic is in dark green, while the territory claimed by the Republic but not effectively controlled is in light green.
- Capital: San Antonio de Bexar (Mexican Texas); San Felipe de Austin (1835, provisional); Washington-on-the-Brazos (1836, interim); Harrisburg (1836, interim); Galveston (1836, interim); Velasco (1836, interim); Columbia (1836–1837); Houston (1837–1839); Austin (1839–1846)
- Demonyms: Texian and Tejano
- Government: Unitary presidential republic
- President
  - 1836: David G. Burnet
  - 1836–1838: Sam Houston, 1st term
  - 1838–1841: Mirabeau B. Lamar
  - 1841–1844: Sam Houston, 2nd term
  - 1844–1846: Anson Jones
- Vice President
  - 1836: Lorenzo de Zavala
  - 1836–1838: Mirabeau B. Lamar
  - 1838–1841: David G. Burnet
  - 1841–1844: Edward Burleson
  - 1844–1845: Kenneth L. Anderson
- Legislature: Congress
  - Upper house: Senate
  - Lower house: House of Representatives
- Historical era: Western Expansion
  - Independence from Mexico: March 2, 1836
  - Transfer of power: February 19, 1846
- Currency: Texas dollar

Texas annexation
- Date: 1 March 1845 – 19 February 1846
- Location: Washington, D.C. and Austin, Texas
- Type: Territorial annexation
- Participants: John Tyler; James K. Polk; Anson Jones; J. Pinckney Henderson
- Outcome: Texas admitted as the 28th state of the United States
- Joint resolution: passed the House 25 January 1845; passed the Senate 27–25 on 27 February 1845; House adopted the Senate version 132–76 on 28 February 1845; signed by President Tyler 1 March 1845. Texas acceptance: Texas Congress accepted 16 June 1845; the annexation convention accepted 4 July 1845; the ordinance and state constitution were submitted to voters 13 October 1845. Admission: House 141–58 on 16 December 1845; Senate 31–14 on 22 December 1845; signed by President Polk 29 December 1845. Transfer of government: 19 February 1846, when Governor J. Pinckney Henderson took the oath of office.

This is a select bibliography of academic level books and journal articles, published mainly after World War II, (Note: Works published during or before World War II should be limited to areas where there are no significant post-World War II books on the subject or when the work in question has significant historical merit.) about the history of the Texas Revolution, Republic, and Annexation to the United States and its historical context.

The Texas Revolution (October 2, 1835 – April 21, 1836) was a rebellion by Anglo-American immigrants as well as Hispanic Texans (known as Texians and Tejanos respectively) against the centralist government of Mexico in the Mexican state of Coahuila y Tejas. Although the uprising was part of a larger revolt that included other provinces opposed to the regime of President Miguel Barragán and General Antonio López de Santa Anna, the Mexican government believed the United States had instigated the Texas insurrection with the goal of annexation. The Mexican Congress passed the Tornel Decree, declaring that any foreigners fighting against Mexican troops "will be deemed pirates and dealt with as such, being citizens of no nation presently at war with the Republic and fighting under no recognized flag". Only the province of Texas succeeded in breaking with Mexico, establishing the Republic of Texas. It was eventually annexed by the United States about a decade later.

The Republic of Texas (Spanish: República de Tejas), or simply Texas, was a short-lived sovereign country in North America from March 2, 1836, to February 19, 1846. Texas was bordered by Mexico to the west and southwest, the Gulf of Mexico to the southeast, the two U.S. states of Louisiana and Arkansas to the east and northeast, and U.S. unorganized territory encompassing parts of the current U.S. states of Oklahoma, Kansas, Colorado, and Wyoming to the north. The Texas Revolution began when hostilities broke out on October 2, 1835, shortly before the regime of Mexican President and General Antonio López de Santa Anna adopted a new Mexican constitution known as the Siete Leyes that abolished the authority of the states under the federal republic and established a centralized government. The revolution lasted for over six months. On March 2, 1836, delegates in convention proclaimed the Texas Declaration of Independence. Major fighting ended on April 21, 1836, with the Treaties of Velasco that ended the fighting and secured Texas' independence.

The Texas annexation was the incorporation of the Republic of Texas into the United States by joint resolution of Congress, culminating in its admission to the Union as the 28th state on December 29, 1845.

Works listed here are cited in the notes or bibliographies of scholarly sources. Each is published by an academic or major press, written by a recognized expert, or substantially reviewed in scholarly journals; borderline cases are omitted. A selection of primary sources are included. Many of the books below carry their own bibliographies; see the Further reading section for other bibliographies, and the External links section for historical sites, academic sites, and museums.

Citations follow APA style. (Note: Entries are in plain text APA 7 format without templates; templates are used only for reviews and notes.) Book have citations to academic journal or mainstream published reviews when available. For books only partly about the subject, relevant chapter or section titles are provided when useful and available. Translators of the original-language edition are included when possible. In cases where a title or name has appeared with more than one English spelling, the most recent published form is used and a footnote documents any earlier title under which the work appeared.

== General surveys ==
- Brands, H. W. (2018). Heirs of the founders: The epic rivalry of Henry Clay, John Calhoun and Daniel Webster, the second generation of American giants. Doubleday. Part 5, "Temptations of empire," covers Texas annexation and the sectional crisis it opened.
- Campbell, R. B. (2003). Gone to Texas: A history of the Lone Star State. Oxford University Press.
- Harrigan, S. (2019). Big wonderful thing: A history of Texas. University of Texas Press.
- Howe, D. W. (2007). What hath God wrought: The transformation of America, 1815–1848. Oxford University Press. Chapter 17, "Texas, Tyler, and the Telegraph," covers annexation; chapter 18, "Westward the Star of Empire," and chapter 19, "The War Against Mexico," carry the story forward.
- Johnson, B. H. (2025). Texas: An American history. Yale University Press.
- McComb, D. G. (2010). Texas: A modern history (Rev. ed.). University of Texas Press.
- Merry, R. W. (2009). A country of vast designs: James K. Polk, the Mexican War, and the conquest of the American continent. Simon & Schuster. Chapters "Texas: Dawn of a new era" and "Annexation complete: Diplomacy, intrigue, and the force of politics" treat the annexation crisis.
- Montejano, D. (1987). Anglos and Mexicans in the making of Texas, 1836–1986. University of Texas Press.

== The Texas Revolution ==
- Barker, E. C. (1904). The finances of the Texas Revolution. Political Science Quarterly, 19(4), 612–635. JSTOR 2140324
- Barker, E. C. (1906). Land speculation as a cause of the Texas Revolution. Quarterly of the Texas State Historical Association, 10(1), 76–95.
- Barker, E. C. (1907). President Jackson and the Texas Revolution. American Historical Review, 12(4), 788–809. JSTOR 1839188
- Barker, E. C. (1910). Stephen F. Austin and the independence of Texas. Quarterly of the Texas State Historical Association, 13(4), 257–284.
- Barker, E. C. (1914). The United States and Mexico, 1835–1837. Mississippi Valley Historical Review, 1(1), 3–30. JSTOR 1896937
- Barker, E. C. (1928). Mexico and Texas, 1821–1835. P. L. Turner.
- Barr, A. (1990). Texans in revolt: The battle for San Antonio, 1835. University of Texas Press.
- Brands, H. W. (2004). Lone Star nation: How a ragged army of volunteers won the battle for Texas independence. Doubleday.
- Davis, W. C. (2004). Lone Star rising: The revolutionary birth of the Texas Republic. Free Press.
- de la Teja, J. F. (Ed.). (2010). Tejano leadership in Mexican and revolutionary Texas. Texas A&M University Press.
- Donovan, J. (2012). The blood of heroes: The 13-day struggle for the Alamo and the sacrifice that forged a nation. Little, Brown.
- Dunn, J. D. (2011). Mapping San Jacinto battleground, 1836–1855. Southwestern Historical Quarterly, 114(4), 388–424. doi:10.1353/swh.2011.0031
- Hardin, S. L. (1994). Texian Iliad: A military history of the Texas Revolution, 1835–1836. University of Texas Press.
- Lack, P. D. (1985). Slavery and the Texas Revolution. Southwestern Historical Quarterly, 89(2), 181–202.
- Lack, P. D. (1992). The Texas revolutionary experience: A political and social history, 1835–1836. Texas A&M University Press.
- Leazes, F. J. (2023). A portrait of Amos Pollard: The doctor at the Alamo. Southwestern Historical Quarterly, 126(4), 438–465. doi:10.1353/swh.2023.0027
- Pohl, J. W. (1989). The battle of San Jacinto. Texas State Historical Association.
- Pomeroy, C. D. (2009). Reassessing the location of Vince's bridge: Critical prelude to the Battle of San Jacinto. Southwestern Historical Quarterly, 112(4), 410–427. doi:10.1353/swh.2009.0065
- Reichstein, A. (1989). Rise of the Lone Star: The making of Texas. Texas A&M University Press.
- Reid, S. (2007). The secret war for Texas. Texas A&M University Press.
- Reyes, S. R. (2024). The ideological origins of the Texas Revolution. Journal of Southern History, 90(3), 479–502. doi:10.1353/soh.2024.a932552
- Roberts, R., & Olson, J. S. (2001). A line in the sand: The Alamo in blood and memory. Free Press.
- Roell, C. H. (2013). Matamoros and the Texas Revolution. Texas State Historical Association.
- Scheer, M. L. (Ed.). (2012). Women and the Texas Revolution. University of North Texas Press.
- Stout, J. A. (2008). Slaughter at Goliad: The Mexican massacre of 400 Texas volunteers. Naval Institute Press.
- Tolbert, F. X. (1959). The day of San Jacinto. McGraw-Hill.
- Winders, R. B. (2004). Sacrificed at the Alamo: Tragedy and triumph in the Texas Revolution. State House Press.
- Winders, R. B. (2017). "This is a cruel truth, but I cannot omit it": The origin and effect of Mexico's no quarter policy in the Texas Revolution. Southwestern Historical Quarterly, 120(4), 412–439. doi:10.1353/swh.2017.0000

== The Republic of Texas ==
- Adams, E. D. (1910). British interests and activities in Texas, 1838–1846. Johns Hopkins Press.
- Nance, J. M. (1963). After San Jacinto: The Texas–Mexican frontier, 1836–1841. University of Texas Press.
- Nance, J. M. (1964). Attack and counterattack: The Texas–Mexican frontier, 1842. University of Texas Press.
- Siegel, S. (1956). A political history of the Texas Republic, 1836–1845. University of Texas Press.
- Vázquez, J. Z. (1986). The Texas question in Mexican politics, 1836–1845. Southwestern Historical Quarterly, 89(3).

== Annexation to the United States ==
- Cash, J. T. (2024). Adding the Lone Star: John Tyler, Sam Houston, and the annexation of Texas. University Press of Kansas.
- Crapol, E. P. (1997). John Tyler and the pursuit of national destiny. Journal of the Early Republic, 17(3), 467–491. JSTOR 3123944
- Crapol, E. P. (2006). John Tyler, the accidental president. University of North Carolina Press.
- Freehling, W. W. (1990). The road to disunion: Vol. 1. Secessionists at bay, 1776–1854. Oxford University Press.
- Haynes, S. W. (2010). Unfinished revolution: The early American republic in a British world. University of Virginia Press.
- Haynes, S. W., & Morris, C. (Eds.). (1997). Manifest Destiny and empire: American antebellum expansionism. Texas A&M University Press.
- Merk, F. (1972). Slavery and the annexation of Texas. Alfred A. Knopf.
- Morrison, M. A. (1990). Westward the curse of empire: Texas annexation and the American Whig Party. Journal of the Early Republic, 10(2), 221–249. JSTOR 3123558
- Morrison, M. A. (1995). Martin Van Buren, the Democracy, and the partisan politics of Texas annexation. Journal of Southern History, 61(4), 695–724. JSTOR 2211431
- Morrison, M. A. (1997). Slavery and the American West: The eclipse of Manifest Destiny and the coming of the Civil War. University of North Carolina Press.
- Narrett, D. E. (1997). A choice of destiny: Immigration policy, slavery, and the annexation of Texas. Southwestern Historical Quarterly, 100(3), 271–302.
- Roeckell, L. M. (1999). Bonds over bondage: British opposition to the annexation of Texas. Journal of the Early Republic, 19(2), 257–278. JSTOR 3124954
- Rugemer, E. B. (2007). Robert Monroe Harrison, British abolition, southern Anglophobia and Texas annexation. Slavery & Abolition, 28(2), 169–191. doi:10.1080/01440390701428006
- Schroeder, J. H. (1985). Annexation or independence: The Texas issue in American politics, 1836–1845. Southwestern Historical Quarterly, 89(2), 137–164.
- Silbey, J. H. (2005). Storm over Texas: The annexation controversy and the road to Civil War. Oxford University Press.
- Smith, J. H. (1911). The annexation of Texas. Baker & Taylor.
- Sturdevant, P. E. (2005). Robert John Walker and Texas annexation: A lost champion. Southwestern Historical Quarterly, 109(2), 188–202.
- Volanto, K. J., & Preuss, G. B. (2019). When was the Republic of Texas no more?: Revisiting the annexation of Texas. Southwestern Historical Quarterly, 123(1), 30–59. doi:10.1353/swh.2019.0050

== Topical works ==
- Anderson, G. C. (2005). The conquest of Texas: Ethnic cleansing in the promised land, 1820–1875. University of Oklahoma Press.
- Barker, E. C. (1924). The influence of slavery in the colonization of Texas. Mississippi Valley Historical Review, 11(1), 3. JSTOR 1891925
- Barr, A. (1996). Black Texans: A history of African Americans in Texas, 1528–1995. University of Oklahoma Press.
- Campbell, R. B. (1989). An empire for slavery: The peculiar institution in Texas, 1821–1865. Louisiana State University Press.
- Carrigan, W. D. (1999). Slavery on the frontier: The peculiar institution in Central Texas. Slavery & Abolition, 20(2), 63–96. doi:10.1080/01440399908575278
- de la Teja, J. F. (1998). Discovering the Tejano community in "Early" Texas. Journal of the Early Republic, 18(1), 73–98. JSTOR 3124734
- de la Teja, J. F. (2024). Slavery and antislavery in the Hispanic world and Texas, 1789–1827. Southwestern Historical Quarterly, 128(2), 114–142. doi:10.1353/swh.2024.a944619
- de la Teja, J. F., & Wheat, J. (1985). Bexar: Profile of a Tejano community, 1820–1832. Southwestern Historical Quarterly, 89(1), 7–34.
- DePalo, W. A., Jr. (1997). The Mexican national army, 1822–1852. Texas A&M University Press.
- Hämäläinen, P. (2008). The Comanche empire. Yale University Press.
- Kelley, S. M. (2004). "Mexico in his head": Slavery and the Texas–Mexico border, 1810–1860. Journal of Social History, 37(3), 709–723. doi:10.1353/jsh.2004.0010
- McFarlane, W. S. (2021). The wet frontier of slavery: Plantation slavery and freedom on Texas' Trinity River. Slavery & Abolition, 42(4), 733–754. doi:10.1080/0144039x.2021.1887705
- Poyo, G. E. (Ed.). (1996). Tejano journey, 1770–1850. University of Texas Press.
- Reséndez, A. (1999). National identity on a shifting border: Texas and New Mexico in the age of transition, 1821–1848. Journal of American History, 86(2), 668–688. JSTOR 2567051
- Reséndez, A. (2005). Changing national identities at the frontier: Texas and New Mexico, 1800–1850. Cambridge University Press.
- Shelton, R. S. (2007). Slavery in a Texas seaport: The peculiar institution in Galveston. Slavery & Abolition, 28(2), 155–168. doi:10.1080/01440390701427990
- Torget, A. J. (2015). Seeds of empire: Cotton, slavery, and the transformation of the Texas borderlands, 1800–1850. University of North Carolina Press.

== Historiography and memory ==
- Brear, H. B. (1994). Inherit the Alamo: Myth and ritual at an American shrine. University of Texas Press.
- Buenger, W. L. (2002). "The story of Texas"? The Texas State History Museum and forgetting and remembering the past. Southwestern Historical Quarterly, 105(3), 480–493.
- Buenger, W. L. (2017). Making sense of Texas and its history. Southwestern Historical Quarterly, 121(1), 1–26. doi:10.1353/swh.2017.0027
- Buenger, W. L., & Calvert, R. A. (Eds.). (1991). Texas through time: Evolving interpretations. Texas A&M University Press.
- Buenger, W. L., & De León, A. (Eds.). (2011). Beyond Texas through time: Breaking away from past interpretations. Texas A&M University Press.
- Cantrell, G. (2004). The bones of Stephen F. Austin: History and memory in Progressive-Era Texas. Southwestern Historical Quarterly, 108, 145–178.
- Crisp, J. E. (1994). The little book that wasn't there: The myth and mystery of the de la Peña diary. Southwestern Historical Quarterly, 98(2), 261–296.
- Crisp, J. E. (2005). Sleuthing the Alamo: Davy Crockett's last stand and other mysteries of the Texas Revolution. Oxford University Press.
- Crisp, J. E. (2022). Coming to terms with the Texas Revolution in the pages of the Southwestern Historical Quarterly. Southwestern Historical Quarterly, 125(4), 442–458. doi:10.1353/swh.2022.0031
- De León, A. (2022). Tejano history in the Southwestern Historical Quarterly. Southwestern Historical Quarterly, 125(4), 428–441. doi:10.1353/swh.2022.0030
- Flores, R. R. (1998). Memory-place, meaning, and the Alamo. American Literary History, 10(3), 428–445. doi:10.1093/alh/10.3.428
- Flores, R. R. (2002). Remembering the Alamo: Memory, modernity, and the master symbol. University of Texas Press.
- Gracy, D. B., II. (2001). "Just as I have written it": A study of the authenticity of the manuscript of José Enrique de la Peña's account of the Texas campaign. Southwestern Historical Quarterly, 105(2), 254–291.
- Graham, D. (1985). Remembering the Alamo: The story of the Texas Revolution in popular culture. Southwestern Historical Quarterly, 89(1), 35–66.
- Jones, N. B. (2016). Making Texas our Texas: The emergence of Texas women's history, 1976–1990. Southwestern Historical Quarterly, 120(3), 278–313. doi:10.1353/swh.2016.0084
- Jones, N. B. (2022). On presence and absence: Women's history in the Southwestern Historical Quarterly. Southwestern Historical Quarterly, 125(4), 370–392. doi:10.1353/swh.2022.0027
- Lang, A. F. (2010). Memory, the Texas Revolution, and secession: The birth of Confederate nationalism in the Lone Star State. Southwestern Historical Quarterly, 114(1), 21–36. doi:10.1353/swh.0.0016
- Poyo, G. E., & Hinojosa, G. M. (1988). Spanish Texas and borderlands historiography in transition: Implications for United States history. Journal of American History, 75(2), 393–416. JSTOR 1887864
- Salvucci, L. K. (2002). Everybody's Alamo: Revolution in the revolution, Texas style. Reviews in American History, 30(2), 236–244. doi:10.1353/rah.2002.0042
- Smith, F. T. (2010). Texas through 1845: A survey of the historical literature of recent decades. Southwestern Historical Quarterly, 113(3), 310–341. doi:10.1353/swh.2010.0079
- Smith, T. (2015). The U.S. Army and the Alamo, 1846–1877. Southwestern Historical Quarterly, 118(3), 263–286. doi:10.1353/swh.2015.0008
- Valerio-Jiménez, O. (2020). Refuting history fables: Collective memories, Mexican Texans, and Texas history. Southwestern Historical Quarterly, 123(4), 390–418. doi:10.1353/swh.2020.0024
- Valerio-Jiménez, O. (2022). Borderlands history in the Southwestern Historical Quarterly. Southwestern Historical Quarterly, 125(4), 408–426. doi:10.1353/swh.2022.0029
- Willingham, J. (2023). Should we "forget the Alamo"?: Myths, slavery, and the Texas Revolution. Southwestern Historical Quarterly, 126(4), 466–493. doi:10.1353/swh.2023.0028

== Primary sources ==
- Almonte, J. N. (2003). Almonte's Texas: Juan N. Almonte's 1834 inspection, secret report, and role in the 1836 campaign (J. Jackson, Ed.; J. Wheat, Trans.). Texas State Historical Association.
- Barker, E. C. (Ed.). (1924–1928). The Austin papers (Vols. 1–3). American Historical Association; University of Texas.
- Barker, N. N. (Ed. & Trans.). (1971–1973). The French legation in Texas (Vols. 1–2). Texas State Historical Association.
- de la Peña, J. E. (1975). With Santa Anna in Texas: A personal narrative of the revolution (C. Perry, Ed. & Trans.). Texas A&M University Press. (Original work published 1955)
- Dimmick, G. J. (2011). A newly uncovered Alamo account: By Pedro Ampudia, commanding general of the Mexican army over Texas artillery. Southwestern Historical Quarterly, 114(4), 379–386. doi:10.1353/swh.2011.0054
- Filisola, V. (1985–1987). Memoirs for the history of the war in Texas (W. Woolsey, Trans.; Vols. 1–2). Eakin Press. (Original work published 1848–1849)
- Garrison, G. P. (Ed.). (1908–1911). Diplomatic correspondence of the Republic of Texas (Vols. 1–3). Government Printing Office.
- Gulick, C. A., Jr., Elliott, K., Allen, W., & Smither, H. (Eds.). (1921–1927). The papers of Mirabeau Buonaparte Lamar (Vols. 1–6). A. C. Baldwin.
- Hansen, T. (Ed.). (2003). The Alamo reader: A study in history. Stackpole Books.
- Holley, M. A. (1836). Texas. J. Clarke.
- Jenkins, J. H. (Ed.). (1973). The papers of the Texas Revolution, 1835–1836. Presidial Press.
- Seguín, J. N. (1991). A revolution remembered: The memoirs and selected correspondence of Juan N. Seguín (J. F. de la Teja, Ed.). State House Press.
- Smithwick, N. (1900). The evolution of a state, or Recollections of old Texas days. Gammel Book Company.
- Williams, A. W., & Barker, E. C. (Eds.). (1938–1943). The writings of Sam Houston, 1813–1863 (Vols. 1–8). University of Texas Press.
- Winkler, E. W. (Ed.). (1911). Secret journals of the Senate, Republic of Texas, 1836–1845. Austin Printing Company.
- Zavala, L. de. (2005). Journey to the United States of North America / Viaje a los Estados Unidos del Norte de América (W. Woolsey, Trans.; J.-M. Rivera, Ed.). Arte Público Press. (Original work published 1834)

== See also ==
- Mexican Texas
- Texas Revolution
- Texas Declaration of Independence
- Battle of the Alamo
- Goliad massacre
- Battle of San Jacinto
- Republic of Texas
- Texas annexation
