= John McMahon House =

Historic house in Alabama, United States

- U.S. National Register of Historic Places
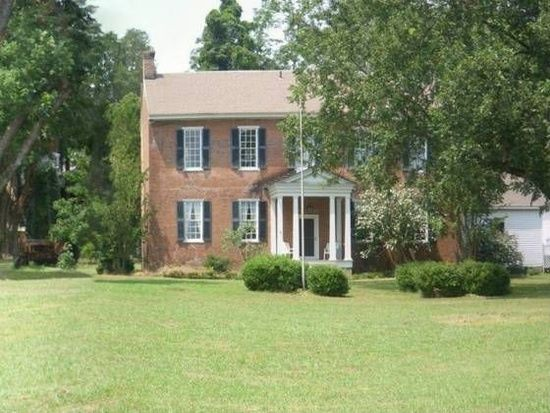
- The McMahon House in 2013

- Location within Alabama Location within the United States
- Location: Jct. South Lane and Jefferson Street; Courtland, Alabama
- Coordinates: 34°40′7″N 87°18′21″W
- Built: 1828
- Architectural style: Federal, I-house
- NRHP reference No.: 87001454
- Added to NRHP: December 11, 1987

The John McMahon House is a Federal style mansion located in Courtland, Alabama. It is listed on the National Register of Historic Places. The two-story brick I-house was built in 1828.

== History ==
The John McMahon House is named for its first documented owner, John McMahon. McMahon moved to Lawrence County from Virginia to manage the Courtland branch of the Huntsville mercantile firm of Bierne and McMahon. In August 1835, McMahon married Harriet Shackelford, daughter of Dr. Jack Shackelford.

Federal raiding parties during the Civil War used the house on several occasions as temporary headquarters. Some of the troops fired into the ceiling one evening, leaving a hole in the ceiling that existed for some time. The brass nameplate in the foyer is that of Dr. Jack McMahon. The home still has Civil War-era bullet holes, which someone had attempted to patch, visible around the front door.

The house was donated to the Alabama Historical Commission in 1987, and listed on the National Register of Historic Places in the same year.
