= The Western Advocate =

The Western Advocate was a newspaper published in Austin, Texas from February 1843 to February 1844. George K. Teulon was its publisher.
