= Courtland, Alabama =

- Town
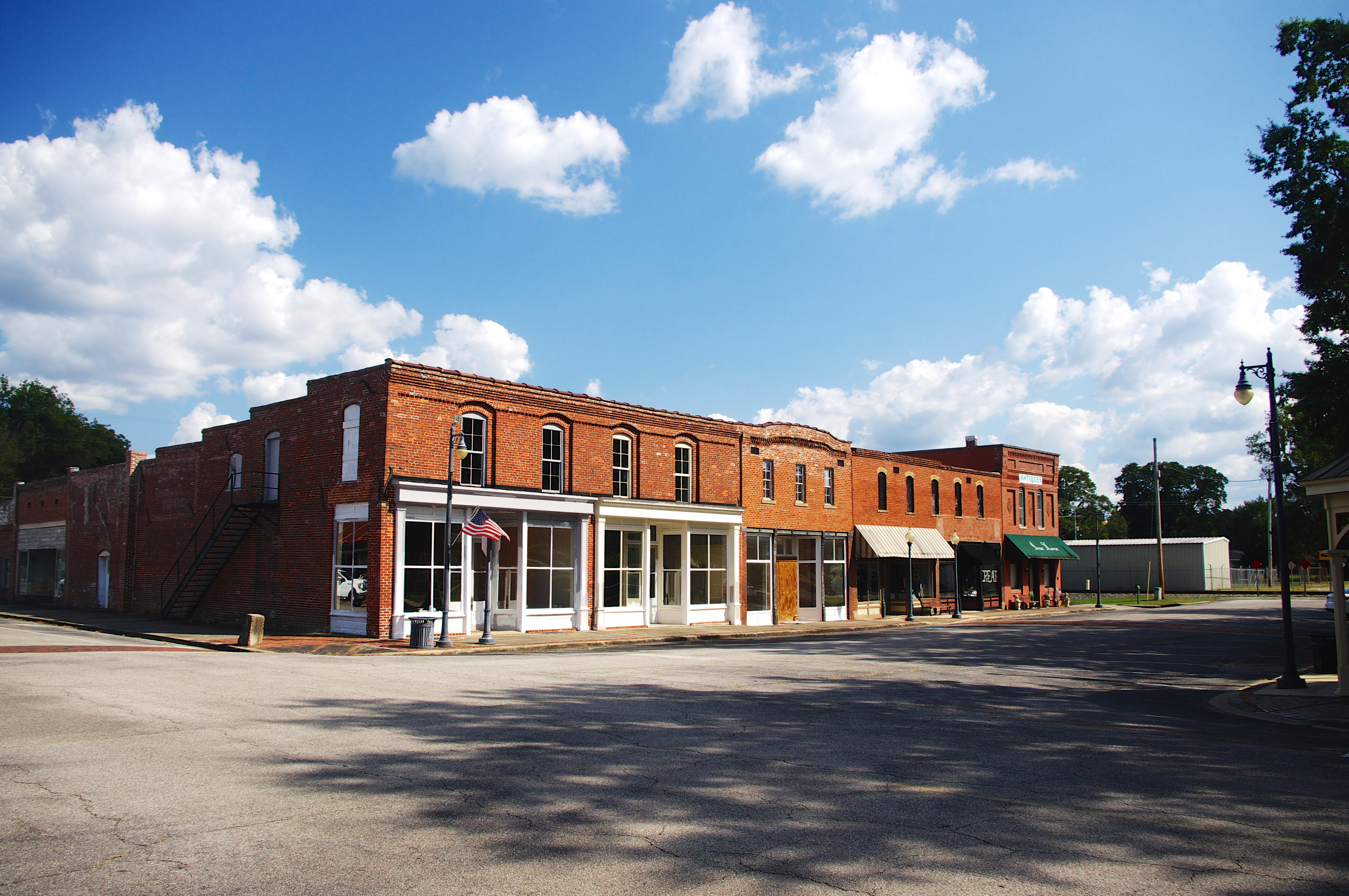
- Buildings along the Town Square (College Street)

- Logo

- Location of Courtland in Lawrence County, Alabama.
- Coordinates: 34°40′13″N 87°19′35″W
- Country: United States
- State: Alabama
- County: Lawrence
- Incorporated: December 13, 1819

Area
  - Total: 2.98 sq mi (7.71 km^{2})
  - Land: 2.95 sq mi (7.65 km^{2})
  - Water: 0.023 sq mi (0.06 km^{2})
- Elevation: 568 ft (173 m)

Population (2020)
  - Total: 583
  - Density: 197.5/sq mi (76.24/km^{2})
- Time zone: UTC-6 (Central (CST))
  - Summer (DST): UTC-5 (CDT)
- ZIP code: 35618
- Area code: 256
- FIPS code: 01-18040
- GNIS feature ID: 2406323
- Website: www.townofcourtland.org

Courtland is a town in Lawrence County, Alabama, United States, and is included in the Decatur Metropolitan Area, as well as the Huntsville-Decatur Combined Statistical Area. As of the 2020 census, Courtland had a population of 583.

== History ==
A small creek named Big Nance Creek runs through the town. The creek was named for a Cherokee chief who lived in the area when the first European settlers arrived. The current town is reportedly located on the site of the Native American village.

Courtland began as a small settlement known as Ebenezer in the early 1800s. Its early settlers were wealthy planters mostly from Virginia, Tennessee, the Carolinas and Georgia. It was presently named for the federal courthouse and land office there. In 1818, a group known as the Courtland Land Company bought the land on which the town is now situated and subdivided it into lots. The town was incorporated on December 13, 1819, by the Alabama territorial legislature

The early roads Gaines Trace and Byler Road went through town.

One of the South's earliest railroads, the Tuscumbia, Courtland and Decatur Railroad, was organized at Courtland in 1831, and chartered the following year. The railroad's organizers routed the 50-mile (80 km) railroad to bypass the dangerous shoals along the Tennessee River to the north. The railroad was absorbed by the Memphis and Charleston Railroad in the 1850s, and later became part of the Southern Railway.

In 1835, Courtland physician Jack Shackelford organized a volunteer military unit to fight in the Texas Revolution. Known as the "Red Rovers" for the color of their uniforms, the company was captured by Mexican forces at Coleto in March 1836, and most of its men were killed in the Goliad massacre. Shackelford was among the few survivors.

In 1944 and 1945, during World War II, Courtland was home to the Courtland Army Airfield (Courtland AAF). It was dismantled after the war and given to the city of Courtland, which now operates it as Courtland Airport.

=== Courtland Historic District ===
In the early 1990s, more than 100 buildings in Courtland were listed on the National Register of Historic Places as the Courtland Historic District. Most of the buildings in the district date from the 1830s through the 1930s, and architectural styles include Federal, Italianate, Victorian, Colonial Revival, and Neoclassical. The Town Square was part of the town's original 1818-1819 plan. Many of the commercial buildings facing the square, especially along College Street and Tennessee Street, were built in the 1890s and early 1900s. The train depot on the south side of the square, now a community center, was built in the late 1880s. The Old Sherrod Hotel, located at the northwest corner of Tennessee Street and Alabama Street, was built around 1930, and provided housing for early Tennessee Valley Authority employees.

The John McMahon House, a Federal-style home built around 1830, is listed individually on the National Register of Historic Places. Rocky Hill Castle was a forced-labor plantation whose architecturally renowned plantation house was demolished in 1961.

== Geography ==
Courtland is concentrated in area along Big Nance Creek, a tributary of the Tennessee River, west of Decatur and southeast of Muscle Shoals. The town's municipal boundaries extend northeastward to U.S. Route 72. The town of North Courtland borders Courtland to the north.

According to the U.S. Census Bureau, the town has a total area of 2.3 square miles (6.0 km^{2}), of which 2.3 square miles (6.0 km^{2}) is land and 0.43% is water.

== Demographics ==
Historical population
Census	Pop.	Note	%±
1880	580		—
1890	579		−0.2%
1900	488		−15.7%
1910	478		−2.0%
1920	367		−23.2%
1930	359		−2.2%
1940	454		26.5%
1950	507		11.7%
1960	495		−2.4%
1970	547		10.5%
1980	456		−16.6%
1990	803		76.1%
2000	769		−4.2%
2010	609		−20.8%
2020	583		−4.3%
U.S. Decennial Census; 2013 Estimate

From 1880 until 1910, Courtland was the largest town in Lawrence County, losing the distinction in 1920 to the county seat of Moulton, which has held it to date.

As of the census of 2000, there were 769 people, 316 households, and 210 families residing in the town. The population density was 331.2 inhabitants per square mile (127.9/km^{2}). There were 363 housing units at an average density of 156.4 per square mile (60.4/km^{2}). The racial makeup of the town was 54.23% White, 40.44% Black or African American, 2.08% Native American, 0.26% Asian, 0.13% Pacific Islander, and 2.86% from two or more races. 0.91% of the population were Hispanic or Latino of any race.

There were 316 households, out of which 32.9% had children under the age of 18 living with them, 44.0% were married couples living together, 20.3% had a female householder with no husband present, and 33.5% were non-families. 30.7% of all households were made up of individuals, and 14.2% had someone living alone who was 65 years of age or older. The average household size was 2.43 and the average family size was 3.06.

In the town, the population was spread out, with 27.8% under the age of 18, 8.7% from 18 to 24, 26.9% from 25 to 44, 23.0% from 45 to 64, and 13.5% who were 65 years of age or older. The median age was 36 years. For every 100 females there were 85.7 males. For every 100 females age 18 and over, there were 77.3 males.

The median income for a household in the town was $27,500, and the median income for a family was $36,000. Males had a median income of $31,250 versus $17,188 for females. The per capita income for the town was $14,456. About 18.1% of families and 20.2% of the population were below the poverty line, including 22.7% of those under age 18 and 32.9% of those age 65 or over.

=== 2020 census ===
Courtland racial composition
Race	Num.	Perc.
White (non-Hispanic)	281	48.19%
Black or African American (non-Hispanic)	241	41.34%
Native American	9	1.54%
Pacific Islander	1	0.17%
Other/Mixed	51	8.75%
Hispanic or Latino	8	1.37%

As of the 2020 United States census, there were 583 people, 293 households, and 211 families residing in the city.

== Notable people ==
- Sam Agee, American football player
- Thomas Jefferson Foster, two-term member of the Confederate Congress
- David Hubbard, former U.S. Congressman for the 2nd and 5th Districts of Alabama and former member of the Confederate Congress
- Jack Shackelford, one of the few survivors of the Goliad massacre
