= Goliad massacre =

1836 event of the Texas Revolution

- Part of the Texas Revolution
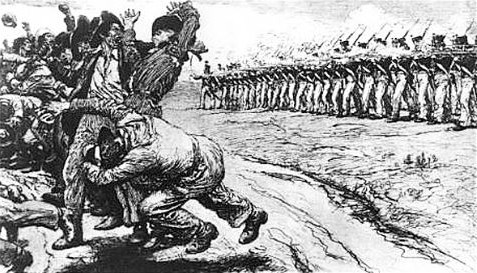
- Goliad Executions by Norman Mills Price

- Goliad massacre (Texas)
- Location: 28.6476°N 97.3830°W; Goliad, Mexican Texas
- Date: March 27, 1836
- Attack type: Fusillading, assault and stabbing
- Deaths: 425–445 Texian Army prisoners
- Perpetrator: Mexican Army

The Goliad massacre was an event of the Texas Revolution that occurred on March 27, 1836, following the Battle of Refugio and the Battle of Coleto; 425–445 prisoners of war from the Texian Army of the Republic of Texas were executed by the Mexican Army in the town of Goliad, Texas. The men surrendered under the belief they would be set free within a few weeks; however, this was not to be. Despite appeals for clemency by General José de Urrea, the massacre was carried out by Lt. Colonel José Nicolás de la Portilla, under orders from General and President of Mexico Antonio Lopez de Santa Anna.

The entire Texian force was killed, except for 28 men who feigned death and escaped. Among these was Herman Ehrenberg, who later wrote an account of the massacre; William Lockhart Hunter survived despite being bayoneted and clubbed with a musket. Because of the intervention of Francita Alavez (known as the "Angel of Goliad"), 20 more men were spared to act as doctors, interpreters, or workers. Also spared were the 75 soldiers of the Miller and Nashville Battalion, who were given white arm bands. Among those killed were commanders Colonel James Fannin (of the Coleto battle) and Lieutenant Colonel William Ward (of the Refugio battle).

== Background ==
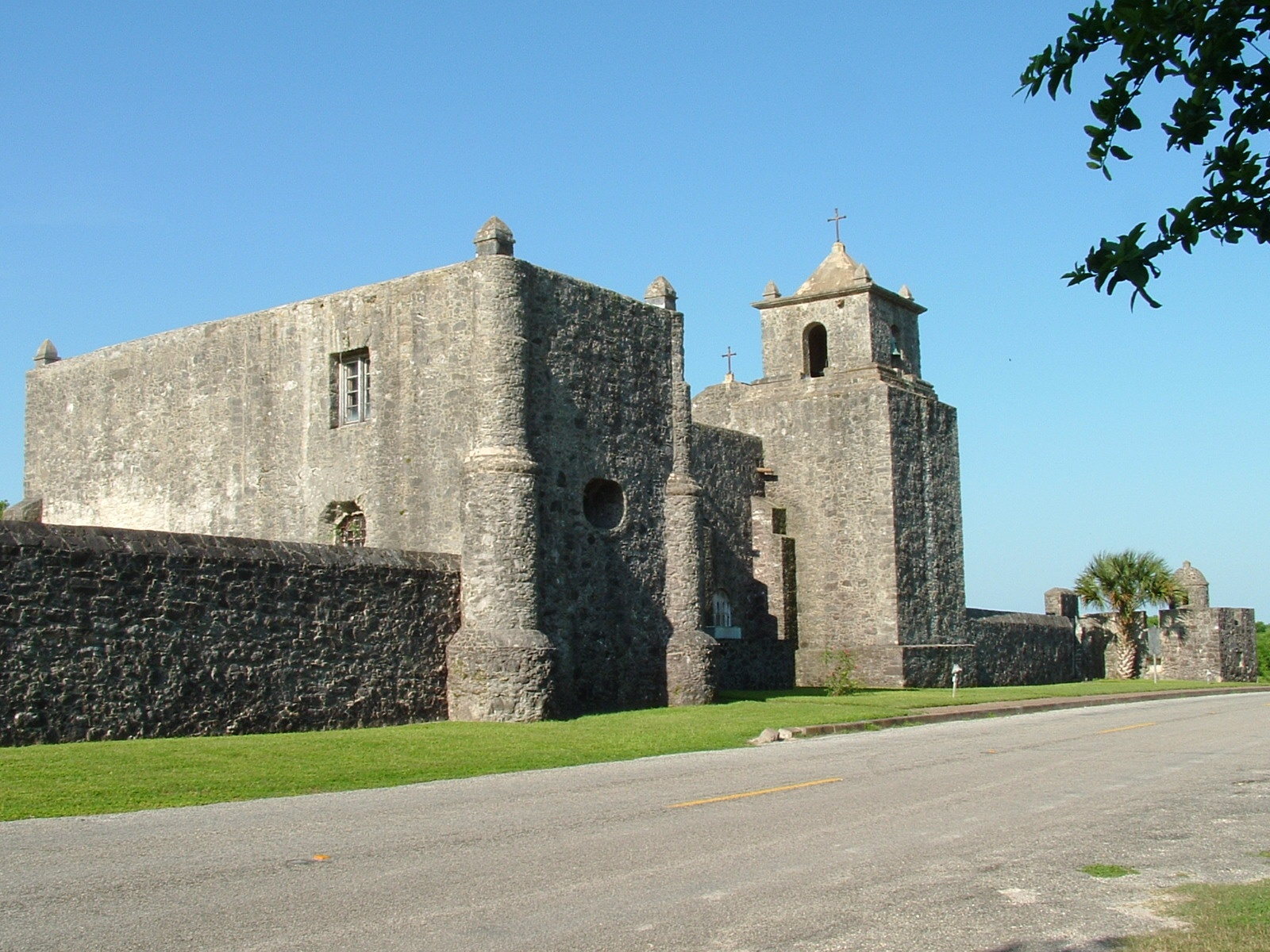
Presidio La Bahía National Historic Site where soldiers of the defeated Texian Army were executed en masse by forces of the Centralist Republic of Mexico

After Santa Anna learned that a force of Texas rebels was heading toward Matamoros, he sent General Urrea to march north along the coast of Texas to stop them. Urrea arrived in Matamoros and worked to secure cooperation from the local inhabitants on January 31, 1836. Meanwhile, General Sam Houston had persuaded all but 70 to 100 men and their leaders, Frank W. Johnson and James Grant, to give up on the expedition and to defend locations in Texas, principally Goliad. On February 12, Fannin took most of the men to defend Presidio La Bahía at Goliad, which he renamed "Fort Defiance".

On February 16, Urrea crossed the Rio Grande with 188 cavalry and 205 infantry. He recruited about 200 Tejano volunteers from the area, including some previously sympathetic to the Texians, to join him. At 3:00 a.m. on February 27, Urrea's advance patrol surprised Johnson and about 45 men, initiating the Battle of San Patricio. Urrea's force killed 16 men and took 24 prisoners. Johnson and four others escaped in the darkness and rejoined Fannin's command at Goliad, where they said that all the prisoners had been executed. They had first given this account at a ranch where they had taken refuge after the escape. Urrea had sent 18 of the 24 prisoners to Matamoros, where they were sentenced to death, but later released. Johnson's news persuaded Fannin to abandon any further attempt to send relief to the Alamo or to try to secure badly needed supplies waiting at Matagorda; he prepared the Presidio La Bahía at Goliad for defense against the advancing Mexican Army.

On March 2, at the Battle of Agua Dulce, Grant was killed, as were about 20 other men under his command. On March 6, the Mexican force under Santa Anna stormed the Alamo and killed the garrison. On March 14, Colonel William Ward and 200 men, who had been sent to help Captain Amon B. King evacuate colonists at Refugio, were surrounded by Urrea's force. Although Ward and his men fled that night during a blinding rainstorm, the Mexicans overtook part of Ward's force, killing 18 and capturing 31. King and a group were executed on March 16 at Refugio. After capturing one of Fannin's messengers, who was carrying dispatches that told of the commander's plan to wait at Goliad and retreat after King and Ward returned, Urrea ordered the execution of 30 prisoners who he decided were mercenaries. He freed more than 20 others who he determined to be Mexicans or colonists, so he would not be hindered by taking prisoners along on his advance on Fannin's force.

On March 19, Urrea had quickly advanced and surrounded 300 men of the Texian Army on the open prairie, near La Bahia (Goliad). The two-day Battle of Coleto ensued, with the Texians holding their own on the first day. The Mexicans received overwhelming reinforcements and heavy artillery. In this critical predicament, Fannin and the majority of the men voted to surrender the Texian forces on March 20. Led to believe that they would be paroled and released into the United States, they were returned to the fort at Goliad, now their prison. Albert Clinton Horton and his company had been acting as the advance and rear guards for Fannin's company. Surprised by an overwhelming Mexican force, most were chased off and escaped, but 18 were captured and marched back to Goliad. The 75 soldiers of William Parsons Miller and the Nashville Battalion were captured on March 20 and marched to Goliad on March 23. On March 22, William Ward and the Georgia Battalion (80 men plus Ward) surrendered after escaping from the Battle of Refugio. About 26 men were retained at Victoria as laborers, but 55 of the prisoners were marched into Goliad on March 25.

== Massacre ==
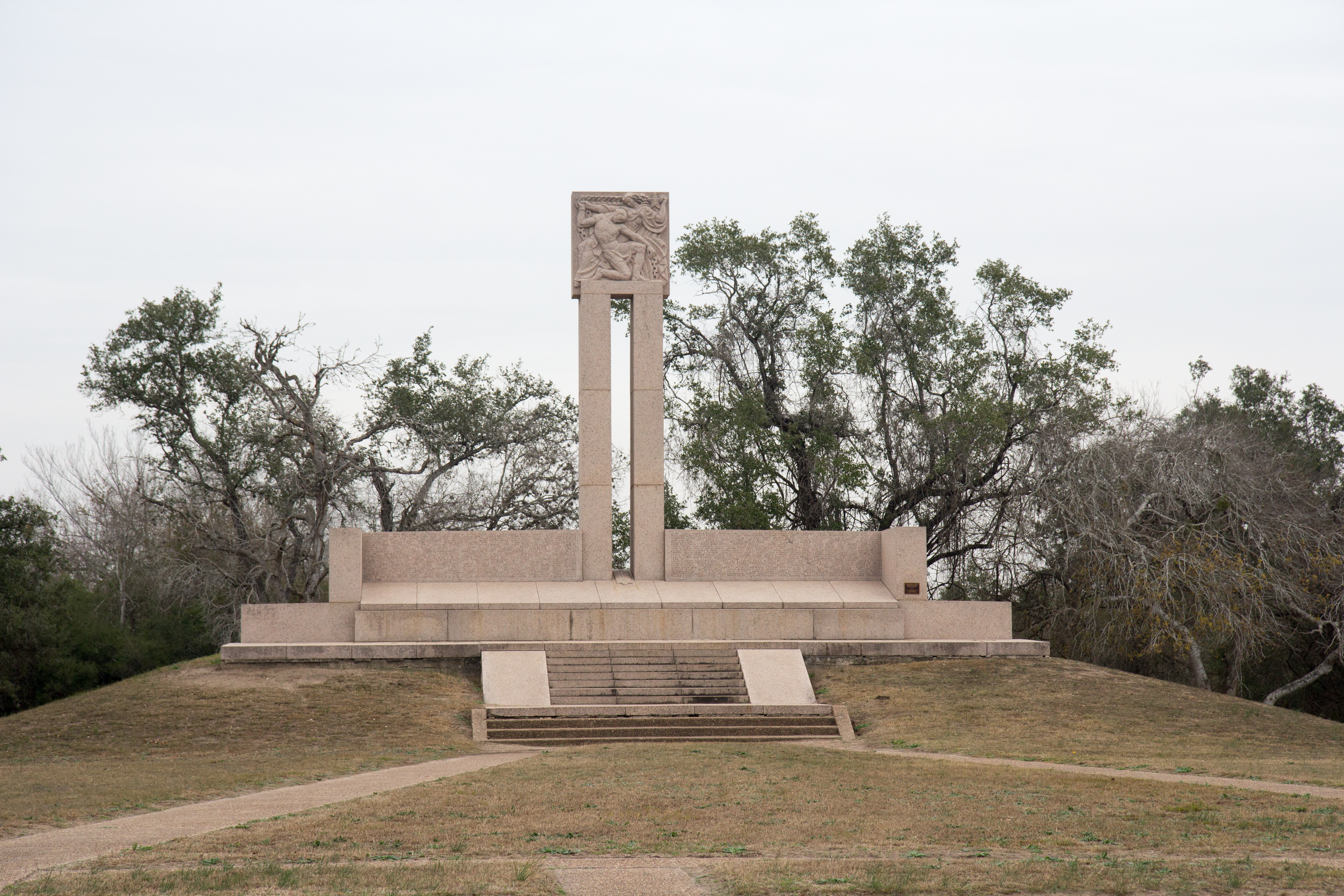
Fannin Memorial Monument marks the location where the Texians from the Goliad Massacre were finally buried.

The Mexicans took the Texians back to Goliad, where they were held as prisoners at Fort Defiance (Presidio La Bahia). The Texians thought they would likely be set free in a few weeks. Urrea departed Goliad, leaving Colonel José Nicolás de la Portilla in command. Urrea wrote to Santa Anna to ask for clemency for the Texians. Under a decree that Santa Anna had pushed for, and which was passed by the Mexican Congress on December 30, 1835, armed foreigners taken in combat were to be treated as pirates and executed. Urrea wrote in his diary that he "...wished to elude these orders as far as possible without compromising my personal responsibility." Santa Anna responded to this entreaty by repeatedly ordering Urrea to comply with the law and execute the prisoners. He also had a similar order sent directly to the "Officer Commanding the Post of Goliad". This order was received by Portilla on March 26, who decided it was his duty to comply, despite receiving a countermanding order from Urrea later that same day.

The next day, Palm Sunday, March 27, 1836, Portilla had between 425 and 445 Texians marched from Fort Defiance in three columns on the Bexar Road, San Patricio Road, and the Victoria Road, between two rows of Mexican soldiers. The sick and injured stayed in the chapel. The ones marching out of the fort were told they were gathering wood and other supplies and they believed they would be freed soon. The Mexicans forced them to turn facing away from the soldiers, confused, the Texian rebels were shot point blank. Wounded survivors were clubbed and knifed to death. The sick and injured in the chapel were killed in their beds and shot against the chapel walls. Forty Texians were unable to walk. Thirty-nine were killed inside the fort under the direction of Captain Carolino Huerta of the Tres Villas battalion, with Colonel Garay saving one, Jack Shackelford. Fannin was the last to be executed, after seeing his men killed. He was taken by Mexican soldiers to the courtyard in front of the chapel, blindfolded, and seated in a chair. He made three requests: that his personal possessions be sent to his family, to be shot in the heart and not the face, and to be given a Christian burial. The soldiers took his belongings, shot him in the face, and burned his body along with those of the other Texians killed that day.

The entire Texian force was killed, except for 28 men who feigned death and escaped. Among these was Herman Ehrenberg, who later wrote an account of the massacre; William Lockhart Hunter, also of the New Orleans Greys, who survived despite being bayoneted and clubbed with a musket; and four members of Shackelford's Red Rovers: Dillard Cooper, Zachariah S. Brooks, Wilson Simpson, and Isaac D. Hamilton, who escaped after days on the run. Because of the intervention of Francita Alavez (known as the "Angel of Goliad"), 20 more men, including Shackelford, were spared to act as doctors, interpreters, or workers. Also spared were the 75 soldiers of Miller and the Nashville Battalion. They were later marched to Matamoros. Spared men were given white arm bands and, while wearing them, could walk about freely. They were advised not to take off the arm band, since Mexican troops were hunting for those few who had escaped from Coleto, Victoria, and the massacre itself.

== Aftermath ==
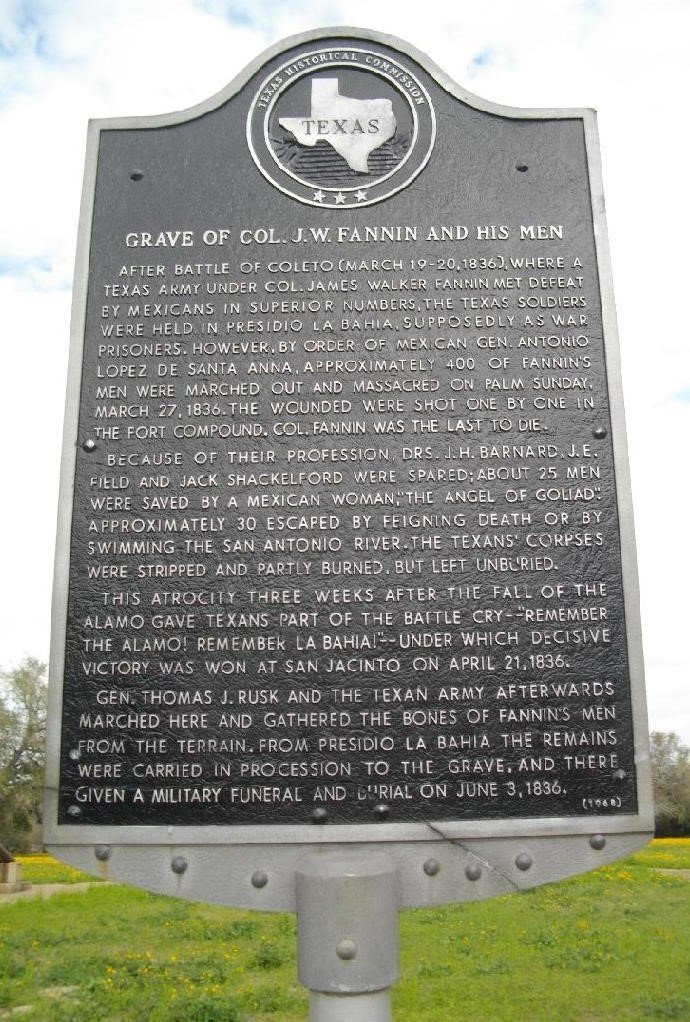
Historical Marker at Fannin Memorial Monument – La Bahia, Texas

The Goliad massacre contributed to the frenzy of the Runaway Scrape. After the executions, the Texians' bodies were piled and burned. Their charred remains were left in the open, unburied, and exposed to vultures and coyotes. Nearly one month later, word reached La Bahia (Goliad) that Santa Anna had been defeated and had surrendered while trying to flee at the Battle of San Jacinto. General Thomas J. Rusk found the remains of the massacre victims in June 1836 and gave orders for a formal military funeral. The remains were interred at a location southeast of the Presidio la Bahia. This has since been preserved and designated as the Fannin Memorial Monument. The location of the gravesite was forgotten until 1930, when human bone fragments were discovered by a group of Boy Scouts and their leader. The massacre is commemorated in Walt Whitman's poem Song of Myself, section 34. This is featured in his collected poems titled Leaves of Grass. In 1939, the Fannin Memorial Monument by Raoul Josset was erected at the gravesite. It features an art deco relief sculpture with the known names of 371 of the dead.

== Historical Poem on the Goliad Massacre ==
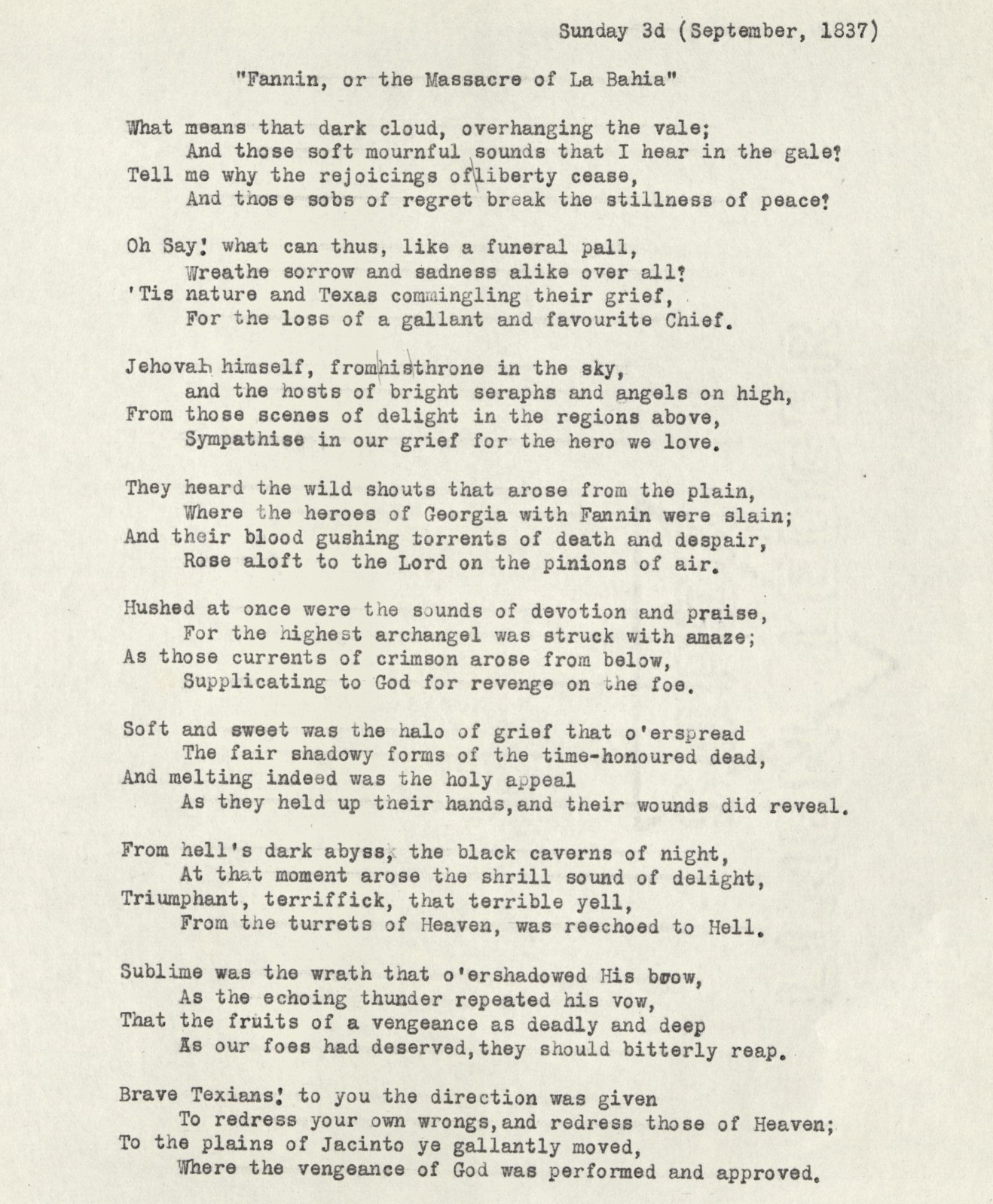
Fannin, or the Massacre of LaBahía

On September 3, 1837, Charles Drake Ferris, originally from New York, served as a soldier during the Texas Revolution and was a member of the "Horse Marines", wrote an emotional poem about the Goliad Massacre. The poem is entitled "Fannin, or the Massacre of La Bahía". The original hand written poem is held in the Ferris-Lovejoy Family Papers collection located at B.Y.U. in the L. Tom Perry Special Collections Library. The image posted is a transcribed typed version. A detailed story of Charles Drake Ferris' life can be found on the Warren Angus Ferris Ancestry blog. https://ferrisancestry.blog

== See also ==
- List of massacres in the United States
- War crime
- Bibliography of the Texas Revolution, Republic, and Annexation
