= Jack Shackelford =

American doctor, politician and soldier

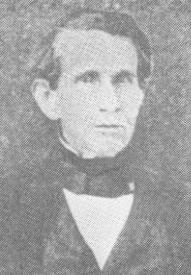

Member of Alabama State Senate
- In office 1822–1824

Personal details
- Born: March 20, 1790 Richmond, Virginia
- Died: January 22, 1857 (aged 66) Courtland, Alabama

Military service
- Branch/service: Texian Army
- Years of service: 1835-1836
- Rank: Captain
- Unit: Red Rovers
- Battles/wars: Texas Revolution

Jack Shackelford (March 20, 1790 – January 22, 1857) was an American medical doctor, politician and soldier. He raised and led a unit in Courtland, Alabama called the Red Rovers or the Alabama Red Rovers to fight in the Texas Revolution. He was one of the few survivors of the Goliad massacre.

== Early life ==
Jack Shackelford was born in Richmond, Virginia, to Richard Shackelford. After obtaining his M.D., he moved to Winnsboro, South Carolina, where he opened his medical practice. He married local Maria Young or Youngue.

In the War of 1812, he joined the Army and served on Andrew Jackson's staff, being wounded at Charleston.

In 1818, he moved to Shelby County, Alabama, and purchased a cotton plantation. He was elected to the Alabama State Senate three times, in 1822, 1823 and 1824. However, he was forced to sell his plantation after standing surety for a cousin whose business failed. He was employed as the head of the United States Land Office in Courtland, Alabama, and also as treasurer of the Tuscumbia, Courtland and Decatur Railroad.

== Red Rovers and Texas Revolution ==
In 1835, Dr. Jack Shackelford raised a company to fight against the Mexicans in the Texas Revolution. Nearly 70 strong, it included his oldest son, Fortunatus; two nephews; and almost half the men of Courtland. They came to be called the Red Rovers because of the color of their jeans or uniforms. Under the command of Colonel James Fannin, they fought in the Battle of Coleto on March 19–20, 1836. The Texians were defeated and forced to surrender. Most of the prisoners, including Fannin and Fortunatus Shackelford, were executed in the infamous Goliad massacre, but Jack Shackelford and several other doctors were spared to care for the Mexican wounded. During the Mexicans' retreat after their defeat at the Battle of San Jacinto, Shackelford and Dr. Joseph Henry Barnard managed to escape. Shackelford was honorably discharged and returned home to Alabama. He wrote of his war experiences in a memoir entitled "Some Few Notes upon a Part of the Texas War".

== Post-Texas Revolution years ==
After his wife died in 1842, Jack Shackelford married Martha Chardevoyne.

Dr. Jack Shackelford died in Courtland on January 22, 1857.

The following year, Shackelford County, Texas, was named in his honor.
