= Battle of Lipantitlán =

1835 Mexican defeat in the Texas Revolution

- Part of the Texas Revolution
Date	November 4, 1835
Location	Fort Lipantitlán, near San Patricio, Texas 27.964694°N 97.8175°W
Result	Texian victory

Belligerents
Texian Rebels	Mexico

Commanders and leaders
Ira Westover	Nicolás Rodríguez

Strength
60–70 men	90 men

Casualties and losses
1 wounded	3–5 killed 14–17 wounded
- Location within Texas

The Battle of Lipantitlán, also known as the Battle of Nueces Crossing, was fought along the Nueces River on November 4, 1835 between the Mexican Army and Texian insurgents, as part of the Texas Revolution. After the Texian victory at the Battle of Goliad, only two Mexican garrisons remained in Texas, Fort Lipantitlán near San Patricio and the Alamo Mission at San Antonio de Béxar (modern-day San Antonio in the U.S. state of Texas). Fearing that Lipantitlán could be used as a base for the Mexican army to retake Goliad and angry that two of his men were imprisoned there, Texian commander Philip Dimmitt ordered his adjutant, Captain Ira Westover, to capture the fort.

The commander of Fort Lipantitlán, Nicolás Rodríguez, had been ordered to harass the Texian troops at Goliad. Rodríguez took the bulk of his men on an expedition; while they were gone, Westover's force arrived in San Patricio. On November 3, a local man persuaded the Mexican garrison to surrender, and the following day the Texians dismantled the fort. Rodríguez returned as the Texians were crossing the swollen Nueces River to return to Goliad. The Mexican soldiers attacked. After a short period, the Mexicans retreated. One Texian was injured, 3–5 Mexican soldiers were killed, and 14–17 were wounded.

The injured Mexican troops were allowed to seek medical treatment in San Patricio, and the remaining Mexican soldiers retreated to Matamoros. The Texians now had full control of the Texas Gulf Coast, which meant that the troops stationed at San Antonio de Béxar could only receive reinforcements and supplies overland. Historian Bill Groneman believes that this contributed to the eventual Mexican defeat at the siege of Béxar, which expelled all Mexican troops from Texas. The former site of the fort is now a Texas historic site.

== Background ==
Fort Lipantitlán was built on the grounds of an old campsite along the west bank of the Nueces River on the Gulf coast of Texas. The site was first occupied by a nomadic Lipan Apache tribe during their periodic visits. After the Apaches abandoned the area, the campground was often used by missionaries, military units, and traders making their way between Mexico and the Texas settlements. In 1825 or 1826, Mexican officials constructed a makeshift fort, named Lipantitlán after the Lipan Apaches, at the campsite. According to Texian John J. Linn, the fort "was a single embankment of earth, lined within by fence rails to hold the dirt in place, and would have answered tolerably well, perhaps, for a second-rate hog pen". The embankment was surrounded by a large ditch; just outside the ditch lay adobe and wooden huts for the officers and their families.

Between 80 and 125 soldiers from the 2nd Active (Cavalry) Company of Tamaulipas were garrisoned at the fort. They collected customs duties and provided protection to San Patricio, a small settlement of Irish and Mexican colonists approximately 3 miles (4.8 km) south. Smaller garrisons were located at Copano Bay and Refugio, with a larger force stationed at Presidio La Bahía in Goliad.

“	Repress with strong arm all those who, forgetting their duties to the nation which has adopted them as her children, are pushing forward with a desire to live at their own option without subjection to the laws.	”
– Mexican President Antonio López de Santa Anna's orders to General Martín Perfecto de Cos

In 1835, federalists in several interior Mexican states revolted against the increasingly centralist reign of Mexican President Antonio López de Santa Anna. The Texians staged a minor revolt against customs duties in June, and wary colonists soon began forming militias, ostensibly to protect themselves. Fearing that strong measures were needed to quell the unrest, Santa Anna ordered General Martín Perfecto de Cos to lead a large force into Texas; Cos arrived in Texas on September 20.

The Texas Revolution officially began on October 2 at the Battle of Gonzales. Within days, Texian insurgents seized Presidio La Bahía, located at Goliad. Twenty Mexican soldiers escaped and briefly took refuge at Copano and Refugio; those garrisons soon abandoned their posts and joined the larger force at Fort Lipantitlán. The Mexican soldiers at Lipantitlán began improving the defenses of their small fort. As the only remaining garrison on the Texas coast, Fort Lipantitlán was a vital link between the Mexican interior and Béxar, the political center of Texas which housed Cos and the only other force of Mexican troops in Texas.

Captain Philip Dimmitt assumed command of the Texians at Presidio La Bahía. In a letter to General Stephen F. Austin dated October 15, Dimmitt proposed an attack on Fort Lipantitlán, whose capture would "secure the frontier, provide a vital station for defense, create instability among the centralists, and encourage Mexican federalists". Most of the federalists in San Patricio were afraid of retaliation if they openly defied Santa Anna's centralist policies. They were also reluctant to hold elections for delegates to the Consultation, which would decide whether Texians were fighting for reinstatement of the Constitution of 1824 or for independence from Mexico. Soldiers at Lipantitlán had also imprisoned two of Dimmitt's men, John Williams and John Toole, as they tried to deliver missives to the federalist leaders in San Patricio on October 10 and 11. Dimmitt hoped to free the men after capturing Fort Lipantitlán.

On October 20, James Power, one of the Irish empresarios who had helped to found San Patricio, learned that the Lipantitlán soldiers had been ordered to retake Presidio La Bahia. Two hundred cavalry were expected to reinforce the Lipantitlán garrison before the attack, with an additional 200–300 soldiers expected later. Although Dimmitt forwarded the intelligence to Austin, he was not given authorization to attack. The delay proved costly to Williams and Toole, who were marched to the Mexican interior, beyond the reach of the Texians. According to Dimmitt's angry letter to Austin, Toole begged his captors to kill him outright rather than send him on the march, which he believed would still result in his death. Dimmitt concluded, "this news, after the leniency shown to the prisoners taken here, could not fail to create a lively, and a strong excitement. The men under my command are clamorous for retaliation".

== Prelude ==
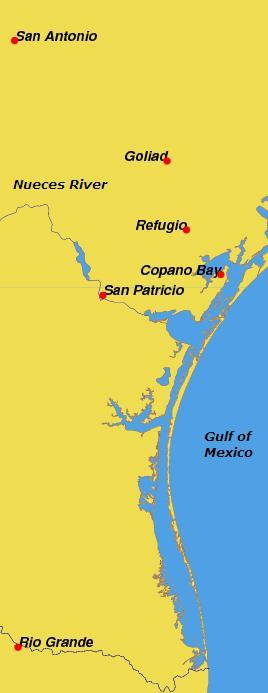
The Texan garrison at Goliad was about 60 miles (97 km) from San Patricio. Fort Lipantitlán was located across the Nueces River from San Patricio. The Mexican interior lay south of the Rio Grande, about 130 miles (210 km) from San Patricio.

The furor over the removal of Williams and Toole likely led Dimmitt to take matters into his own hands. On October 31 he sent a member of his staff, Adjutant Ira Westover, to take 35 men to attack Fort Lipantitlán. A self-appointed advisory committee—John J. Linn, Major James Kerr and Power—rode along. The three advisors had been elected to the Consultation but delayed their departure so that they could participate in the fighting.

Rather than riding directly southwest to the fort, Westover travelled southeast to Refugio. This alternative route was likely intended to suggest that the expedition was headed for Copano Bay. An unknown number of men joined the expedition in Refugio; historian Craig Roell believes that the expedition grew by at least 20 men, and historian Bill Groneman estimated that Westover's force numbered 60–70 men when it reached San Patricio.

Meanwhile, the commander of the garrison at Fort Lipantitlán, Captain Nicolás Rodríguez, received orders to harass the Texians at Presidio La Bahía. On October 31, as Rodríguez and his men neared Goliad, they learned that a Texian force had left the fort earlier that day. The Mexican soldiers immediately retraced their route. They did not encounter any Texian soldiers during their march and arrived on November 1 to find the fort unmolested. Uncertain as to what the Texians intended to do, Rodríguez and the bulk of his garrison (almost 80 men) turned back towards Goliad to attempt to intercept the Texians. Between 21 and 27 soldiers, armed with two cannon, remained to defend the fort.

== Battle ==
Rodríguez expected the Texians to take a direct route. his men patrolled the northern approaches to the fort. Westover's men instead approached from the east, eluding the Mexican patrols. Five miles (8 km) from San Patricio, Westover received word that Rodríguez was searching for the Texians. He forced the men to increase their pace, and they arrived at San Patricio 30 minutes after sundown on November 3. Westover positioned two small groups of men to guard the Nueces River crossings, about 70 yards (64 m) from the fort. As the rest of the Texians prepared for a dawn assault, two San Patricio residents wandered into their camp. Westover arrested one of them, James O'Riley, for "aiding and assisting the enemy". In exchange for his liberty, O'Riley offered to persuade the Mexican garrison to surrender. Historians have no records of what methods O'Riley used, but by 11 pm the Mexican soldiers had surrendered, without a shot fired. They were released immediately as long as they promised not to fight again during the Texas Revolution. The Texians captured the two 4-lb (1.8-kg) cannons, 18 muskets, and 3–4 pounds (1.4–1.8 kg) of powder. They also released several Texians who had been held prisoner in the fort.

The following day, Texians burned the wooden huts adjacent to the fort and dismantled the embankments. By 3 pm they had rounded up 14 horses and were preparing to bring the cannons back to Goliad. In the meantime, Rodriguez had travelled almost all the way to Goliad. Before he reached Presidio La Bahía, one of his spies arrived with news that the Texians had taken Fort Lipantitlán. Rodriguez and his men—including 10 colonists from San Patricio—marched back toward the fort, arriving at about 4 pm.

The Texians used a small canoe to transport men across the Nueces River, and when the Mexican soldiers were sighted only half of the Texian force had crossed to the east bank of the river. As the Mexican soldiers attacked, the Texians took cover in a grove of trees. The trees prevented the cavalry from approaching, so Rodriguez's men dismounted and attempted to attack from both sides. After 30 minutes of fighting, the Mexicans withdrew, leaving behind 8 horses and several wounded men. The only Texian injured was Lieutenant William Bracken, who lost three fingers. Texian rifleman A. J. Jones later wrote to Fannin that 3 Mexicans had died with 14 wounded, though historian Stephen Hardin believes that 5 Mexicans died with 17 wounded. Jones's letter mentioned that three of the wounded were the alcalde, judge, and sheriff of San Patricio.

== Aftermath ==
Without draft animals, the Texians had no easy way to transport the artillery. As night approached, a cold rain began to fall, and the men became discouraged. Westover, Kerr, Linn, and Power agreed to throw the artillery in the river rather than continue to struggle with it. The Texians also deposited their cache of captured ammunition and muskets in the river; in their opinion, the supplies were useless.

Most Texians spent the night in San Patricio, housed by sympathetic locals. The Mexican troops camped outdoors near the battle site. At dawn, Westover agreed to allow the wounded Mexican soldiers to be transported to San Patricio for treatment. The following day one of the wounded soldiers, Mexican Lieutenant Marcellino Garcia, died. Garcia was a personal friend of Linn, and the Texians gave him a full burial with honors.

Westover sent a messenger to Rodríguez to request "another pleasant meeting". Rodríguez declined the offer and retreated with his remaining men to Matamoros. Their departure left only one remaining group of Mexican soldiers in Texas, those under General Cos at Béxar. The Texians now controlled the Gulf Coast, and so all communication between Cos and the Mexican interior must be transferred overland. The long distance involved severely slowed the delivery of messages and receipt of supplies and reinforcements. According to Groneman, this likely contributed to Cos's defeat in the siege of Béxar, which expelled the remaining Mexican soldiers from Texas.

On their return to Goliad, Westover's group encountered Agustín Viesca, the recently deposed governor of Coahuila y Tejas. Several months before, Viesca had been imprisoned by the Mexican army for defying attempts by Santa Anna to disband the state legislature. He and members of his cabinet had been liberated by sympathetic soldiers and immediately travelled to Texas to recreate the state government. Westover and his men provided a military escort to Goliad, arriving on November 12. Dimmitt welcomed Viesca but refused to recognize his authority as governor. This caused an uproar in the garrison; many supported the governor, while others believed that Texas should be an independent country and should therefore not recognize the Mexican governor. (Note: The Consultation also later refused to recognize Viesca's authority, choosing instead to create a General Council to govern Texas. Huson (1974), p. 123.)

Dimmitt later chastised Westover for not following orders during the expedition. (Note: No record remains of the orders Westover neglected to follow.) Westover refused to make an official report to Dimmitt. Instead, he sent a written report to Sam Houston, the commander-in-chief of the regular army. In Westover's opinion, "The men all fought bravely and those on the opposite bank of the river were enabled to operate on the flanks of the enemy above and below the crossing which they did with fine effect." Houston lauded "the conduct and bravery of the officers and men who have so handsomely acquitted themselves in the affair and so deservedly won [a] reputation for themselves and Glory for their Country". This was the first armed skirmish fought since the Battle of Goliad, according to historian Hobart Huson, the victory "renewed the morale of the people". News of the battle spread throughout the United States, and the Texians were widely praised in American newspapers.

The removal of Mexican army oversight encouraged federalists in San Patricio. These men soon gained control of the municipal government, formed a militia, and elected delegates to represent them at the Consultation. However, the town remained divided; many still supported the centralist Mexican government. After reaching Matamoros, Rodríguez sent a letter to the town leaders. The letter warned that the Mexican army would return and encouraged the people of San Patricio to repudiate the rebellion. One of the San Patricio federalists later wrote Dimmitt, "We have neither men nor means to withstand any force that may be sent against us." The Texians chose not to garrison men in or near San Patricio. In 1836, as part of Santa Anna's invasion of Texas, General José de Urrea led Mexican forces along the Texas coastline and retook San Patricio on February 27.

In 1937, the land comprising the former site of Fort Lipantitlán was donated to the state of Texas. The Texas State Parks Board gained control over the site in 1949. Now named the Lipantitlan State Historic Site, the park covers 5 acres (2.0 ha) in Nueces County. A stone marker indicates the location of the former fort.

== See also ==
- List of Texas Revolution battles
- Timeline of the Texas Revolution

== Sources ==
- Groneman, Bill (1998). Battlefields of Texas. Plano, TX: Republic of Texas Press. ISBN 978-1-55622-571-0. OCLC 37935129.
- Hardin, Stephen L. (1994). Texian Iliad – A Military History of the Texas Revolution. Illustrations by Gary S. Zaboly. Austin, TX: University of Texas Press. ISBN 0-292-73086-1. OCLC 29704011.
- Huson, Hobart (1974). Captain Phillip Dimmitt's Commandancy of Goliad, 1835–1836: An Episode of the Mexican Federalist War in Texas, Usually Referred to as the Texian Revolution. Austin, TX: Von Boeckmann-Jones Co. OCLC 1207100.
- Roell, Craig H. (1994). Remember Goliad! A History of La Bahia. Fred Rider Cotten Popular History Series. Austin, TX: Texas State Historical Association. ISBN 0-87611-141-X. OCLC 30667624.
- Todish, Timothy J.; Todish, Terry; Spring, Ted (1998). Alamo Sourcebook, 1836: A Comprehensive Guide to the Battle of the Alamo and the Texas Revolution. Austin, TX: Eakin Press. ISBN 978-1-57168-152-2.
