= Ira Westover =

American military officer (c.1795–1836)

- Born: Ira J. Westover c. 1795; Massachusetts, US
- Died: March 27, 1836 (aged 40–41) Goliad, Texas, US
- Allegiance: Republic of Texas
- Branch: Texian Army
- Service years: 1835–1836
- Rank: Captain
- Conflicts: Texas Revolution; Battle of Goliad; Battle of Lipantitlán; Battle of Coleto

Ira J. Westover (c. 1795 – March 27, 1836) was an American military officer. He served in the Texian Army and fought in the Texas Revolution. He was killed in the Goliad massacre.

== Early life ==
Westover was born c. 1795, in Massachusetts. He was Protestant and a merchant. He was married to Rebecca Greenleaf Westover and had an adopted son, likely a nephew. His family travelled to Jeffersonville, Kentucky, where they then sailed the rivers to New Orleans in a flatboat. Between June 6 and 11, 1834, they were stranded on Padre Island without food or water after a shipwreck. They were found by Mexicans and were brought to San Patricio, Texas. In Texas, Westover was a merchant. He lived in the McMullen-McGloin Colony, followed by the Power and Hewetson Colony, then Refugio.

== Military service ==
In the Texas Revolution, Westover supported the Republic of Texas, serving as a militiaman and on the Refugio committee of safety and correspondence. He organized a group of sixteen men (including his adopted son and Thomas O'Connor) to fight alongside George Morse Collinsworth. The group was present at the Battle of Goliad and may have helped capture the Presidio La Bahía. Westover remained in Goliad after Collinsworth left, serving as the adjutant to Philip Dimmitt. He helped oversee Goliad for some time and was selected as a representative to the Consultation, though did not participate due to the Battle of Lipantitlán.

Per Dimmitt's orders, Westover commanded in the Battle of Lipantitlán and captured Fort Lipantitlán. The battle was a Mexican loss, however, the Texas forces left without taking the artillery, which was then repossessed the Mexicans. He then participated in the Battle of Nueces Crossing. Due to a feud between he, Dimmitt, and Agustín Viesca regarding Mexican sovreignty, Dimmitt dismissed Westover from his post.

After being dismissed, Westover joined his role in the Texas Legislature. On December 7, 1835, the legislature appointed him artillery commander of the Texian Army, with him resigning on December 17. He returned to oversee Goliad, as Dimmitt has been discharged. He served under James Fannin in the 1836 Goliad Campaign. On February 26, Fannin left Goliad and left Westover in charge of maintaining control of the city. While Westover was in charge, the Battle of Coleto broke out, which was a Mexican victory and followed by the Goliad massacre. Alongside his adopted son, he died in the massacre, on March 27, 1836, aged 40 or 41.

In 1936, the Texas government erected a commemorative plaque regarding Westover's military service.
