= Philip Dimmitt =

Texian Army officer

Philip Dimmitt (1801–1841) was an officer in the Texian Army during the Texas Revolution. Born in Kentucky, Dimmitt moved to Texas in 1823 and soon operated a series of trading posts. After learning that Mexican General Martín Perfecto de Cos was en route to Texas in 1835 to quell the unrest, Dimmitt proposed that the general be kidnapped on his arrival at Copano. The plan was shelved when fighting broke out at Gonzales, but by early October, 1835, it had been resuscitated by a group of volunteers at Matamoros. Not knowing that Cos had already departed for San Antonio de Bexar, this group decided to corner Cos at Presidio La Bahía in Goliad. Dimmitt joined them en route, and participated in the battle of Goliad.

Following the battle, Dimmitt assumed command of the Texian forces that remained at Presidio La Bahía. One of his first acts as commander was to design a new flag. Similar to the Mexican flag, his version replaced the central eagle with the words "Constitution of 1824", reflecting his loyalty to the Constitution of 1824, which had been repudiated by Mexican President Antonio López de Santa Anna. Against the wishes of the commander of the Texian Army, Dimmitt also authorized a group of his men to take Fort Lipantitlan. Their success meant that the only remaining group of Mexican soldiers in Texas were Cos's men in Bexar. Dimmitt and a few of his men left Goliad in early December to join the siege of Béxar and participated in the final battle which forced Cos to surrender. On their return to Goliad, Dimmitt's men declared independence from Mexico. In honor of their new aim, Dimmitt designed a second flag, a white background with a severed, bloody arm holding a sword. The new Texian Army commanders and the provisional government were angry with the premature declaration and instructed Dimmitt to lower his flag. He resigned his command in protest.

Soon after, Dimmitt joined the Texians garrisoned at the Alamo Mission in Bexar. On February 23, Alamo commander William B. Travis sent Dimmitt on a scouting mission to see if the Mexican Army was close. While Dimmitt was out, the Mexican Army surrounded Bexar. Fearing that he would not be able to reach the Alamo, Dimmitt instead returned to Victoria and tried to recruit volunteers to ride to the Alamo's relief. He and his volunteers eventually joined the Texian Army, under Sam Houston on April 22, the day after the battle of San Jacinto. Following the war, Dimmitt opened a trading post near the Nueces River. The post was raided by Mexican soldiers in July 1841 and Dimmitt was taken captive. He committed suicide in captivity later that year. Dimmit County, Texas is named for him.

== Early life ==
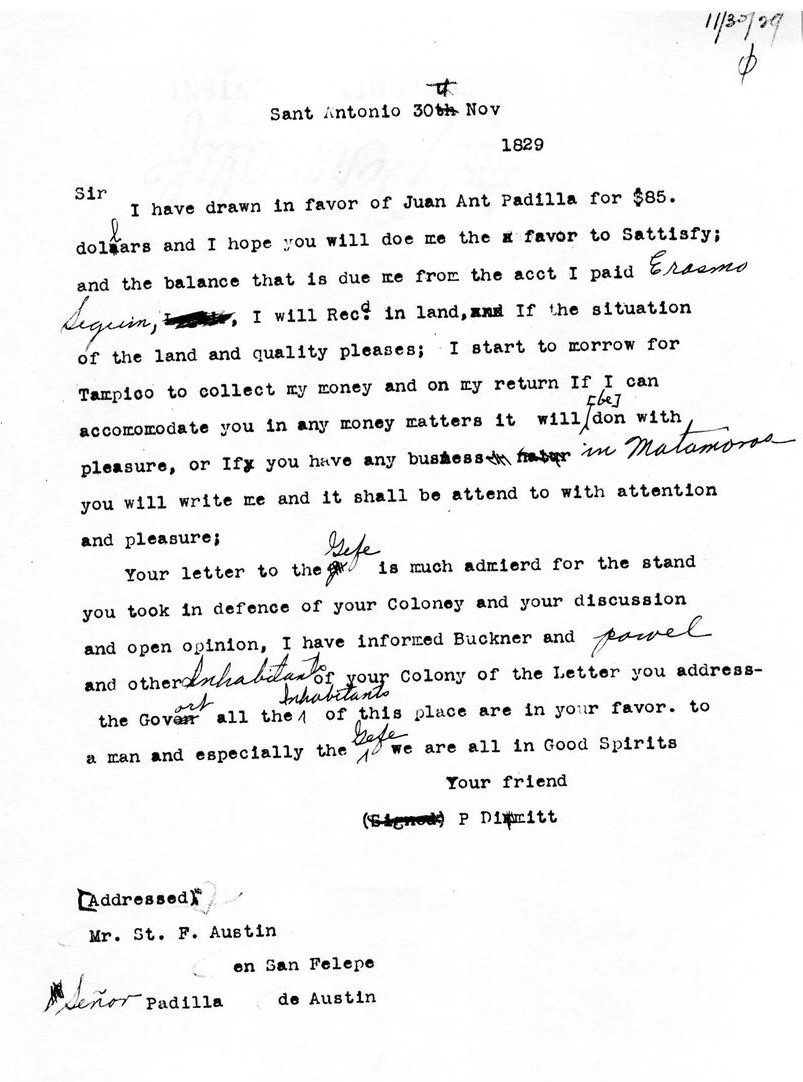
Philip Dimmitt letter to Stephen F. Austin, 30 November 1829

Dimmitt was born about 1801 in Jefferson County, Kentucky. In 1823, he moved to the Mexican province of Texas. For several years he lived in San Antonio de Bexar, where he worked as a commissary contractor for the Mexican soldiers garrisoned at the Alamo Mission. After marrying Maria Luisa Lazo, Dimmitt settled near Guadalupe Victoria in the colony of Martín De León. He supported his family by operating three trading posts. One was located near Victoria on the Guadalupe River. A second was at Goliad. The largest, which included a wharf and a warehouse, was at Dimmitt's Landing on Lavaca Bay. In 1835, Dimmitt purchased land in the Power and Hewetson colony, but he continued to live near Victoria.

== Texas Revolution ==
=== Goliad ===
After the Anahuac Disturbances of June 1835, Mexican President Antonio López de Santa Anna sent his brother-in-law, General Martín Perfecto de Cos to quell the unrest in Texas. Cos landed at Copano on September 20 and arrived in Goliad on October 2. As early as September 18] Dimmitt, along with James Fannin and John Linn, had begun advocating a plan to seize Cos at either Copano or Goliad. The plan was abandoned in late September as instead colonists flocked to Gonzales, where the Texas Revolution officially began on October 2.

On October 6, members of the Texian militia in Matagorda, under George Collinsworth, decided to implement Dimmitt's plan and march on Presidio La Bahía in Goliad. They intended to kidnap Cos and hold him for ransom. If possible, they also wished to steal the estimated $50,000 that was rumored to accompany Cos. When Collinsworth and his men stopped in Victoria to recruit more men for their expedition, Dimmitt joined, along with at least 30 other settlers. One of Dimmitt's contacts in Goliad informed him that Cos had already departed for San Antonio de Bexar, leaving only a small number of troops to defend Goliad. The Texian force continued on to Goliad, and after a brief fight gained control of the presidio. Although the battle had ended, over the next several days more Texian settlers joined the group at La Bahía. Stephen F. Austin, commander of the newly formed Texian Army, ordered that 100 men remain at Goliad under Dimmitt's command, while the rest should join the Texian Army in marching on Cos's troops in Béxar.

Dimmitt designed this flag supporting the Mexican Constitution of 1824.

Early in his tenure, he designed the flag that eventually became most associated with the Texas Revolution. His design began with the green, white, and red tricolor of the Mexican flag, but replaced the central eagle with the words "Constitution of 1824", or sometimes just "1824". This signified that the Texians were fighting to uphold the Constitution of 1824, which Santa Anna had nullified. By November, the Texas provisional government had ordered that all ships in the Texas Navy fly this flag.

In a letter to Austin dated October 15, Dimmitt proposed an attack on Fort Lipantitlán, whose capture would "secure the frontier, provide a vital station for defense, create instability among the centralists, and encourage Mexican federalists". The Mexican soldiers at Fort Lipantitlán intimidated the settlers in nearby San Patricio, leaving them afraid to openly support the federalists who defied Mexican president Antonio López de Santa Anna. Two of Dimmitt's men, John Wiliams and John Toole, had been captured on October 10 and 11 carrying missives to the federalist leaders in San Patricio and were imprisoned at Lipantitlán. Austin did not order an assault, and an angry Dimmitt wrote on October 27 that Williams and Toole had been sent to Matamoros, beyond the reach of the Texians. Dimmitt chose to act without orders from Austin and on October 31 sent Adjutant Ira Westover with a force of 35 men to take Fort Lipantitlán. Following the Battle of Lipantitlan, the Texians had defeated all of the Mexican forces within Texas except those commanded by Cos at Bexar. Without an easy means of communication with Matamoros in the Mexican interior, Cos was unable to quickly request or receive reinforcements or supplies. According to historian Bill Groneman, this likely contributed to Cos's defeat in the siege of Béxar. The removal of Mexican army oversight encouraged the federalists in San Patricio to become more active. These men soon gained control of the municipal government, formed a militia, and elected delegates to represent them at the Consultation, which served as a provisional Texas government.

Dimmitt was temporarily relieved of his command on November 18, 1835, after an incident involving Agustín Viesca, the deposed governor of Coahuila y Tejas. Viesca had been relieved of his duties and imprisoned after questioning Santa Anna's centralist policies. He escaped from prison and made his way to Texas, where he was discovered by Westover's men as they returned from Fort Lipantitlan. Westover took the governor to Goliad, where Dimmitt treated him courteously but refused to recognize his authority as governor. By this time, Dimmitt had decided that he preferred complete independence from Texas rather than a return to the previous Mexican constitution. Austin, who believed Texas was fighting for the Constitution of 1824, immediately removed Dimmitt from office. Dimmitt's men voted to keep him as their commander and released several resolutions in protest of Austin's action.

Dimmitt designed this flag supporting the Goliad Declaration of Independence

In early December, Dimmitt and a few of his men joined Austin's army at Bexar, where they participated in the final fighting at the siege of Béxar. They returned to Goliad about December 14. On his return, Dimmitt designed a new flag. This flag had a white background and featured a severed, bloody arm holding a sword. It is thought to be the first flag advocating Texas's full independence from Mexico. The flag was raised over Presidio La Bahia after the garrison approved and signed the Goliad Declaration of Independence. Many members of the government, as well as acting army commanders Frank W. Johnson and James Grant demanded that the flag be lowered. An angry Dimmitt resigned his command in mid-January 1836.

=== Alamo ===
About January 24, Dimmitt and thirty volunteers arrived in San Antonio de Bexar to reinforce the Texians garrisoned at the Alamo. He was named army storekeeper. Additional reinforcements from the regular army arrived on February 3, under the command of William B. Travis. Many of Dimmitt's men left after their arrival, but Dimmitt remained and worked as a scout. Early in the morning of February 23, local townspeople warned Travis that the Mexican army was very near to Bexar. Travis assigned one of his men to stand lookout in the bell tower of the San Fernando Church and warn him if Mexican soldiers appeared. Travis then asked Dimitt and Lieutenant Benjamin Noble to try to locate the Mexican army. At approximately 2:30 that afternoon the church bell began to ring as the lookout claimed to have seen flashes in the distance. Although Travis could still see nothing, since Dimitt and Noble had not returned he sent John Sutherland and John W. Smith on horseback to scout the area where the flashes had been seen. Within 1.5 miles (2.4 km) of the town, they saw the troops of the Delores Cavalry and returned to Bexar at a run. The Texians were completely unprepared for the arrival of the Mexican army, and scrambled about to gather food and supplies for the anticipated siege. By late afternoon Bexar was completely occupied by about 1500 Mexican troops, who quickly raised a blood-red flag signifying "No Quarter" above the San Fernando Church.

Dimmitt and Noble were still scouting the area. As they were returning to Bexar, a local told them that the town was surrounded. Soon after, a servant sent by Dimmitt's wife found them to tell them not to return or the Mexican army would kill them. The men rode to a nearby location to wait and see if it would be safe to return to the Alamo. After several days, Dimmitt concluded that the wait was in vain and he and Noble left the area.

=== San Jacinto ===
After leaving Bexar, Dimmitt returned to Victoria, where he began trying to recruit others to help relieve the Alamo. After hearing that the Texians had been defeated at the battle of the Alamo, the new commander of the Texian Army, Sam Houston, sent Dimmitt a letter on March 12, ordering Dimmitt to bring his men to Gonzales. By this time Dimmitt had recruited 21 men. By the time they arrived at Gonzales, the Mexican army had already taken possession of the town, as Houston and his men retreated east. Dimmitt's men briefly skirmished with Mexican troops before returning to Victoria on March 19. There, he and his men helped evacuate settlers. When Mexican General Jose de Urrea prepared to enter Victoria on March 21, Dimmitt and his men joined the settlers in fleeing east. The mass evacuation was later termed the Runaway Scrape.

On April 15, Dimmitt arrived at Matagorda Island with more recruits for Houston's army. On April 22, Dimmitt joined Houston, bringing with him reinforcements and much-needed supplies. The reinforcements missed the final battle of the revolution by only a day. Later on April 22, Santa Anna was taken prisoner, and the war essentially ended.

== Later years ==
Dimmitt later moved to Refugio and became a justice. In 1841 he purchased part of a ranch on the Aransas River. By May, he had formed a trading post with James Gourley Jr. near what was later Calallen and is now Corpus Christi, Texas. The post was about 15 miles (24 km) from one that had long been operated by William P. Aubrey and Henry Kinney, who dealt in contraband with Mexican troops. On July 4, 1841, Mexican troops raided Dimmitt's post, confiscating merchandise valued at $6,000 and taking Dimmitt and several other men captive. Dimmitt and the other men were sent to prison in Matamoros.

The troops did not approach Aubrey and Kinney's post. Some newspapers speculated that Kinney, who was friendly with Mexican general Pedro de Ampudia, had asked Ampudia to eliminate the competition. Aubrey and Kinney were eventually arrested and charged with treason, but were acquitted on August 22, probably due to pressure from Texas President Mirabeau B. Lamar. Within weeks, Lamar had sent Kinney to Mexico to petition for Dimmitt's release. The request was unsuccessful; the Mexican government was still angry with Dimmitt for his role in the Goliad Declaration of Independence and had no intention of releasing him.

Dimmitt and his friends, along with 19 other men from Texas who were imprisoned in Matamoros, were marched to Monterrey in August 1841. Eighteen of the men escaped in Saltillo after drugging their guards. Eleven of them were later found and executed, while seven reached safety in the mountains. Dimmitt had been held separately and did not participate in the escape, but he was told that if the other Texians did not return Dimmitt would be executed as revenge. Unhappy with either alternative—execution or extended imprisonment—Dimmitt committed suicide by taking an overdose of morphine.

== Legacy ==
Dimmitt had two children, Antonio Alamo Dimmitt and Texas Philip Dimmitt. In 1858, Texas created a new county which they named for him. Due to a mistake in the bill authorizing the county's creation, it is known as Dimmit County.
