= Agustín Viesca =

10th Governor of Coahuila y Tejas

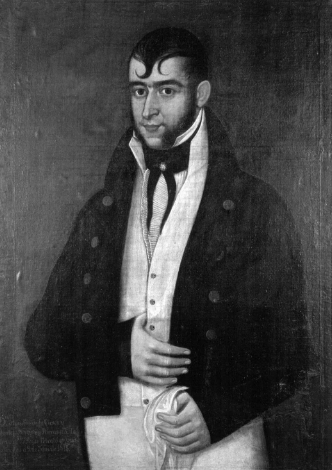
- Portrait of Agustin Viesca y Montes

10th Governor of Coahuila y Tejas
- In office 1835–1835
- Preceded by: José María Cantú
- Succeeded by: Marciél Borrego

Personal details
- Born: 1790 Villa de Santa María de las Parras, New Spain, Spanish Empire (now Parras de la Fuente)
- Died: 1845 (aged 54–55)
- Profession: Governor of Coahuila y Tejas

Agustín Viesca (1790–1845) was a governor of the Mexican state of Coahuila y Tejas in 1835. He was the brother of José María Viesca, also a governor of Coahuila y Tejas during 1827-1831.

== Administration in Texas ==
As Mexican President Antonio Lopez de Santa Anna began consolidating power in early 1835, the state government of Coahuila y Tejas defied his orders. In May, the army, which supported the government's new centralist policies, invaded the capital, Saltillo, and dissolved the state government. As their last official act, the legislature authorized the governor to temporarily appoint any other city in the state as the capital. Viesca immediately designated San Antonio de Bexar as the focus of the state government and issued a proclamation asking the people of Mexican Texas to arm themselves in support of the now overthrown Constitution of 1824.

Viesca and members of the government gathered important documents from the state archives and began the journey overland to San Antonio. They were caught and arrested near the Rio Grande. Later in the year, Viesca and his party were liberated by rebels under Colonel Jose Maria Gonzales. The group continued their journey into Texas, but rather than travel directly to San Antonio they took a coastal route towards Goliad, where Texians had recently gained control of Presidio La Bahia. After leaving San Patricio, Viesca met Texian troops led by Ira Westover, who had recently defeated another Mexican force at the Battle of Lipantitlan.

Westover escorted Viesca and his party to Presidio La Bahia. At that time that he arrived, the Texians had just convened the Consultation, a provisional government that was trying to determine if the Texians were fighting for the reinstatement of the Constitution of 1824 or for independence from Mexico. Although Viesca assumed that he would resume his position as leader of the area, La Bahia commander Philip Dimmitt was unsure how to receive the governor. Dimmitt sent a military escort to escort the party in with military honors and offered an official reception inside the fort. However, he wrote to Texian Army commander Stephen F. Austin that as "I did not conceived myself duly authorized to receive this gentleman in an official capacity, no such reception was either given or intended." Austin was very angry with Dimmitt's actions and on November 18 ordered Dimmitt removed from his command with no hearing. Viesca and his men journeyed to San Felipe de Austin, where the Consultation also refused to recognize his authority.

== See also ==
- List of Texas Governors and Presidents
