= Lipantitlan State Historic Site =

Lipantitlan State Historic Site Texas State Historic Site
- Lipantitlan State Historic Site (the United States)
- 27°57′52″N 97°49′6″W
- Location: East end, Nueces County Road 58, Orange Grove, Texas

History
- Designated: 1949

Site notes
- Area: 5 acres (2.0 ha)
- Governing body: Texas Parks and Wildlife Department
- Website: Lipantitlan State Historic Site

Lipantitlán State Historic Site is a 5-acre (2.0 ha) park located at FM 624 and 70 just east of Orange Grove in far northwestern Nueces County in the U.S. state of Texas. Fort Lipantitlán, meaning "Lipan land" was named for the Lipan Apaches who once inhabited the area. The 1835 Battle of Lipantitlán between Mexican and Texian forces was fought here.

== See also ==
- List of Texas State Historic Sites
- Battle of Lipantitlán
