= Consultation (Texas) =

Provisional government of Texas during the Texan Revolution (1835-36)

Texian Consultation
- Type: Republican General Council
- Status: De-established
- Precursor: Mexican Constitution of 1824
- Formation: November 1835
- Abolished: March 1836
- Succession: Governor, Lieutenant Governor, and General Council

The Consultation, also known as the Texian Government, served as the provisional government of Mexican Texas from October 1835 to March 1836 during the Texas Revolution. Tensions rose in Texas during early 1835 as throughout Mexico federalists began to oppose the increasingly centralist policies of the government. In the summer, Texians elected delegates to a political convention to be held in Gonzales in mid-October. Weeks before the convention and war began, the Texian Militia took up arms against Mexican soldiers at the Battle of Gonzales. The convention was postponed until November 1 after many of the delegates joined the newly organized volunteer Texian Army to initiate a siege of the Mexican garrison at San Antonio de Bexar. On November 3, a quorum was reached in San Antonio. Within days, the delegates passed a resolution to define why Texians were fighting. They expressed allegiance to the deposed Constitution of 1824 and maintained their right to form the General Council. In the next weeks, the council authorized the creation of a new regular army to be commanded by Sam Houston. As Houston worked to establish an army independent from the existing volunteer army, the council repeatedly interfered in military matters.

After authorizing an expedition to take Matamoros, Mexico, the council named several men, simultaneously, to organize and lead the assault, angry at the effect the expedition was having on existing Texian garrisons, Smith dissolved the council. Alleging that Smith did not have the authority to disband them, council members impeached him and lieutenant governor James W. Robinson was named acting governor.

== Background ==
The Mexican War of Independence (1810-1821) severed Spain's control over much of its North American territories, including Texas. The 1824 Constitution of Mexico defined the new country as a federal republic with nineteen states and four territories. Due to limited population and extremely poor economies, the provinces of Texas and Coahuila were combined to become the state Coahuila y Tejas. In the hopes that an influx of settlers could control the Indian raids, the new government liberalized immigration policies for the region. Under the General Colonization Law people from the United States could, for the first time, legally settle in Texas. Large tracts of land were granted to empresarios, who were responsible for recruiting settlers and establishing communities in Texas. With one exception, the new colonies were settled by foreigners. Tejanos, Texas residents of Mexican descent, were soon vastly outnumbered by Anglos. By 1834, an estimated 30,000 Anglos lived in Coahuila y Tejas, compared to only 7,800 Tejanos. By 1833, Texas was divided into three political divisions: the Department of Béxar, the Department of Nacogdoches, and the Department of the Brazos.

A map of Mexico, 1835–1846, showing administrative divisions. The red areas show regions where separatist movements were active.

By late 1834, the Mexican government began transitioning from a federalist model to centralism. Santa Anna overturned the 1824 Constitution, dismissed the state legislatures, and ordered all militias disbanded. Federalists throughout Mexico were appalled. The governor of Coahuila y Tejas, Agustín Viesca, refused to dissolve the legislature, instead ordering that the session reconvene in Béxar, further from the influence of the Mexican army. Viesca was arrested before he reached Texas. Citizens in the states of Oaxaca and Zacatecas took up arms.

Public opinion in Texas was divided. In June 1835, one group staged a minor revolt against customs duties in Anahuac. Resolutions by the city councils in Mina, Gonzales, Goliad, and Columbia denounced their actions. Civic leaders in Mina were so disgusted they called for public meetings to determine whether settlers supported independence, a return to federalism, or the status quo. Although some leaders worried that Mexican officials would see this type of gathering as a step toward revolution, the ayuntamientos of both Columbia and San Felipe quickly endorsed the suggestion. They hoped that a political convention would make it quite clear that the majority of Texians did not support the radicals. After the leaders of Columbia argued forcefully for the convention, the political chief of the department of the Brazos called for a meeting of representatives of municipalities in that department on August 1. Only four of the seven appointed delegates appeared. Discovering there was no official agenda, the four men returned home without actually doing anything.

As a response to the Anahuac disturbances, the commander of the Mexican army in Texas, Domingo de Ugartechea, requested reinforcements to help capture the dissidents. Small groups of soldiers began arriving in early August; in response, local municipalities formed Committees of Correspondence and Safety and unofficial militias. On August 9, citizens at a public meeting in Brazoria again broached the idea of a larger political convention. Other communities debated whether to participate in such a convention, and whether its goals should be simply an exchange of opinions or to create an interim government. The proposed political gathering, which became known as the Consultation, was endorsed by Stephen F. Austin, the first empresario in Texas, on September 8, which solidified support throughout the Anglo colonies. Austin became the de facto leader of the Consultation, making plans for the gathering, which would convene on October 15. He requested that each community send one delegate early, to form a Permanent Council to start gathering opinions.

In the interim, hostilities between Mexican soldiers and Texian colonists increased, and in early October Texian Militia attacked a Mexican army contingent which had been sent to retrieve a cannon that had previously been loaned to Gonzales. This small skirmish marked the official start of the Texas Revolution. Gonzales became a rallying point for Texas settlers who opposed the centralist policies, and men flocked to the town. On October 11, the Texian Militia formed themselves into a volunteer Texian Army and elected Austin as their commander. Many of the Consultation delegates had also gathered in Gonzales, and rather than wait for the session to begin, they joined the army on a march against the Mexican garrison at Béxar.

By October 16, only 31 delegates had arrived in San Felipe, short of a quorum. Most expected the siege of Béxar to be over very quickly, so the Consultation was postponed until November 1. In the interim, this group of delegates granted power to the Permanent Council, which in practice included representation from only seven districts. The Permanent Council made weak attempts to govern the area, but primarily carried out Austin's orders. In its most controversial move, the council closed all land offices in the region on October 27, to prevent speculators from seizing land during the unrest.

The siege of Béxar began in late October. Newly arrived immigrant Sam Houston traveled to Béxar to exhort the delegates to leave the siege and come to the Consultation. In a compromise, the officers voted to allow delegates who were members of the rank-and-file or were line officers to leave the siege, while those who were staff officers would remain to oversee military operations. William B. Travis, William Wharton, and Stephen F. Austin remained behind, while twenty delegates, including James Bowie, accompanied Houston to San Felipe.

== Delegates ==
Each municipality in Texas was encouraged to send five delegates to the convention. Some municipalities, including Nacogdoches, elected seven. A total of 98 delegates were elected. These men were established citizens, with an average length of residence of seven years, with an average age of 38. Approximately one-third of the delegates were staunch supporters of the Constitution of 1824, another third strongly advocated independence, and the remainder were unaligned.

Only 58 of these men attended. None of the delegates from the war areas - Béxar, Goliad, Refugio, Victoria, and San Patricio - appeared. This effectively ensured that there were no Tejano delegates. Many delegates from the other regions of Texas remained in the army or stayed home to defend their families. Because Austin and many of his Peace Party supporters were still with the army at Bexar, they were unable to provide as much influence to the gathering as expected.

An overwhelming percentage of the delegates who attended were men who had previous political experience. Twenty of them had been active in the Communities of Correspondence and Public Safety in their respective towns.

== Formation of government ==
A quorum finally formed on November 3, and delegates continued to arrive over the next few days. Although Austin had endorsed Lorenzo de Zavala to preside over the gathering, delegates elected Branch Tanner Archer of Brazoria. In a speech after his appointment, Archer urged his comrades "to divest yourselves of all party feelings, to discard every selfish motive, and look alone to the true interest of your country." Before the group could move towards official business, Houston rose to a make speech. He gave thanks to many for actions taken over the recent months. His eloquence was unimportant and unnecessary, except as a means for him to become better known to the other delegates. For the remainder of the day, the delegates drafted rules of order. Similar to those used in the legislative bodies of the United States and Europe, the rules emphasized courtesy. In an unusual move, the rules prohibited delegates from abstaining from voting. As president, Archer was forbidden from voting except to break a tie.

The Consultation's main purpose was to decide the overall goals of the revolution. Members of the War Party advocated for complete independence from Mexico, while Peace Party representatives wished for Texas to remain part of Mexico, but only under the 1824 Constitution of Mexico. Although Austin was unable to attend, he did send a letter to the consultation, asking them to follow the Constitution of 1824 and to make it clear to Mexico that the hostilities were not an attempt for independence but instead a determination to fight for their rights as Mexican citizens.

On November 4, John Wharton was named chair of a committee to determine the purpose of the war. After three full days of deliberation failed to produce a resolution, delegates began a full debate on the floor. The turning point of the discussion came when Houston, who many believed to be a staunch member of the War Party, asked the fellow delegates to refrain from declaring independence. Such a declaration would likely cause many of the people who supported the Constitution of 1824 in other parts of Mexico to refrain from supporting the Texians. The Consultation compromised. On November 7, they released a resolution declaring that "The people of Texas, availing themselves of their natural rights, solemnly declare that they have taken up arms in defense of their rights and liberties which were threatened by the encroachments of military despots and in defense of the Republican principles of the federal constitution of Mexico of 1824." The resolution further specified that Texas reserved the right to create an independent government as long as Mexico was not governed by that document. The members hoped that this wording would allow them to gain support from both federalists within Mexico and from the United States. The resolution passed 33–14.

In what historian William C. Davis dubbed "the three shortest yet perhaps most significant resolutions in the document," the delegates agreed that Texas would pay for the army, would repay any goods purchased by its agents, and would give volunteers public lands. These were powers reserved for states, and under the Constitution of 1824 Texas was not a stand-alone state. With these words, delegates violated the very constitution they had sworn to uphold. Davis asserts that this provision signified that the delegates fully intended for Texas to become an independent nation, eventually.

Fifty-seven delegates signed the resolution. de Zavala translated it into Spanish, and copies in both languages were ordered to be printed and distributed to residents. A committee was immediately established to design a provisional government, with Henry Smith as chair. The committee's first proposal was a near-verbatim copy of the preamble to the United States Constitution and included a statement that Texas was now a "sovereign state". Delegates voted against this draft and insisted that the committee membership be changed. All committee members who supported independence were removed from their positions, and the new committee began deliberations anew. On November 13, this group produced a document that won approval.

The new government would consist of a chief executive and a General Council who would share powers. Under the assumption that these two branches would have full cooperation, there was no system of checks and balances. Believing there was no time to wait for general elections, the Consultation determined that the governor and lieutenant governor would be chosen by the delegates themselves, a practice somewhat common among states in the United States. Although Austin was nominated, he lost to Smith 31–22. James Robinson was elected lieutenant governor. As lieutenant governor, Robinson would preside over the General Council, which would consist of one representative from each municipality.

Three delegates-Austin, Archer, and Wharton-were appointed as agents to the United States to try to raise money and volunteers. Austin immediately resigned his post as commander of the volunteers; the troops elected Edward Burleson as their new leader. Houston was appointed to the Select Committee on Indian Affairs, as he had spent much of his career dealing with Indian nations. The Texians needed the support of the Indians (or at least their neutrality) to win their fight against Mexico.

The Consultation officially adjourned on November 15, leaving the new provisional government in charge.

== General Council ==
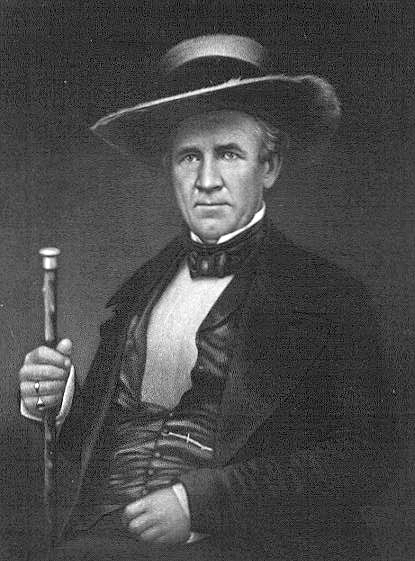
Sam Houston was named commander of the new Texian Army.

The soldiers currently fighting near Béxar were volunteers, who joined the army to accomplish a specific task and staunchly maintained their right to elect their own leaders. On November 13, the council officially established a regular army. Houston was appointed to command this new Provisional Army of Texas, subject to the orders of the governor. Houston was instructed to raise an army from scratch; because the volunteers had organized before the Consultation convened, they could not be forced to accept Houston as their commander. The new army should consist of 2,500 men, who would enlist for 2-year terms in exchange for land grants.

After consulting with some of the officers currently at the siege of Béxar, notably Travis and James W. Fannin, the council chose to expand the army. On December 5 they created a Corps of Permanent Volunteers, which would have a shorter enlistment period and more autonomy. This move hindered Houston's efforts to fill his regular army; most citizens preferred to join the Permanent Volunteers.

On December 11, the Mexican troops in Béxar surrendered and agreed to march south of the Rio Grande. With their departure, there was no longer an organized garrison of Mexican troops in Texas, and many of the Texians believed that the war was over. Burleson resigned his leadership of the army on December 15 and returned to his home. Many of the men did likewise, and Frank W. Johnson assumed command of the 400 soldiers who remained.

The Mexican retreat gave the council the time to formalize the government and begin planning for the future, without the threat of attack. Little was accomplished. The new Texas government had no funds, so the military was granted the authority to impress any supplies that would be useful. This policy soon resulted in an almost universal hatred of the council, as food and supplies became scarce, especially in the areas around Goliad and Béxar, where Texian troops were stationed. The Telegraph and Texas Register noted that "some are not willing, under the present government, to do any duty...That our government is bad, all acknowledge, and no one will deny."

Citing an aborted coup attempt on November 25, Smith proposed a bill making it treasonous to make threats against the provisional government. The council, by now used to "the governor's addiction to exaggerated and inflammatory rhetoric", ignored him. On December 19, a group of prominent citizens, led by Moseley Baker, Wylie Martin, and William Pettus, held a meeting in San Felipe to build support for dismantling the provisional government. They were concerned that the council was moving too seriously towards independence instead of an adherence to the Constitution of 1824. Yet the council had not gone far enough for some. Disillusionment with the interim government and an increased militancy among troops, whose ranks were now primarily composed of newly arrived volunteers from the United States, led to calls for a new convention. Brazoria passed a resolution asking for a convention to meet in March 1836 to declare independence. Soldiers in Goliad went a step further and drafted a declaration of independence on December 22. The Council passed a resolution to call the Convention of 1836, to meet on March 1 in Washington-on-the-Brazos.

=== Matamoros Expedition and collapse ===
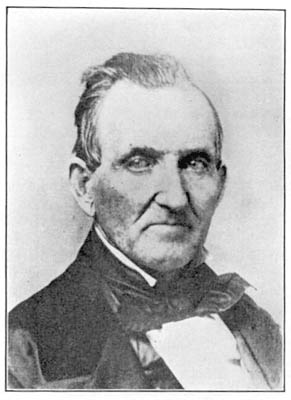
Lieutenant Governor James W. Robinson became governor after the council impeached Henry Smith.

In mid-November Governor Viesca, who had been freed by sympathetic soldiers, reached Goliad. The commander at Goliad, Philip Dimmitt welcomed Viesca but refused to recognize his authority as governor. This caused an uproar in the garrison; many supported the governor, while others believed that Texas should be an independent country and should therefore not recognize the Mexican governor. Viesca traveled to San Felipe to meet with the General Council, who also refused to recognize his authority as governor. Viesca joined several others in advocating a plan to attack centralist troops in Matamoros. They hoped this Matamoros Expedition would inspire other federalist states to revolt and keep the bored Texian troops from deserting the army. Most importantly, it would move the war zone outside of Texas. The governor initially supported the plan, and asked Houston to organize the expedition; Houston appointed James Bowie to lead the expedition, but Bowie did not receive his orders for several weeks. The Council asked Burleson, the commander of the volunteers at Bexar, to lead the expedition. Burleson had already resigned, and his elected replacement, Johnson, instead received the message. While Johnson journeyed to San Felipe to meet with the council, on December 30, Johnson's aide-de-camp, James Grant led 200 men from Béxar to travel to Goliad to prepare for the expedition. Only 100 Texians remained at the Alamo Mission in Bexar, under the command of Lieutenant Colonel James C. Neill. Neill was disgusted that Johnson had stripped the Alamo of almost all provisions and the majority of the men and sent a strong message to Houston asking for reinforcements and more supplies.

Although Bowie also appeared before the council with his written orders from Houston to lead the Matamoros Expedition, on January 6 the Council authorized Johnson to lead the expedition. Johnson initially declined the commission, but changed his mind the following day. Without revoking Johnson's commission, the Council elected Fannin to lead the mission instead. Smith was incensed when he learned the council had appointed their own commander for the expedition, and he became even more angry when Houston forwarded the letter from Neill, with an added note that he believed the Johnson mission was illegal, as the council had not had a quorum when it was authorized. By now, both Smith and Houston had decided that the expedition had little chance of success.

Smith denounced the expedition as idiocy and labelled its supporters either fools or traitors. He then disbanded the council until March 1 unless they agreed to renounce the Matamoros Expedition. The council determined that Smith had no authority to dismiss them. They soon impeached Smith and named the lieutenant governor, Robinson, Acting Governor. The documents forming the provisional government, however, did not grant the council the authority to impeach the governor.

On January 12, Smith wrote a conciliatory letter to the council: "I admit that I [used] language beyond the rules of decorum", and declared that if the council would admit that their actions regarding the Matamoros Expedition were wrong he would reinstate them so that "the two branches [would] again harmonize to the promotion of the true interests of the country". Weary of the infighting and unsure who was actually in charge, Council members slowly stopped appearing. In the hopes of salvaging a government, Robinson appointed four members to an Advisory Committee. Soon, this dwindled to only two members. The interim government was essentially over by the end of January.

== See also ==
- Timeline of the Texas Revolution
- Texian Militia
- Texian Army
- Texian Navy
