= Goliad Declaration of Independence =

1835 document

The Goliad Declaration of Independence was signed on December 20, 1835, at Presidio La Bahía in Mexican Texas.

"Bloody arm" flag flown over Presidio La Bahía at the signing of the Goliad Declaration of Independence.

The declaration lists several complaints centering around the growing threat to Texian settlers from the recently centralized Mexican government and calls for a convention to draft a constitution.

Three resolutions are enumerated in the declaration:

1. The former province and department of Texas is a free, sovereign and independent State.
2. Texas has all the powers, faculties, attributes, and immunities of other independent nations.
3. The signers pledge their lives, fortunes, and sacred honor to sustain the declaration.

The declaration was signed by 91 Texian and Tejano settlers in the Gulf Coast of Mexico settlements which supported breaking away from Mexico and creating an independent state.

While the document drafted by Matagorda alcalde (mayor) Ira Ingram was a precursor to the Texas Declaration of Independence, it was deemed premature when received by the Consultation in San Felipe de Austin.

There was not yet a clear consensus among Texians for either declaring outright independence or remaining part of Mexico with the restoration of the 1824 Mexican Constitution. It was effectively quashed by sending it to the Committee on State and Judiciary, and was later just filed away.

== See also ==
- Coahuila y Tejas — Mexican state in region, 1824-1836.
- Mexican Texas period — 1821-1836.
