= Centralized government =

Government with power concentrated at the higher level

A centralized government (also united government) is one in which both executive and legislative power is concentrated centrally at the higher level as opposed to it being more distributed at various lower-level governments. In a national context, centralization occurs in the transfer of power to a typically unitary sovereign nation state. Executive and/or legislative power is then minimally delegated to unit subdivisions (state, county, municipal and other local authorities). Menes, an ancient Egyptian pharaoh of the early dynastic period, credited by classical tradition with uniting Upper and Lower Egypt, and as the founder of the first dynasty (Dynasty I), is considered by some to be the first ruler to institute a centralized government.

All constituted governments are, to some degree, necessarily centralized, in the sense that even a federation exerts an authority or prerogative beyond that of its constituent parts. To the extent that a base unit of society – usually conceived as an individual citizen – vests authority in a larger unit, such as the state or the local community, authority is centralized. The extent to which this ought to occur, and the ways in which centralized government evolves, forms part of social contract theory.

== See also ==
- Authoritarianism
- Centralization
- Decentralized system
- Decentralization
- Unicameralism
- Unitary state
- Democratic centralism
