= John Files Tom =

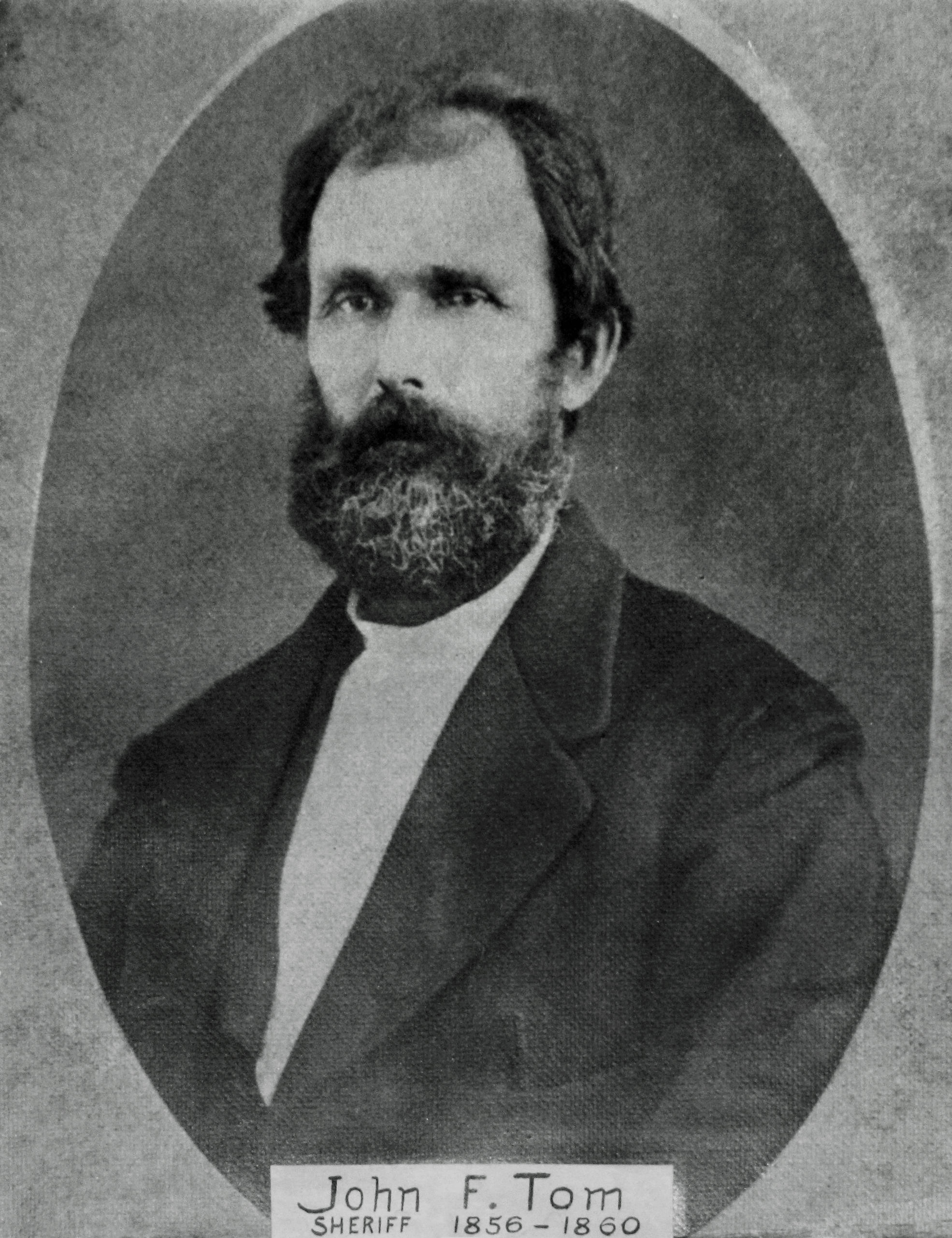
- Born: April 22, 1818; Maury County, Tennessee
- Died: March 26, 1906 (aged 87) Leakey, Texas
- Allegiance: Texas

John Files Tom (April 22, 1818 – March 26, 1906) was an American soldier, sheriff and legislator. A notable figure in Texas history, he served as soldier in the Texas Revolutionary War and as Texas Ranger Captain during the Civil War. He was also sheriff of Guadalupe County, Texas, and later became a representative in the 13th Texas State Legislature.

== Early life ==
John Files Tom was born on April 22, 1818, in Cathey's Creek in Maury County, Tennessee to William Tom and Mary Susan Files Tom. The Tom Family, descended from Irish immigrants, moved to Texas from Tennessee in 1835 and settled at Washington-on-the-Brazos. William Tom brought a letter of good character signed by 36 people from Tennessee, which was double certified by the Maury County Clerk and the Governor of Tennessee.

== Texas Revolution ==
In 1835, when Captain Phillip Coe's Texas Ranger company under the command of Col. John Henry Moore was called to help with the Battle of Gonzales, John Files' father initially stayed home to protect the women, children and livestock from potential Indian attacks. When his father eventually left for Stephen F. Austin's volunteer army, John Files decided to enlist with him. They joined Austin's army on the way to San Antonio and participated in the battle of Concepción and the Grass Fight. During the siege of Bexar, John Files Tom was a gunner boy with Col. James C. Neill's artillery, while his father fought with Ben Milam.

The Toms stayed in San Antonio until February 11, 1836, when they left to assist with the evacuations of civilians known as the Runaway Scrape. In March 1836, John Files Tom left his father to join General Sam Houston's army on the Colorado River and was placed in Captain W. W. Hill's company.

The Battle of San Jacinto occurred on April 21, 1836, the day before Tom's eighteenth birthday. He was part of the charge yelling "Remember the Alamo" and "Remember Goliad", but he was hit in the knee cap by a large musket ball and fell out of line into a hog wallow. The battle lasted a mere eighteen minutes, but the killing of Mexican soldiers continued through the night. Milt Swisher and Louis Clemens had noted where John Files Tom fell and eventually came back for him, carrying him to the home of Lorenzo de Zavala, where he recovered from his injury. The New Orleans Bulletin newspaper office mistakenly listed Tom as killed in battle. After a few weeks of recovery, he rode his horse home to reunite with his family.

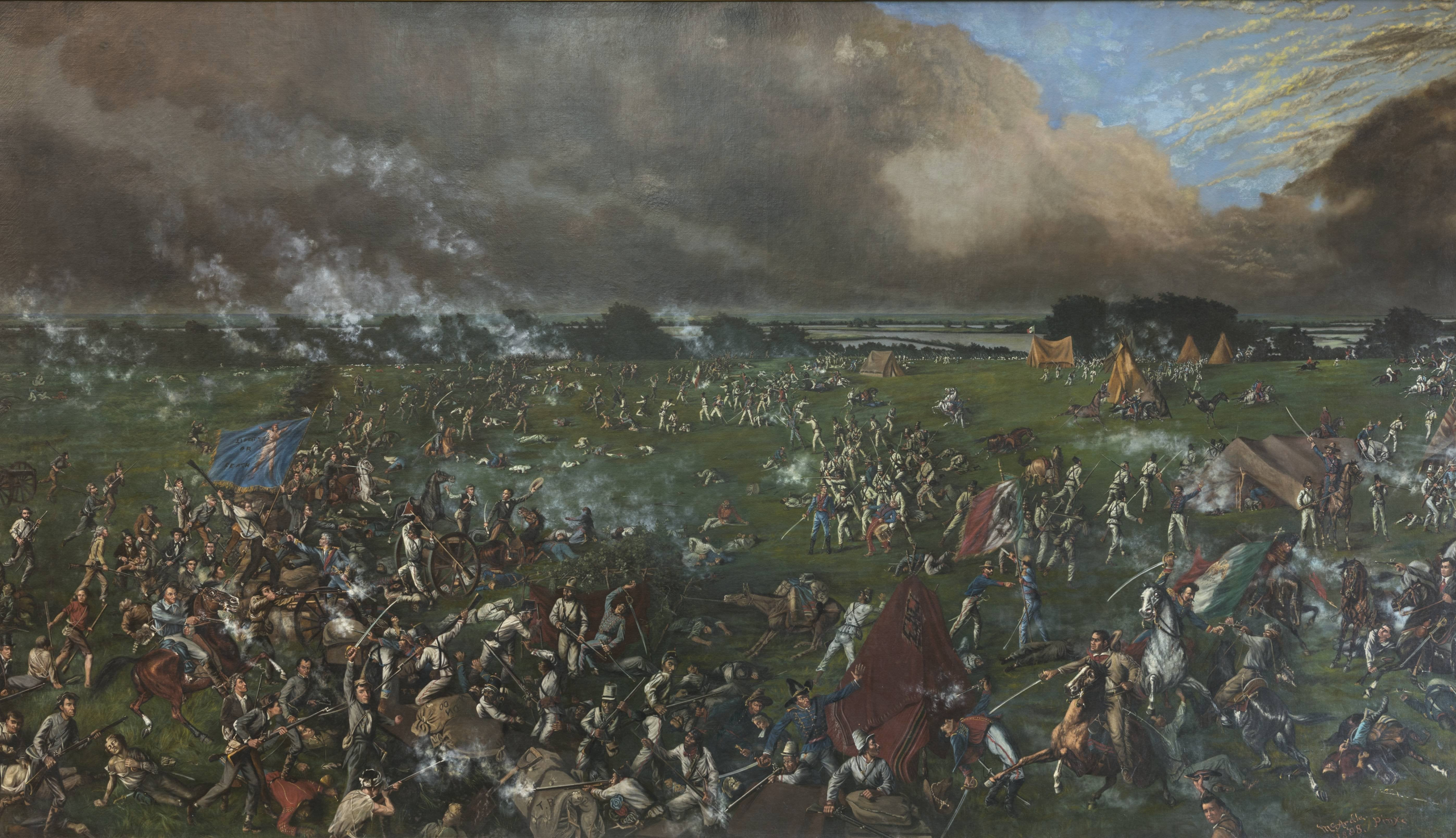
According to the McArdle notebooks at the Texas State Library and Archives, John Files Tom appears among the Texans depicted in this painting.

== Sheriff in Guadalupe County ==
In 1839, John Files Tom met Mary Ann Moffitt, a schoolteacher originally from Pennsylvania. They were married on July 2, 1840.

The Tom family moved to Seguin, Texas in 1846. John Files Tom was elected as Sheriff of Guadalupe County on August 4, 1856, and re-elected on August 2, 1858, serving until August 6, 1860. While in Guadalupe County, Tom had a cattle ranch where he employed James Henry East, who went on to be part of Sheriff Pat Garrett's posse that captured Billy the Kid.

== Texas Ranger in the American Civil War ==
John Files Tom began his experience as a Texas Ranger in 1861 as a private in Captain Claiborne Rector's company. His family had a long history of Texas Rangers, including his father William Tom, his brothers William Jr, Alfred, Houston, and George W Tom, his cousin Hugh Simpson Tom, brother-in-laws Jordan Alexander Irvin, John Gladden King Jr and Riley Lewis and son-in-laws Edward Campbell, William Green Winsett, and Charles Harrison Long.

In 1864, Tom was commissioned to organize his own company of Texas Rangers for Frontier Defense during the Civil War. John Horton Slaughter was a notable member of Captain John Files Tom's company in the fight against the Comanches.

== Post-Civil War ==
After the civil war, John Files Tom joined Captain Leander H. McNelly of the Texas State Police (Texas Rangers) on the Rio Grande Expedition in 1872.

Tom had been made a Mason in 1867, and was raised in 1871 at Pleasanton Lodge No. 283. He was later active at Jeptha Lodge No. 469 where he served as Treasurer in 1877 and again from 1880 to 1881. He was last affiliated with Leakey Lodge No. 622 in 1891 and was an active member until his death.

Tom was elected to the Texas House of Representatives in the 13th Texas State Legislature serving in the position for District 30 from January 14, 1873, to January 13, 1874. The 13th Texas State Legislature were known as the "Liberators of Texas" because they ended reconstruction in Texas. John Files Tom was part of the Coke-Davis Controversy, where the upper floor of the Capitol building was held until Governor Davis accepted the election results and left office.

== Later life and death ==
Mary Ann (Moffitt) Tom became ill while visiting her daughter Sarah Caroline (Tom) Winsett and died on June 23, 1873 at age 53 in the Old Rock Church community in Atascosa County. Her children with John Files Tom were Mary Jane (Tom) Campbell, Charles Alfred Tom, Sarah Caroline (Tom) Winsett, Harrietta Louisa (Tom) Long and Emily Catherine (Tom) Dewees.

Not long after her death, John Files Tom began to search for a new wife, and on December 17, 1873, was married to Nancy Henderson. They had nine children together including William Winsett Tom, Ida Jane (Tom) Howell, Julia Anne (Tom) Godbold, John F. Tom, William Burgess Tom, John Ireland Tom, Myrtle Ola (Tom) Orrell, and Jessie Lavesta (Tom) Bonner Godbold.

The family moved to Leakey, Texas along the Frio River in 1890 before Real County was formed. In 1893, Tom broke his leg while attempting to dismount from his horse. This injury coupled with his injury from the Battle of San Jacinto caused him to use crutches.

On March 26, 1906, John Files Tom died at the age of 87 at his ranch home in Leakey, Bandera County, Texas.
