= James C. Neill =

American soldier and politician

James Clinton Neill

Member of the Alabama House of Representatives from the Greene County district
- In office November 21, 1825 – January 13, 1827
- Preceded by: Zachariah Merriweather; Ezekiel Pickens
- Succeeded by: Edward Broadnax Colgin; D. B. Richardson

Personal details
- Born: 1788 Rowan County, North Carolina, U.S.
- Died: 1848 (aged 59–60) Grimes County, Texas, U.S.
- Spouse: Margaret Harriett (m. 1807; died 1836)

Military service
- Allegiance: United States; Republic of Texas
- Branch/service: U.S. Army; Texian Army; Texas Army
- Years of service: 1812-1844
- Rank: Colonel
- Unit: West Tennessee Militia, Republic of Texas Regular Army, Militia, and Texas Rangers
- Commands: San Antonio de Béxar and the Alamo, The Army of Texas at Gonzales
- Battles/wars: War of 1812; Creek War; Battle of Horseshoe Bend; Texas Revolution; Battle of Gonzales; Siege of Bexar; Runaway Scrape; Battle of San Jacinto; Texas-Indian wars

James Clinton Neill (c. 1788 – 1848) was an American soldier and politician, most noted for his role in the Texas Revolution and the early defense of the Alamo. He was born in North Carolina and served in the Alabama House of Representatives between 1825 and 1827.

== Early life and career ==
James Clinton Neill was born in 1788 in Rowan County, North Carolina, the third child (and third son) of James Neill and Hannah Clayton Neill. William Clinton Neill (James Clinton's grandfather), was a captain in the American Revolution, who along with five of his sons, including James Clinton's father James, fought in the War for Independence. James Clinton's uncle, Lieutenant William Neill, was killed at the Battle of Ramsour's Mill. The Clinton middle name comes from both his paternal grandfather and grandmother, Captain William Clinton Neill and his wife Mary "Polly" Clinton Neill.

By at least 1807, some members of the James Neill family had moved to south-central Tennessee, in and around Bedford and Marshall counties. In this vicinity, James Clinton married Margaret Harriett Ferguson in 1807. It is likely that James Clinton Neill was acquainted with a near-neighbor around those parts at the same time, David Crockett, another Tennessean who would become a Texas Revolution hero. Like Crockett, J.C. Neill fought in the Creek Indian War, enlisting with the West Tennessee Militia (protecting present day Alabama). He enlisted on October 1, 1813, and was discharged on March 15, 1815. He participated in the latter part of the War of 1812, during the Creek War. Although wounded, he fought in the decisive battle against the Red Sticks, at the Battle of Horseshoe Bend.

Neill served as a captain under Major William Woodfolk. The battalion was designated as "Separate Battalion of West Tennessee Militia". This battalion was based at Fort Jackson most of the time from late November 1814 to early 1815. Some of the men were stationed at Fort Decatur, where the remnants of the defeated Creek Nation came to surrender, seeking food and supplies (surrendering Creeks also went to Fort Jackson). One company, under Captain Abner Pearce, was stationed at Fort Montgomery. Woodfolk was a wealthy land speculator who owned a large plantation in Jackson County. In addition to potentially sharing time with Davy Crockett, during this military service James Clinton Neill may well have also met his future Texas Revolution commander, Sam Houston. He lived in Tennessee (present day Alabama) with his wife Margaret Harriett, who bore him three children – George Jefferson Neill (b. 1808), Samuel Clinton Neill (b. 1815) and Harriett (b. 1820).

=== Alabama legislature ===
By at least 1820, J.C. Neill had moved his family to Greene County, Alabama. He served as a member of the Alabama House of Representatives representing Greene County in the 7th and 8th annual session and was also a justice of the peace in Jackson County. He was appointed to the House Military Committee by Speaker William Kelly on November 23, 1825. He introduced a bill intended "to more effectually prevent Sabbath breaking", which lost in a 14-48 vote on December 21, 1825.

== Texas Revolution ==
The family moved to Texas in 1831 with Stephen F. Austin's third colony where he received a league of land (4,428) acres. They settled in (Viesca District) which is now Milam County. Neill served as a district representative in the Convention of 1833.

=== Militia captain ===
Due to his previous experience in battle, Neill had some knowledge of artillery. In 1834 Neill and his family moved to Mina, modern day Bastrop. On September 28, 1835, when armed conflict with Antonio López de Santa Anna's Mexican troops seemed inevitable, he joined the Texian militia as a captain of artillery. On October 2, 1835, he saw action at the conflict at Gonzales. Texian John Holland Jenkins recorded that Neill actually fired the famed Gonzales "Come and Take It" cannon, crediting him with firing "the first shot of the Texas Revolution."

After Gonzales, James would move onwards to the Alamo and join with Stephen F. Austin's forces in the Siege of Bexar. From December 5–10, Neill's battery provided covering fire for the assault on San Antonio de Béxar. He had gained an additional artillery piece from the Battle of Concepción and two more from the New Orleans Grays. They would be placed in the Texian post, just west of the Alamo, confronting the town, however their fire could not shake Cos from Bexar. Then, Neill and his command formed a plan. They took a cannon across the San Antonio River and fired upon the Alamo as a diversionary tactic. The plan worked and the Texians were able to enter into Bexar. House to house fighting would eventually push the Mexicans back and into the Alamo. On December 8, the Mexican Army made a counterattack, Neill and his crew were there to answer back with canister-shot from their cannons. The flying hailstorm of iron would quickly end the advance, ultimately resulting in the surrender of the Mexican forces on December 9.

=== Military officer ===
On December 7, the Texas General Council had commissioned Neill lieutenant colonel of artillery in the regular Texian army. Having received several captured Mexican field pieces to augment his firepower, he now commanded over twenty artillery pieces, the largest amount west of the Mississippi River and north of the Rio Grande. Neill had been recommended for the commission by one of his neighbors, D. C. Barrett, who wrote to Texian Army commander Sam Houston that "age and experience with his militia rank & title, would seem to justify his first commission as a field officer".

=== Alamo commander ===
On December 21, 1835, Houston requested that Neill, now a lieutenant colonel of an artillery company, take command of the Texian and Tejano garrison stationed at the Alamo Mission in San Antonio de Bexar. The orders also specified that Neill should make a report to Houston detailing the current state of the defenses in the city and what improvements were needed.

The Texian garrison was woefully undermanned and underprovisioned, with fewer than 100 soldiers remaining by January 6, 1836. Neill wrote to the provisional government: "If there has ever been a dollar here I have no knowledge of it". Neill requested additional troops and supplies, stressing that the garrison was likely unable to withstand a siege greater than four days. The Texian government was in turmoil and unable to provide much assistance. (Note: A week after Neill sent his letter, the Texian provisional legislature impeached the governor, who in turn disbanded the legislature. The interim constitution had given neither party the authority to take those actions, and no one in Texas was entirely sure who was in charge. (Todish et al. (1998), pp. 30–1.)) Four different men claimed to have been given command over the entire army; (Note: Houston, James Fannin, Frank W. Johnson, and Dr. James Grant (Todish et al. (1998), p. 30.)) on January 14 Neill approached Houston for assistance in gathering supplies, clothing, and ammunition.

On January 17, 1836, James Bowie arrived to evaluate the situation, with the suggestion from Sam Houston to remove the artillery and blow up the Alamo. Houston had written the Provisional Government asking for approval of his orders. Houston sent Bowie to San Antonio because he trusted Bowie's opinion. Instead of leaving the Alamo and falling back to Gonzales or Copano Bay, Bowie and Neill became committed to its defense. Bowie, impressed with Neill's leadership, wrote, "No other man in the army could have kept men at this post, under the neglect they have experienced." Despite Houston's orders to have the Alamo destroyed as indefensible, Neill and Bowie vowed "... we will rather die in these ditches than give it up to the enemy." However, Neill was soon badly in need of supplies, as well as soldiers.

On February 11, Neill left the Alamo, to care for his family, overcome with a serious illness. He transitioned command to William Barret Travis, the highest-ranking regular army officer in the garrison. Due to a rift in the command of the Alamo between Bowie and Travis, Neill returned to the Alamo on February 14 and settled the dispute. A resolution was reached; Bowie and Travis would hold joint command of the Alamo. Neill would leave San Antonio just before the siege of the Alamo. On the day of the final Alamo battle, Neill was in Gonzales steadily working to increase the roster of the Alamo relief forces. In Gonzales, he signed a personal voucher on March 6, for ninety dollars to buy medicine for the Alamo garrison. Neill was intent on heading back to the Alamo where, unknown to him, the fort had already fallen to Mexican troops on March 6, during the Battle of the Alamo. On March 7, Neill with Burleson gathered 50 men and headed for the Alamo. They came close to the Alamo but were repulsed by Mexican cavalry. Neill returned to Gonzales on March 10 after leaving a small party of scouts to observe, who also returned to Gonzales the next day.

=== Army commander ===
From late February until Houston's arrival on March 11, Neill had been in command of the relief troops gathering at Gonzales. Two days later, on March 13, word was received that the Alamo had fallen. Thus, Neill once again relinquished his command and joined the withdrawal of Sam Houston's army to Groce's Retreat on the Brazos River. Unable to transport their cannons, Houston ordered them dumped into the Guadalupe River before abandoning Gonzales. That changed on April 11 when the "Twin Sisters" —two matched six-pounders— reached the Texian camp. The brass cannons were a gift from the people of Cincinnati, Ohio. Since Neill was a ranking artillery officer, Houston named him to command the revived artillery corps. On April 20, Neill commanded the Twin Sisters during the Battle of San Jacinto. (Note: Neill did command the Twin Sisters cannons on April 20th, but this was during a skirmish on the day before the final battle took place.) During this fight, his artillery corps repulsed an enemy probe of the woods in which the main Texian Army was concealed. Neill was seriously wounded when a fragment of a Mexican grapeshot caught him in the hip. The final Battle of San Jacinto was fought on April 21.

== Later life ==
1838: received a league of land (including a parcel in Henderson County along the confluence of Walnut Creek and the Trinity River) for his services during the revolution.

1839: ran for the position of major general of militia, losing to newcomer Felix Huston.

1842: led a ranging expedition along the upper Trinity River, to control hostile Indians.

1844: appointed as an Indian agent, responsible for vast areas of Texas.

1845: granted a lifetime pension of $200 a year, as compensation for San Jacinto injuries.

=== Death ===
In 1848, he died at his home on Spring Creek in Navarro County, Texas, and was buried next to his wife, who had died near Seguin, Texas, in February 1836.

=== Legacy ===
On land owned with two partners, David Reed Mitchell and Thomas I. Smith, one hundred acres was donated on which the town of Corsicana, Texas, would be founded in 1848.

In 1936 a Texas centennial marker was placed in Guadalupe County, Seguin, Texas in his honor.

In 1986 a Texas sesquicentennial marker was placed in Navarro County, Corsicana, Texas in his honor.

== Sources ==
- Barr, Alwyn, Texans in Revolt: The Battle for San Antonio, 1835, University of Texas Press; ISBN 0-292-78120-2
- Davis, William C., Lone Star Rising: The Revolutionary Birth of the Texas Republic, Free Press; ISBN 0-684-86510-6
- Hardin, Stephen L., Texian Iliad: A Military History of the Texas Revolution, University of Texas Press; ISBN 0-292-73086-1
- King, C. Richard, James Clinton Neill, The Shadow Commander of the Alamo, Eakin Press; ISBN 1-57168-577-4
- Nofi, Albert A., The Alamo and the Texas War for Independence, Da Capo Press; ISBN 0-306-80563-4
- Lindley, Thomas Ricks (2003), Alamo Traces: New Evidence and New Conclusions, Lanham, MD: Republic of Texas Press, ISBN 1-55622-983-6
- Todish, Timothy J.; Todish, Terry; Spring, Ted (1998), Alamo Sourcebook, 1836: A Comprehensive Guide to the Battle of the Alamo and the Texas Revolution, Austin, TX: Eakin Press, ISBN 978-1-57168-152-2
- Winders, Richard Bruce (2004), Sacrificed at the Alamo: Tragedy and Triumph in the Texas Revolution, Military History of Texas Series: Number Three, Abilene, TX: State House Press, ISBN 1-880510-80-4
