= Siege of Béxar =

Siege during the Texas Revolution

- Part of the Texas Revolution
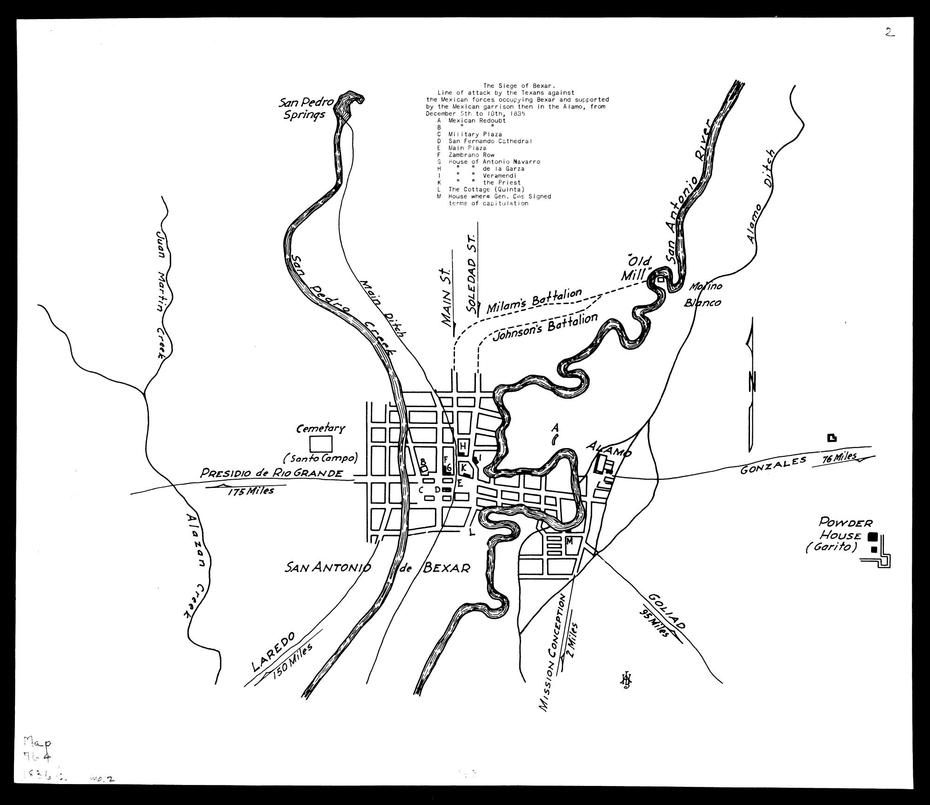
- Map depicting the assault on San Antonio de Bexar by Texian forces on December 5, 1835.
Date	October 12 – December 11, 1835 (1 month, 4 weeks and 1 day)
Location	modern-day San Antonio, Texas, U.S.
Result	Texian victory

Belligerents
Mexico	Texian Rebels

Commanders and leaders
Martín Perfecto de Cos (surrendered); Domingo Ugartechea (surrendered); Francisco de Castañeda (surrendered)	Stephen F. Austin; Thomas J. Rusk; Edward M. Burleson; Benjamin R. Milam †; Francis W. Johnson

Strength
1,200	600

Casualties and losses
150 killed or wounded, 750 captured	35 killed, wounded & captured

The siege of Béxar (or Béjar) was an early campaign of the Texas Revolution in which a volunteer Texian army defeated Mexican forces at San Antonio de Béxar (now San Antonio, Texas). Texians had become disillusioned with the Mexican government as president and General Antonio López de Santa Anna's tenure became increasingly dictatorial. In early October 1835, Texas settlers gathered in Gonzales to stop Mexican troops from reclaiming a small cannon. The resulting skirmish, known as the Battle of Gonzales, launched the Texas Revolution. Men continued to assemble in Gonzales and soon established the Texian Army. Despite a lack of military training, well-respected local leader General Stephen F. Austin was elected commander.

Santa Anna had sent his brother-in-law, General Martín Perfecto de Cos, to Béxar with reinforcements. On October 13, Austin led his forces towards Béxar to confront the Mexican troops. The Texians initiated a siege of the city.

== Background ==
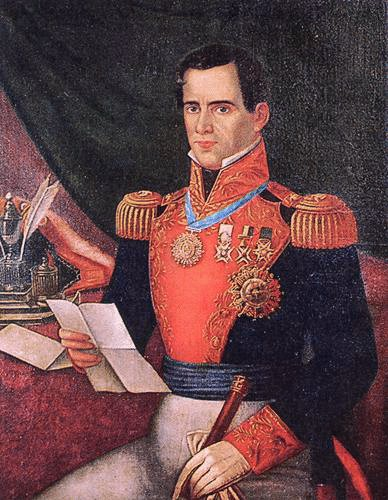
General Antonio López de Santa Anna's centralist policies, such as ending slavery and immigration, fomented rebellion throughout the Mexican states.

In 1835, federalists in several interior Mexican states revolted against the increasingly centralist reign of Mexican President Antonio López de Santa Anna. The Texians were primarily immigrants from the United States who held about 5,000 slaves in a total non-native population estimated at 38,470. They staged a minor revolt against customs duties in June, and colonists and immigrants soon began forming militias to protect themselves, the land they occupied, and the slaves they continued to hold contrary to Mexican law. As protests spread across Texas, Mexican officials increasingly blamed the settlers from the United States for the discontent. As historian Alwyn Barr notes, many of the new settlers had "lived entirely within growing Anglo colonies... and had made few adjustments to the Spanish traditions of Mexico.

Domingo Ugartechea, the military commander at San Antonio de Béxar sent a force of 100 soldiers under Francisco de Castañeda to reclaim a small cannon that had been given to the citizens of Gonzales. The request angered the Texians, who immediately sent couriers to other Anglo communities to ask for assistance. For several days the Texians stalled and reinforcements began to arrive. On October 2, the Texians attacked the Mexican force; under orders to avoid bloodshed, Castaneda and his men withdrew. This Battle of Gonzales is considered the official opening of the Texas Revolution. Encouraged, a small group of Texians then went to Goliad, where, at the Battle of Goliad, they succeeded in driving off the small Mexican force garrisoned at Presidio La Bahia.

Fearing that strong measures were needed to quell the unrest, Santa Anna ordered General Martín Perfecto de Cos to lead a large force into Texas. When Cos arrived in San Antonio on October 9 there were 647 soldiers ready for duty. When Goliad fell to the Texians, Cos lost his line of communication to the coast. Convinced that the Texians would soon attack San Antonio, he chose to take a defensive position rather than launch an attack against the Texian army.

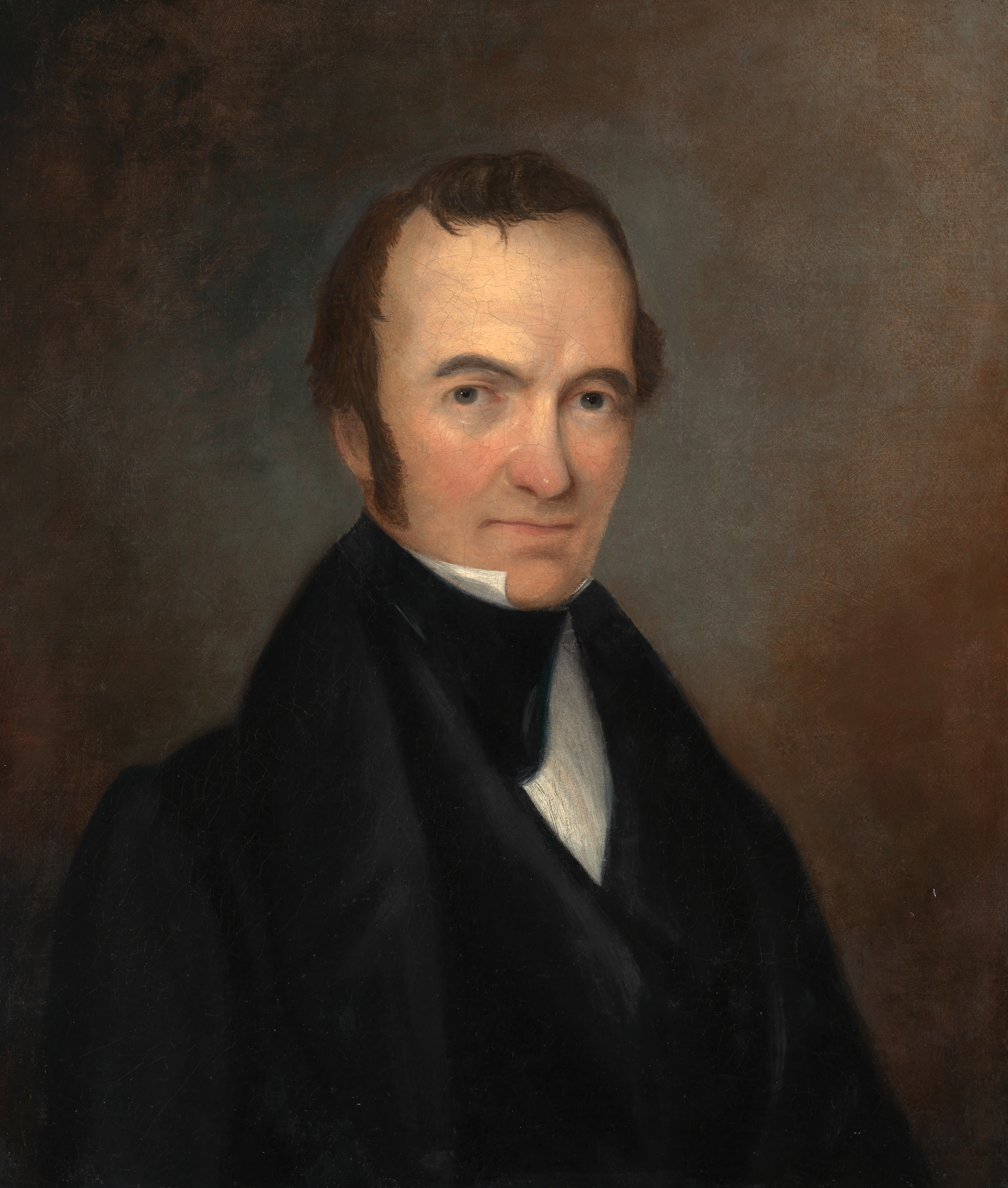
Stephen F. Austin was elected to lead the new Texian Army.

Two days after the Texian victory at Gonzales, respected Texian leader Stephen F. Austin reported to the San Felipe Committee of Public Safety that "War is declared—public opinion has proclaimed it against a Military despotism—The campaign has commenced". His letter concludes: "One spirit and one purpose animates the people of this party of the country, and that is to take Béxar, and drive the military out of Texas. ... A combined effort of all Texas would soon free our soil of Military despots." Colonists continued to assemble in Gonzales, and on October 11 they unanimously elected Austin, the first empresario granted permission to settle Anglos in the state, as their commander in chief. Although Austin had no official military training, he was widely respected in Texas for his sound judgement, and he had led several excursions against raiding Native American tribes, such as the Karankawas.

Austin's first order was that the men should be prepared to march at 9 am the following morning. For the rest of the day, the men practiced firing and retreating in lines. Austin issued a string of orders, including barring men from indiscriminately firing their weapons and instructing them to keep their weapons in good repair at all times. He also felt it necessary to, in his words "remind each citizen soldier that patriotism and firmness will but little avail, without discipline and strict obedience. The first duty of a soldier is obedience." A later order instructed that "All riotous conduct and noisy clamorous talk is specially prohibited". Austin also organized elections for regimental officers. John H. Moore, who had led the Texians in the Battle of Gonzales, was elected colonel. Edward Burleson, a former militia officer in Missouri and Tennessee, was named lieutenant colonel, and Brazoria merchant Alexander Somervell was elected major.

On October 12, the Texian army numbered approximately 300 men, drawn primarily from Austin's colonies and the DeWitt Colony. About half of the men had entered Texas in the 1820s; the others were newer arrivals who had lived in the area less than 5 years. Several had official militia experience while they lived in the United States, and others had joined companies within Texas to counter Indian raids. Almost all of the men were proficient with firearms, as hunting was a primary source of food. The men crossed the Guadalupe River that morning and paused to await further reinforcements from Nacogdoches. On October 13, Austin led the Texian Army toward San Antonio de Béxar, location of the last large garrison of Mexican troops in Texas. Some of the Texians had no weapons; those that did had little gunpowder or shot. As the army marched, Ben Milam formed a makeshift mounted company to scout ahead. On October 15, one of the scouting parties briefly skirmished with a ten-man Mexican cavalry patrol; no injuries were reported and the Mexican soldiers soon retreated to Béxar.

The Texians arrived at Cibolo Creek, several miles east of Béxar, on October 16. Austin requested a meeting with Cos, but Cos declined to meet with a man he said was commanding an illegal force. A Texian council of war decided to remain in place and wait for reinforcements. The following day they reversed their decision, and Austin moved his army to Salado Creek, 5 miles (8.0 km) from Béxar. Over the next several days, reinforcements and supplies arrived from various English-speaking colonies. One of the new companies, commanded by James C. Neill, brought 2 new six-pounder cannon with them. The reinforcements brought the Texian official strength to 453 men, although only about 384 of them were available for duty. On October 24, Austin wrote the Committee of Public Safety in San Felipe that he had "'commenced the investment of San Antonio", and that with additional reinforcements he believed the town could be taken in a matter of days.

Meanwhile, Cos worked to fortify the town squares in San Antonio and the walls of the Alamo, a mission-turned-fort near the town. By October 26, Cos's men had mounted 11 cannon—5 in the town squares and 6 on the walls of the Alamo. An eighteen-pounder cannon, with a much longer range than the other Mexican artillery, was positioned inside the Alamo chapel. Additional Mexican soldiers arrived in Béxar, and on October 24 the Mexican garrison stood at its highest number, 751 men. Although the Mexican soldiers attempted to restrict access to and from the city, James Bowie was able to leave his home and join the Texians. Bowie was well known throughout Texas for his fighting prowess; stories of his exploits in the Sandbar Fight and his search for the lost San Saba mine were widely reported. Juan Seguin, a government official in San Antonio, arrived with 37 Tejanos on the morning of October 22, and later that day an additional 76 men joined the Texian Army from Victoria, Goliad, and the ranches south of Béxar. According to Barr, the presence of the Tejanos helped to "blur the essence of ethnic conflict", providing evidence that the Texian response was not simply an overreaction by American immigrants.

== Siege ==
=== Investment ===
Even with the additional men, Austin realized that his army was not large enough to prevail in a full assault on Béxar. The Texians thus prepared for a siege, looking for a position that was, in the words of historian Stephen L. Hardin, "near Béxar, yet defensible against a sortie; in a position to block enemy communications arriving daily". On October 22, Austin named Bowie and Captain James Fannin (Note: Fannin was one of the very few Texian soldiers with formal military training; he had briefly studied at the U.S. Military Academy. Hardin (1994), p. 29.) co-commanders of the 1st Battalion and sent them on a reconnaissance mission. By the end of the day the Texians had seized the Espada mission from Mexican pickets. On October 24, Austin informed the Committee of Public Safety that he had initiated a siege; in his opinion, the city could be taken in a few days if Texian reinforcements arrived quickly.

Austin sent Bowie and Fannin to find another good defensive spot on October 27. Rather than return immediately to Austin, as their orders specified, Bowie and Fannin instead sent a courier to take Austin directions to their chosen campsite, the former Mission Concepción. The scouting party camped along the San Antonio River near the mission, which was approximately 2 miles (3.2 km) from San Antonio de Béxar and 6 miles (9.7 km) from the Texian camp at Espada. An angry Austin, fearing that his army would be easily defeated now that it was split, issued a statement threatening officers who chose not to follow orders with court-martial. He ordered the army to be prepared to join Bowie and Fannin at first light.

Hoping to neutralize the Texian force at Concepción before the remainder of the Texian Army arrived, Cos ordered Colonel Domingo Ugartechea to lead an early-morning assault on the forces at Concepcion on October 29. The Texians had a good defensive position, surrounded by trees, which left the Mexican cavalry no room to maneuver. The Mexican infantry soon found themselves outgunned. The Texians were short of ammunition. The Battle of Concepción lasted only 30 minutes; at that point the Mexican soldiers retreated towards Béxar.

Less than 30 minutes after the battle ended, the rest of the Texian Army arrived. Austin felt that the Mexican morale must be low after their defeat and wanted to proceed immediately to Béxar. Bowie and other officers refused, as they believed Béxar was too heavily fortified. The Texians searched the area for any Mexican equipment which had been abandoned during the retreat. They found several boxes of cartridges. Complaining that the Mexican powder was "little better than pounded charcoal", the Texians emptied the cartridges but kept the bullets. One Texian, Richard Andrews, died and one was wounded, while estimates of the Mexican dead range from 14 to 76.

On November 1, Austin sent a note to Cos, suggesting that the Mexican army surrender. Cos returned the note unopened, with a message that he refused to correspond with rebels. Austin sent men to reconnoiter the town's perimeter and discovered that the fortifications within the city were stronger than the Texians had believed. On November 2, Austin called a council of war, which voted to continue the siege and wait for reinforcements and more artillery before attacking. Members of the Texian army were impatient to begin the fighting. Austin complained to the provisional government on November 4 that "This force, it is known to all, is but undisciplined militia and in some respects of very discordant materials." He followed this note with a strong plea that "In the name of Almighty God, send no more ardent spirits to this camp!"

=== Consultation ===
The siege continued, and soon additional reinforcements arrived under Thomas J. Rusk, bringing the Texian army to 600. Cos also gathered reinforcements, bringing the Mexican army to 1,200 and discouraging the Texians even further from making any direct assaults on the city.

Sam Houston arrived in San Felipe expecting to gather for a meeting of the Consultation government, but since many of the members were fighting in the siege of Béxar, Houston instead went to the Texian army outside San Antonio. When Houston arrived in the camp, Austin offered him command of the army, but Houston declined and went ahead gathering the members of the Consultation. The members were released from the army for the meeting (except for Austin and William B. Travis) and returned to San Felipe. There the delegates agreed to fight to uphold the Constitution of 1824 rather than Texas' independence. Houston was named general-in-chief of all Texas forces, except those fighting around San Antonio, and Stephen Austin was authorized to travel to the U.S. to gain support for their cause. Edward Burleson, who had been serving as Austin's second-in-command, was elected major general and commander-in-chief of the volunteer army to replace Austin.

=== Grass Fight ===
The Texian people had little or no experience as professional soldiers, and by early November many had begun to miss their homes. As the weather turned colder and rations grew smaller, many soldiers became sick, and groups of men began to leave, most without permission. On November 18, however, a group of volunteers from the United States, known as the New Orleans Greys, joined the Texian Army. Unlike the majority of the Texian volunteers, the Greys looked like soldiers, with uniforms, well-maintained rifles, adequate ammunition, and some semblance of discipline. The Greys, as well as several companies of Texians who had arrived recently, were eager to face the Mexican Army directly. Encouraged by their enthusiasm, on November 21, Austin ordered an assault on Béxar the following morning. Several of his officers polled the soldiers that evening and discovered that fewer than 100 men were willing to launch an attack on Béxar; Austin then cancelled his orders. Within days Austin resigned his command to become a commissioner to the United States; Texians elected Burleson as their new commander.

On the morning of November 26, Texian scout Erastus "Deaf" Smith rode into camp to report that a pack train of mules and horses, accompanied by 50–100 Mexican soldiers, was within 5 miles (8.0 km) of Béxar. For several days, the Texians had heard rumors that the Mexican Army was expecting a shipment of silver and gold to pay the troops and purchase additional supplies. The Texians had been fighting without pay, and most wanted to charge from camp and loot the expected riches. Burleson ordered Bowie to investigate but warned him not to attack unless necessary. After Bowie recruited the army's 12 best marksmen for the expedition, there was little doubt that he intended to find a reason to attack. Burleson managed to stop the entire army from following by sending Colonel William Jack with 100 infantry to support Bowie's men.

About 1 mile (1.6 km) from Béxar, Bowie and his men spotted the Mexican soldiers crossing a dry ravine. This was likely near the confluence of the Alazán, Apache, and San Pedro Creeks. After a short battle, the Mexican soldiers withdrew towards Béxar, leaving their pack animals behind. To the surprise of the Texians, the saddlebags contained not bullion, but freshly cut grass to feed the Mexican horses trapped in Béxar. Four Texians were wounded in the fighting, and one soldier deserted during the battle. Estimates of the number of Mexican casualties ranged from 3–60 killed and 7–14 wounded. Their victory allowed the Texians to believe that, although outnumbered, they could prevail over the Mexican garrison. The Texians believed that Cos must have been desperate to send troops outside of the safety of Béxar.

== Battle ==
=== Attack ===
Texian morale began to drop severely, and with winter approaching and supplies running low, Burleson considered withdrawing into winter quarters. In a council of war, Burleson's officers overruled his decision to withdraw, and the army stayed. One of the officers who adamantly opposed the withdrawal was Colonel Ben Milam. Undaunted, Milam stalked into the Texian camp and called out "Who will go with old Ben Milam into San Antonio?" 300 soldiers cheered their support for Milam.

Reports from a captured Mexican soldier and escaped Texian prisoners alerted Burleson that Mexican morale was just as low. Burleson ordered a two-column attack. One attack was to be carried out by Milam's troops, and the other was to be carried out by those of Colonel Francis W. Johnson. On December 5, Milam and Johnson launched a surprise attack and seized two houses in the Military Plaza (one of the houses seized belonged to the in-laws of Jim Bowie). The Texians were unable to advance any further that day, but they fortified the houses and remained there during the night, digging trenches and destroying nearby buildings.

On December 7, the attack continued, and Milam's force captured another foothold in the city. However, Milam was killed while leading the attack. Colonel Johnson subsequently took command of both his and Milam's men and continued the street fighting, gradually driving the Mexicans back into the city. Cos withdrew into the Alamo, where he was joined by Colonel Ugartechea and 600 reinforcements, but it was too late. Cos entrenched his position, and Texian artillery pounded the fortified mission.

As the Texians advanced closer to the plazas, Cos realized that his best defensive position would be within the Alamo Mission just outside Béxar. In his official report to Santa Anna, Cos wrote that ""In such critical circumstances there was no other measure than to advance and occupy the Alamo which, due to its small size and military position, was easier to hold. In doing so, I took with me the artillery, packs and the rest of the utensils I was able to transport.” At 1 am on December 9, the cavalry began to pull back towards the Alamo. Colonel Nicolas Condell, his small force of 50 men from the Morelos and Tamaulipas units, and two cannon remained as the rear guard at the plaza. Years later, however, Sanchez Navarro maintained that Cos was not planning to abandon the town but wished to move the wounded to the relative safety of the Alamo.

Inside the Alamo, Cos presented a plan for a counterattack; cavalry officers believed that they would be surrounded by Texians and refused their orders. Possibly 175 soldiers from four of the cavalry companies left the mission and rode south. According to Barr, Cos ran after the horsemen to tell them to stop and was almost run down. For a brief period, those in the mission believed that Cos might have been killed. Sanchez Navarro said the troops were not deserting but misunderstood their orders and were withdrawing all the way to the Rio Grande.

=== Surrender ===
By daylight, only 120 experienced infantry remained in the Mexican garrison. Cos called Sanchez Navarro to the Alamo and gave him orders to "go save those brave men. ... Approach the enemy and obtain the best terms possible". Sanchez Navarro first returned to his post at the plaza to inform the soldiers of the imminent surrender. Several officers argued with him, explaining that "the Morelos Battalion has never surrendered", but Sanchez Navarro held firm to his orders. Bugle calls for a parley received no response from the Texians, and at 7 am Sanchez Navarro raised a flag of truce.

Father de la Garza and William Cooke came forward to escort Sanchez Navarro and two other officers to Johnson, who summoned Burleson. When Burleson arrived two hours later, he found that the Mexican soldiers did not have written authorization from Cos. One of the Mexican officers was sent to bring back formal permission for the surrender. Burleson agreed to an immediate cease-fire, and negotiations began. Johnson, Morris, and James Swisher represented the Texians, while José Miguel de Arciniega and John Cameron interpreted. The men haggled for much of the day before reaching terms at 2 am on December 10.

According to the terms of the agreement, Mexican troops could remain in the Alamo for six days to prepare for the trip to the Mexican interior. During that time frame, Mexican and Texian troops were not to carry arms if they interacted. Regular soldiers who had established ties to the area could remain in Béxar; all recently arrived troops were expected to return to Mexico. Each Mexican soldier would receive a musket and ten rounds of ammunition, and the Texians would allow one four-pound cannon and ten rounds of powder and shot to accompany the troops. All other weapons and all supplies would remain with the Texians, who agreed to sell some of the provisions to the Mexicans for their journey. As the final term of their parole, all of Cos's men were required to pledge that they would not fight against the Constitution of 1824.

At 10 am on December 11, the Texian army paraded. Johnson presented the terms of surrender and asked for the army's approval, stressing that the Texians had little ammunition left to continue the fight. Most of the Texians voted in favor of the surrender, although some termed it a "child's bargain", too weak to be useful.

== Aftermath ==
The siege of Béxar was the longest Texian campaign of the Texas Revolution, and according to Barr, it was "the only major Texian success other than San Jacinto", the latter of which would lead to subsequent victory of the Texian conflict and independence. According to Barr, of the 780 Texians who had participated in some way in the battle, between 30 and 35 were wounded, with 5 or 6 killed. Historian Stephen Hardin places the Texian casualties slightly lower, with 4 killed and 14 wounded. The losses were spread evenly amongst Texas residents and newcomers from the United States. Although some Texians estimated that as many as 300 Mexican soldiers were killed, historians agree that it likely that a total of 150 Mexican soldiers were killed or wounded during the five-day battle. About two-thirds of the Mexican casualties came from the infantry units defending the plazas. To celebrate their victory, Texian troops threw a fandango on the evening of December 10. Governor Henry Smith and the governing council sent a letter to the army, calling the soldiers "invincible" and "the brave sons of Washington and freedom". After the war, those who could prove they had participated in this campaign were granted 320 acres (130 ha) of land. Eventually, 504 claims were certified. At least 79 of the Texians who participated later died at the Battle of the Alamo or the Goliad Massacre, and 90 participated in the final battle of the Texas Revolution, at San Jacinto. The Texians confiscated 400 small arms, 20 cannon, and supplies, uniforms, and equipment. During the siege, Cos's men had strengthened the Alamo mission, and the Texians chose to concentrate their forces within the Alamo rather than continue to fortify the plazas.

Cos left Béxar on December 14 with 800 men. The soldiers who were too weak to travel were left in the care of the Texian doctors. With his departure, there was no longer an organized garrison of Mexican troops in Texas, and many of the Texians believed that the war was over. Johnson described the battle as "the period put to our present war". Burleson resigned his leadership of the army on December 15 and returned to his home. Many of the men did likewise, and Johnson assumed command of the soldiers who remained. Soon after, a new contingent of Texians and volunteers from the United States arrived with more heavy artillery. According to Barr, the large number of American volunteers "contributed to the Mexican view that Texian opposition stemmed from outside influences. That belief may have contributed in turn to Santa Anna's order of no quarter in his 1836 campaign." Santa Anna was outraged that Cos had surrendered. Already in preparations to move a larger army to Texas, Santa Anna moved quickly on hearing of his brother-in-law's defeat, and by late December 1835 he had begun to move his Army of Operations northward. Although many of his officers disagreed with the decision to march towards the Texian interior rather than take a coastal approach, Santa Anna was determined to first take Béxar and avenge his family's honor.

== See also ==
- List of Texas Revolution battles
- Timeline of the Texas Revolution
