= Phyllis Robinson (politician) =

American politician

Phyllis Marie Robinson (born September 11, 1946) is an American retired politician.

Robinson was born on September 11, 1946, in Gonzales, Texas. She attended Southwest Texas State University, graduating in 1967, after which she completed a master's degree at St. Mary's University in 1972. Before running for the Texas House of Representatives, Robinson was a teacher. From 1983 to 1991, Robinson held office as a conservative Democrat. She was the first woman to represent state house district 31.
