= William Stubbs (disambiguation) =

William Stubbs (1825–1901) was an English historian and Bishop of Oxford.

William Stubbs may also refer to:

- William Stubbs (Canadian politician) (1847–1926), member of the Canadian House of Commons
- William Stubbs (interior designer), American interior designer, host of PBS show A Moment of Luxury
- William Stubbs (trade unionist) (died 1914), English trade union leader
- Sir William Stubbs (educator), educator and former Rector of the University of the Arts, London
- William L. Stubbs (1917–2003), American Republican Party politician
- William Pierce Stubbs (1842–1909), marine painter in Boston, Massachusetts
- William Stubbs (English MP) for Yarmouth (Isle of Wight) (UK Parliament constituency)
