= Old Eighteen =

Old Eighteen may refer to:

- The first class of eighteen officer cadets of the Royal Military College of Canada
- Eighteen Texians who instigated the Battle of Gonzales
