= Domingo Ugartechea =

Mexican army officer (c.1794–1839)

Domingo de Ugartechea (c. 1794 – 24 May 1839) was a Mexican Army officer for the Republic of Mexico.

== Biography ==
=== Early years ===
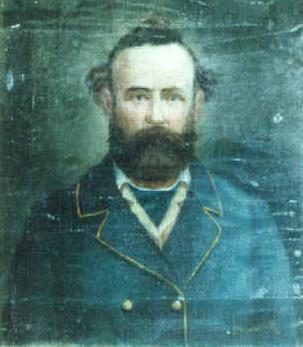
Domingo Ugartechea officer for the Centralist Republic of Mexico

Born c. 1794, Ugartechea served for José Joaquín de Arredondo in 1813. Ugartechea as well as Antonio López de Santa Anna were cadets during the suppression of the Gutiérrez–Magee Expedition, and at the Battle of Medina.

In June 1832, Ugartechea commanded 125 men at the fort at Velasco, Texas; he attempted to employ his artillery to prevent rebelling Texas colonists under John Austin from taking cannon from Brazoria to Anahuac at the time of the Anahuac disturbances. Although defeated by the Texans in the eleven-hour Battle of Velasco, Ugartechea was permitted to evacuate the fort.

In 1835, Ugartechea was military commandant of Coahuila and Texas in command of the forces at Presidio San Antonio de Béxar, all the while struggling with deficiencies in funding, supplies, and manpower. Although 200 men appeared on his rolls, only half that number were in active service. His observations from this position in the spring of that year contributed to the hardening of attitudes in Mexico concerning Anglo-American abuse of land policies and of native Tejanos in the departments of Nacogdoches and Bexar. He also considered the Texans to be disrespectful toward the government and its leaders, writing in one letter: "Nothing is heard but God damn St. Anna. God damn Ugartechea."

In mid-May 1835, Ugartechea worked through the political authorities to avoid armed conflict with the militiamen under Juan Seguín, who departed from the town of Bexar toward Monclova, Coahuila, to aid federalist Governor Agustín Viesca. Only last-minute concessions from political chief José Ángel Navarro prevented a clash between the militia and Ugartechea's soldiers. Subsequently, Ugartechea received and passed on to Mexico many reports that the spirit of conciliation was growing in summer 1835 and that the greatest threat to a consensus favoring peace would be to bring more troops from Mexico to Texas. However, at the end of July Ugartechea expressed his opinion to his superior, Martín Perfecto de Cos, that reinforcements were still quite necessary. In this way Ugartechea both reflected and furthered the hardening of attitudes that brought about war.

In dealing with the people of Texas, Ugartechea continued to issue reassurances about the potential for peace if his arrest orders were carried out. Those whom he ordered the Texas authorities to detain and hold included representatives to the Coahuila legislature, leaders of the Anahuac expedition or rebellion of June 1835, and other opponents of centralism such as Lorenzo de Zavala. During the course of the summer the units under his command grew to nearly 500 men, including about 200 cavalry on active duty. In September, reports circulated that Ugartechea intended to execute these arrests himself. Indeed, it was under his orders that Lt. Francisco de Castañeda went to Gonzales, Texas, to secure a cannon from the hands of the Texans, leading to the battle on October 2 that initiated hostilities in the Texas Revolution. Ugartechea then urged peace but warned the Texans to surrender their arms or face a renewed advance from San Antonio.

=== Siege of San Antonio ===
During the siege of Béxar, Stephen F. Austin conducted the Texan forces from the outskirts of the town, while Ugartechea at first remained with the Mexican forces in town. A unit of his cavalry engaged in reconnoitering around Cibolo Creek in mid-October. He then led a body of 275 infantry with two cannons from the town on the morning of October 28, precipitating the Battle of Concepción. Colonel Ugartechea commanded a unit of cavalry that slipped through the siege forces on November 12 and made its way in about ten days to the Rio Grande (Río Bravo) to seek reinforcements. On November 26, he guided a force of 454 conscripts and 173 veteran troops from Laredo to relieve the centralist army under Cos at Bexar. Their arrival on December 8, actually increased the burden of supply on the centralist army and helped to precipitate its surrender on December 9, to the Texans.

=== Texas Revolution ===
Ugartechea returned to Laredo with Cos's forces. He came back to Texas with the Mexican army in 1836. In late March Ugartechea received command of the inexperienced troops left in reserve at Copano, Victoria, and Goliad, making his headquarters in the latter place, and having responsibility for reconstructing shelter for the garrison and activating fortifications. Following the Mexican retreat after the Battle of San Jacinto, Ugartechea went to Matamoros, Tamaulipas, where he reportedly helped initiate the policy of persuading Native Americans to make war against the people of Texas. He continued to support the centralist cause, helping defeat a federalist uprising at Saltillo, Coahuila, from his post in Monterrey, Nuevo León, in February 1839. He was killed in defense of Saltillo on May 24, 1839.
