= Green DeWitt =

Empresario in Mexican Texas (1787–1835)

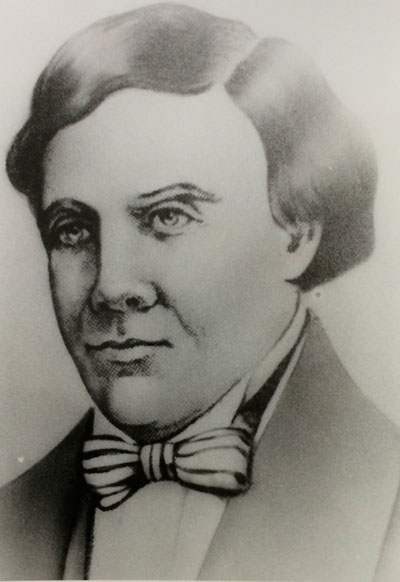
- circa 1820
- Born: Green DeWitt; February 12, 1787; Lincoln County, Virginia (now part of Kentucky), US
- Died: May 18, 1835 (aged 48); Monclova, Coahuila, Mexico
- Occupations: Sheriff of Ralls County, MO 1821-1824
- Known for: Empresario founded DeWitt Colony
- Spouse: Sara Seely
- Children: 6

Green DeWitt (February 12, 1787 – May 18, 1835) was an empresario in Mexican Texas. He brought families from the United States to what is now south-central Texas and founded the DeWitt Colony.

== Missouri ==
Green Dewitt was elected as the first Ralls County, Missouri, sheriff in 1821 and served for three years before heading to Texas for adventures that would make him an icon of American history. During his tenure as sheriff, the first courthouse and jail were housed in a log structure built in 1822. The jail was two rooms on the first floor, one a dungeon with no windows, the other a cell with a barred window. Both were entered by trap doors from the courtroom above. An area surrounding the jail a half-mile square was marked off as "prison bounds", so inmates could work outdoors. He served as sheriff until 1824. In March 1825, he headed to Texas to make his fortune.

== Texas empresario ==
In 1822, DeWitt petitioned the Mexican government for permission to settle colonists in Texas, but was denied. After teaming up with Stephen F. Austin, an influential Texas empresario, the government authorized DeWitt's contract in April 1825. He was given permission to settle 400 respectable, industrious, Catholic families in an area bounded by the Guadalupe, San Marcos, and Lavaca Rivers. This colony was southwest of the one founded by Austin.

DeWitt hired James Kerr as his surveyor. Kerr placed the capital, called Gonzales after Rafael Gonzales, provisional governor of Coahuila y Tejas, at the confluence of the San Marcos and Guadalupe Rivers. The first settlers arrived in the summer of 1825. DeWitt visited the colony in October, but spent much of 1825 in Missouri recruiting settlers. DeWitt was accused of misappropriation of funds in San Antonio, Texas, by settler Peter Ellis Bean, but was exonerated on October 16, 1825. Sarah DeWitt, whose Brooke County, Virginia, family was quite wealthy, contributed to her husband's endeavors, selling off some of her property in Missouri to help finance his venture.

In July 1826, Gonzales was raided by Native Americans looking for horses. Most of the settlers fled temporarily to Austin's colony. Although the colonization laws specified that settlements should not be established within 10 leagues of the coast, DeWitt gained permission from the authorities to establish a temporary settlement, which they called Old Station, on Matagorda Bay near the mouth of the Lavaca River. The settlement was allowed there until enough colonists had arrived to secure their safety in Gonzales. By October 1826, 40 people lived in Old Station, including Dewitt and his family. His family there included his wife, two sons, and three of his four daughters; one daughter had already married in Missouri.

Because the Mexican government had made an error and included another colony in the contract grant, DeWitt had numerous disputes with another empresario, Martín De León. At one point, DeWitt was arrested by authority of the Mexican government, because De León claimed that tobacco being shipped into his colony was contraband. Stephen Austin stepped in and helped reduce tensions, but the damage caused to the relationship of DeWitt and De León would never be repaired. After arresting DeWitt, Mexican authorities ordered that Old Station be abandoned and sent the settlers to Gonzales.

In 1827, DeWitt joined Austin and De Leon in signing a peace treaty with the Karankawa so their colonies would be safe from raiding. Each of these colonies had been encroaching on Karankawa territory, particularly along the rivers on which they depended for fishing. DeWitt also negotiated a peace treaty with the Tonkawa, but he was unable to reach terms with the Comanche. As Comanche raids took a toll on the settlement, the political chief in Bexar (northern Texas) sent the settlers of Gonzales a small cannon to use for defense.

In 1830, the Mexican Legislature passed a law prohibiting further immigration to Texas from the United States. Austin was able to secure a waiver for DeWitt's colony, but the measure made recruiting families difficult for him. When his contract expired on April 15, 1831, DeWitt had settled a total of 166 families. Because he had been unable to meet the terms of the contract, unassigned lands in his colony reverted to the Mexican government, and DeWitt was unable to get a further contract.

== Later years and death ==
By 1831, the colony was becoming more successful, but DeWitt's finances were depleted. He had used personal family funds (chiefly his wife's) to help support the colony. In 1835, near the time of the start of hostilities that would result in the Texas Revolution, DeWitt traveled to Monclova, in Mexico, in an unsuccessful attempt to gain more premium land for his colony. While in Monclova, he contracted cholera and died on May 18, 1835. He was buried there. Following his death, during the Battle of Gonzales, his wife Sara and daughter Naomi cut up a dress to make the banner "Come and Take It", which has since become a symbol of pride for the community.

== Legacy ==
Green DeWitt is the namesake of DeWitt County, Texas.
