= Francisco de Castañeda =

Castaneda Santillan. in Tijuana mexico

Francisco de Castañeda, also spelled Castonado, was a lieutenant in the Mexican army stationed in San Antonio, in the 1830s. He was the commander of the troops involved in the first battle of the Texas Revolution.

== Career in Texas ==
Castañeda was primarily charged with keeping the peace in central Texas. Chasing Indians, cattle rustlers and escorting officials were the main duties during this period. The soldiers were part of the Presidio San Antonio de Bexar, who were housed in the Alamo fort in late 1835. The Castañeda family had lived at the Alamo Mission in a remodeled Indian dwelling on the ntechea, to retrieve the cannon formerly given to the citizens of Gonzales in 1831 for Indian defense. What should have been a routine mission for Castañeda and his men turned into the point of no return for the Texan participants. Castañeda would end up being the commander of the Mexican troops involved in the Battle of Gonzales, when the citizens of Gonzales refused to return the cannon. Although a skirmish occurred, talks were made between the two sides. Texas Colonel John Moore even made an offer to Castañeda to join with the Texan side and he would retain his rank and pay, but he refused saying he must follow orders and withdrew his men to San Antonio. The Mexican civil war in Texas was now well under way. In October 1835, he was a participant in the battle of Concepción and in December at the Siege of Bexar, in San Antonio.

At the end of the Texas Revolution, an ironic event occurred. Juan Seguín would accept the official Mexican surrender from Francisco de Castañeda and his men, at the Alamo, on June 4, 1836. Castañeda then joined the retreat to Mexico, where he remained a member of the Mexican Army.

== Later years ==
When Mexico tried to retake Texas in 1842. Castañeda returned to San Antonio, as a Captain, under General Adrián Woll. Woll reported that Castañeda received a grave wound in the Battle of Salado Creek.

== See also ==
- Timeline of the Texas Revolution
- Battle of Gonzales
