= Moore's Fort =

Coordinates: 30.06411°N 96.697812°W

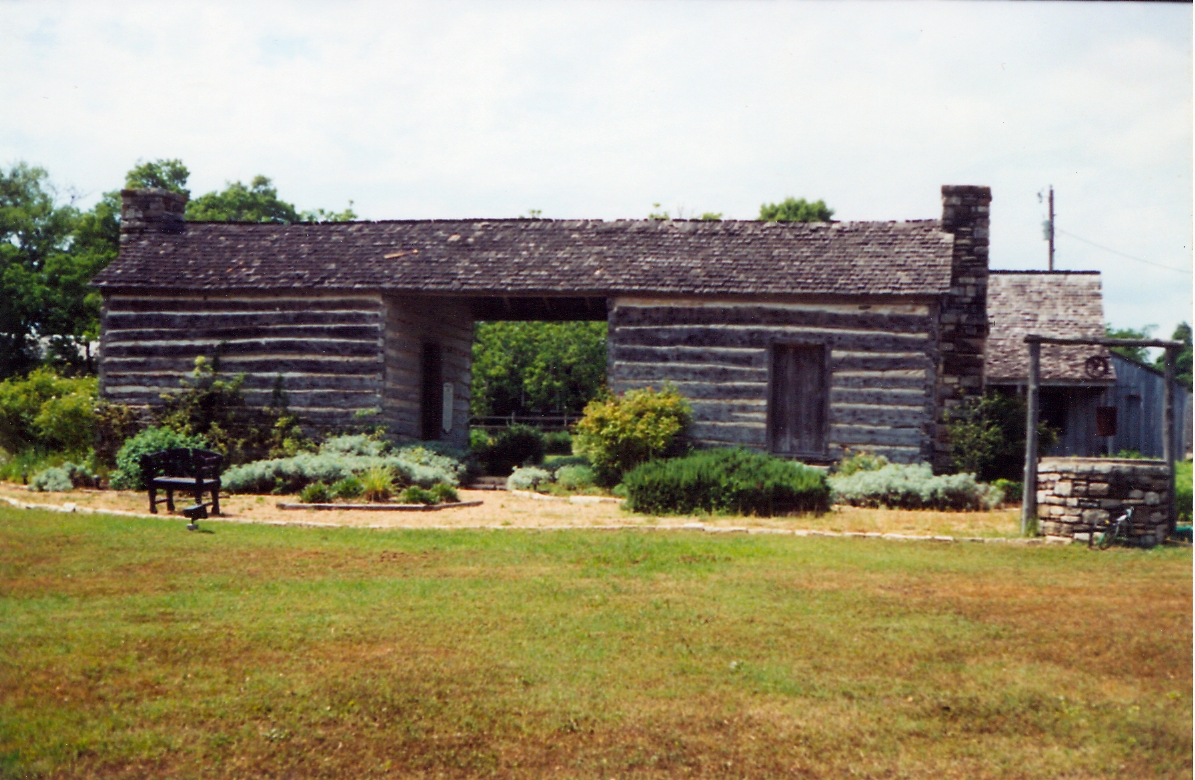
Moore's Fort

Moore's Fort is a twin dogtrot type blockhouse in Round Top, Texas. Built by John Henry Moore in 1828, it is the oldest building in Fayette County. It was originally located where La Grange is today, as a shelter for settlers from Comanche raids. Later it was moved to Round Top. A historical marker sits at the original location in La Grange.
