= John Henry Moore (Texas settler) =

American settler

John Moore
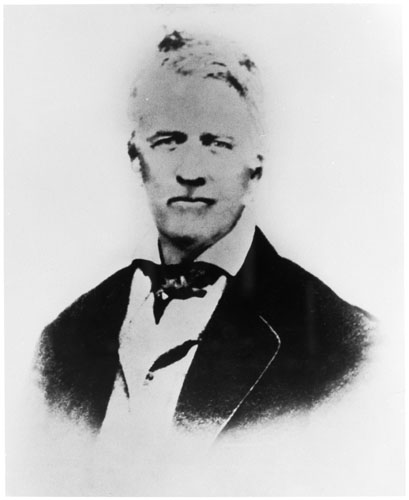
- Born: August 13, 1800; Rome, Tennessee
- Died: December 2, 1880 (aged 80) La Grange, Texas
- Allegiance: Texas
- Rank: Colonel
- Conflicts: Texas Revolution; Battle of Gonzales; Texas–Indian wars; Battle of Salado Creek
- Spouse: Eliza Cummins

John Henry Moore (August 13, 1800 – December 2, 1880) was an American soldier, farmer and early Texian settler. Moore was one of the Old Three Hundred first land grantees to settle in Mexican Texas and fought in Texas Revolution, most notably leading the rebels during the Battle of Gonzales, the first military engagement of the rebellion.

== Early life ==
Moore was born August 13, 1800, in Rome, Smith County, Tennessee. In 1818, Moore ran away from college to the Mexican state of Texas to avoid studying Latin. His father tracked him down and they both returned to Tennessee, but Moore returned to Texas in 1821 as one of the original Anglo-American settlers led by Stephen Austin under the authority of the Mexican government.

== Life in Texas ==
Moore received the title to a parcel of land along the Colorado river in Brazoria County which he developed into a farm. In 1828, he married Eliza Cummins, the daughter of James Cummins, the alcalde of San Felipe. Soon after their marriage, the couple moved to present-day La Grange, Texas, where Moore oversaw the construction of Moore's Fort. He also began his military career by organizing and leading a militia in an expedition against Waco and Tawakoni Indians along the Brazos River. A year later in July 1835, he led four companies of volunteers to attack a Tawakoni encampment in Limestone County.

=== Texas Revolution ===
As early as September 1835, Moore had been an advocate of Texas independence and warned against attacks by the Mexican Army to the point that general Martín Perfecto de Cos had ordered that he be arrested. On September 25, 1835, The Committee of Safety of the town of Gonzales had requested aid from nearby counties in their standoff with Francisco de Castañeda. Castañeda had been ordered by Colonel Domingo Ugartechea, head of all Mexican forces in Texas, to lead a detachment of dragoons in order to retrieve a canon from the town. Moore had travelled to Gonzales with other volunteers and was elected as leader of the militia. After negotiations between Castañeda and the militia of Gonzales broke down, Moore called a war council which voted to initiate a fight. Moore lead the militia across the Guadalupe River to surround the Mexican encampment and on October 2, the militia opened fired. The Mexicans attempted a counter attack, but were forced to withdraw. After the battle, Moore met with Castañeda where he explained that the Texians were rebelling against the rule of Santa Anna and his repudiation of the 1824 Constitution. Castañeda voiced his sympathy with the rebels cause, but also stated his duty as a soldier compelled him to follow orders. Soon after, Castañeda led his troops back to San Antonio after realizing that he was outnumbered and outgunned.

Moore was elected Colonel in the Texian Army and served on the council of war for Texas. He was ordered by Stephen Austin to organize a company of cavalry to be equipped with shotguns and pistols.

=== Post Revolution ===
Moore continued to serve the Texas military after the state had won its independence from Mexico in 1836. In January 1839 he commanded three companies of volunteers in a campaign against Comanches. President Sam Houston had ordered Moore to raise and lead 200 men to defend San Antonio from both Comanche and Mexican attacks and raids. In 1842, Moore lead 200 men in the western frontier from attacks by Indians. While pursuing Indians who had attacked an outpost on Cummins Creek in August 1842, Moore became so ill with rheumatism that it had been reported that he had died from the disease. Later that year, Moore also served under the command of Matthew Caldwell in the Battle of Salado Creek, repelling an invasion by Mexican forces.

During the Civil War, Moore enlisted in Company F, Terry's Texas Rangers. Being 61 years old, he was appointed to a committee to help secure bonds for financing the Confederate cause. During the war, he lost much of his property, including slaves, but he was able to recover somewhat financially. John Moore died on December 2, 1880, and was buried in a family cemetery eight miles north of La Grange.
