= William Stubbs (interior designer) =

- Website: William W. Stubbs & Associates

William W. (Bill) Stubbs, IIDA, is an American interior designer, author, and television show host. He is recognized by Architectural Digest, as one of its AD 100 — which features its top 100 architects and interior designers.

== Biography ==
Born in Gonzales, Texas, Stubbs attended the International Institute of Design in Washington, D.C. After completing his studies in the 1970s, he worked briefly for a Houston department store, and then for real estate developers.

Stubbs established his own firm over 25 years ago — William W. Stubbs and Associates, an international design firm based in Houston, Texas.

In 2004, Stubbs penned an autobiographical book I Hate Red, You’re Fired!.

Bill Stubbs is the host of the Emmy-nominated PBS weekly television show A Moment of Luxury, which aired between April 2008 and December 2009. The show featured locations in the U.S. and around the world.

Stubbs has received recognitions and awards for his interior design work. He is recognized by Architectural Digest as a top 100 designer. He was awarded the American Society of Interior Designers (ASID) Award and the International Interior Design Association (IIDA) Outstanding Design Award. He was awarded the "Stars of Design Lifetime Achievement Award" in May 2013.

== External Articles ==
- von Hoffman, Nicholas (September 2006). "AD100: William W. Stubbs — The Designer Goes From Small-Town Texas to The Big Time In Russia". Architectural Digest.
- Ennis, Michael (August 2003). "AD 100: Ukrainian Jewel Box with William Stubbs — A cottage in Kiev opens to unexpected treasures". Architectural Digest.
- Turrentine, Jeff (December 2005). "AD 100: A Perfect Union with William Stubbs — In Houston, a new couple integrate their collections". Architectural Digest.
- Turrentine, Jeff (July 2007). "AD 100: William W. Stubbs: History Renewed near San Antonio — Antiques and Reclaimed Materials Ground a Texas House Firmly in the Past". Architectural Digest.
