= James Fannin =

American military officer and planter

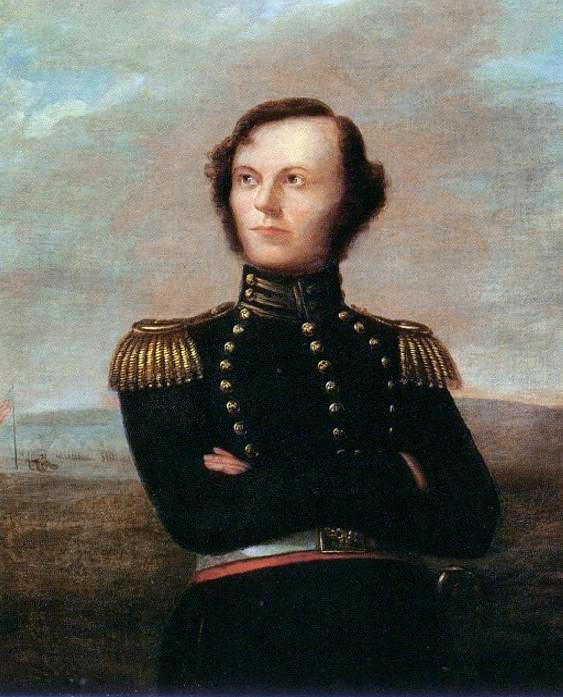
- Portrait of Fannin as a West Point cadet c. 1820
- Born: January 1, 1804; Georgia, U.S.
- Died: March 27, 1836 (aged 32); Fort Defiance, Republic of Texas
- Cause of death: Execution by firing squad
- Military career
- Allegiance: Republic of Texas
- Branch: Texian Army
- Service years: 1834–1836
- Rank: Colonel
- Conflicts: Texas Revolution; Battle of Gonzales; Battle of Goliad; Battle of Concepción; Battle of Coleto (POW)

James Walker Fannin Jr. (January 1, 1804 – March 27, 1836) was an American military officer and planter who served in the Texian Army during the Texas Revolution. After being outnumbered and surrendering to the Mexican Army at the Battle of Coleto Creek, Fannin and his fellow prisoners of war were massacred soon afterward at Goliad, Texas, under Antonio López de Santa Anna's orders. He was memorialized in several place names, including a military training camp and a major city street in Houston.

== Early life and family ==
James Fannin was born on January 1, 1804, in Georgia to Isham Fannin, a plantation owner and veteran of the War of 1812. His mother was not married to his father, and he was adopted by his maternal grandfather, James W. Walker, and raised on a plantation in Marion, Georgia. His ancestors, who spelled the family name Fanning, lived in America during the Revolutionary War, a family with divided loyalties during the conflict. Isham's father James W. Fannin dropped the "g" from the family name and settled in Georgia.

He briefly attended the University of Georgia when he was 14, and later enrolled in the United States Military Academy at West Point on July 1, 1819. He lacked sufficient academic proficiency, and was often tardy or absent from classes, standing 60th out of a class of 86. He resigned November 20, 1821, from the school after dueling a fellow cadet. He had received a letter from a cousin urging his immediate return to Georgia to attend to ailing grandparents.

He married Minerva Fort. Their daughter, Missouri Pinckney, was born on July 17, 1829. A second daughter, Minerva, nicknamed Eliza, was born mentally ill in 1832. While living in Columbus, Georgia, he enlisted in the militia and worked as a merchant. In Muscogee County, he was a member of the Temperance Society, master of the local Masonic lodge, and had attempted to become a judge, but was disqualified for his past of dueling.

== Texas Revolution ==
In 1834, Fannin settled his family at Velasco, in Tejas (now Texas), where he owned a slave plantation and was a managing partner in a slave-trading syndicate. By 1835, Fannin was involved in growing the Anglo-American resistance to the Mexican government of Texas. He wrote letters seeking financial assistance and volunteers to help Texas. By September, Fannin was an active member of the Texian Army.

He took part in the Battle of Gonzales on October 2 and urged Stephen F. Austin to send aid to Gonzales. Fannin later worked with James Bowie, First Battalion, First Division, under Austin's orders to secure supplies and determine the conditions in and around Gonzales and San Antonio de Bexar:

Fellow citizens ... We urge as many as can possibly leave their homes to repair to Gonzales immediately, "armed and equipped for war even to the knife." ...If Texas will now act promptly, she will soon be redeemed from that worse than Egyptian bondage which now cramps her resources and retards her prosperity.

— J.W. Fannin. Jr. (et al), October 2, 1835

Under the command of Bowie, Fannin fought in the Battle of Concepción on October 28, 1835.

In November 1835, Austin ordered Fannin and William B. Travis and about 150 men to cut off any Mexican supply party. On November 13, Houston offered Fannin the post of inspector general to the regular army. Fannin wrote back requesting a field appointment of brigadier general and a "post of danger". On November 22, 1835, Fannin was honorably discharged from the volunteer army by Austin and began campaigning for a larger regular army for Texas. He also went home to spend time with his family.

Sam Houston, supported by Governor Henry Smith, commissioned Fannin as a colonel in the regular army on December 7, 1835. By January 7, 1836, the provisional government had appointed Fannin "military agent", to answer only to the council and not Houston. He began recruiting forces and supplies for the forthcoming and confusing Matamoros campaign against the Mexican city of Matamoros, Tamaulipas. Fannin had difficulty leading the volunteers in his charge. He tried to institute regular Army discipline, but his irregular volunteers would not accept it. Many of his men thought he was aloof, and several historians believe that he was an ineffective commander because of it. The majority of the men serving under Fannin had been in Texas only a short time; he was frustrated by this, writing to Lieutenant Governor James W. Robinson "... among the rise of 400 men at, and near this post, I doubt if 25 citizens of Texas can be mustered in the ranks...".

In early February, Fannin sailed from Velasco and landed at Copano with four companies of the Georgia Battalion, moving to join a small band of Texians at Refugio. Mexican reinforcements under General Jose Urrea arrived at Matamoros, complicating the Texian plans to attack that city. Fannin withdrew 25 miles north to Goliad.

== Failed expedition to support the Alamo and aftermath ==
Appeals from Travis at the Alamo (via James Bonham) prompted Fannin to launch a relief march of more than 300 men and four pieces of artillery on February 25, 1836. After some delay, Fannin and his men moved out on the 28th for the journey to San Antonio, a distance of more than 90 miles. The relief mission was a failure. The troops barely had crossed the San Antonio River when wagons broke down, prompting the men to camp within sight of Goliad. They had little or no food, some men were barefooted, and the oxen teams wandered off during the night. On March 6, 1836, the Battle of the Alamo was fought, with all the Alamo's defenders (about 187 men) being killed by Mexican forces.

The Mexican forces under General José de Urrea were now rapidly approaching the Texan stronghold in Goliad. They defeated Texian forces at the Battle of San Patricio on February 27, where 20 were killed and prisoners were taken. Frank W. Johnson and four other Texians were captured, but later managed to escape and rejoin James Fannin's command at Goliad.

The Battle of Agua Dulce was fought on March 2. Dr. James Grant, Robert C. Morris and 12 others were killed, with prisoners taken. Plácido Benavides and six others escaped to notify Fannin of the situation.

On March 12, Fannin sent Captain Amon B. King and about 28 men to take wagons to Refugio to help evacuate the remaining families. King and his men confronted an advance party of General Urrea's cavalry in the Battle of Refugio; his defense failed and he withdrew to the old mission. A local boy managed to get away and alerted Fannin to the skirmish. Fannin sent Lieutenant Colonel William Ward and about 120 men to King's aid. Ward managed to drive the small Mexican force away and decided to stay the night to rest his men.

On March 14, 1836, Ward and King were attacked by Urrea and more than 200 Mexican soldiers as they were about to leave. This detachment was part of Urrea's larger force of nearly 1,200 men. The same day, General Houston ordered Fannin to retreat to Victoria. Fannin sent word to the men at Refugio to rendezvous with his command at Victoria. Other dispatches were intercepted by the Centralista forces, informing them of Fannin's plans. Fannin needed means of transport and had sent Albert C. Horton and his men to Victoria, to bring carts and 20 yokes of oxen from Army quartermaster John J. Linn, who did return around March 16. Horton's men would later form Fannin's advance guard during the retreat to Victoria. Fannin finally received the news of King and Ward's defeat from Hugh McDonald Frazer on March 17.

== Battle of Coleto Creek ==
On March 19, 1836, Fannin led the Texians on a retreat from Presidio La Bahia, which Fannin had renamed Fort Defiance.

Transporting nine cannons and more than 500 spare muskets, Fannin's forces were also heavily laden with supplies and baggage. The column had traveled about 6 miles when Fannin ordered a halt to rest his animals. At about 3 pm, Mexican cavalry appeared. The Texians immediately formed a hollow square with their wagons and cannon placed in each corner for defense as Urrea's forces attacked. After a fierce battle, the Mexicans lost about 100 to 200 killed and wounded; Texian losses were seven to nine killed and 60 wounded. Facing overwhelming odds, though, Fannin and his troops surrendered the next day, at the Battle of Coleto.

== The Goliad Massacre ==
The Mexicans took the Texians back to Goliad, where they were held as prisoners at Fort Defiance. The Texians thought they would likely be set free in a few weeks. General Urrea left Goliad, leaving command to Colonel Jose Nicolas de la Portilla. Under a decree that Santa Anna had pressed for, and which was passed by the Mexican Congress on December 30, 1835, armed foreigners taken in combat were to be treated as pirates and executed. Urrea wrote to Santa Anna to ask for clemency for the Texians. Urrea wrote in his diary that he "... wished to elude these orders as far as possible without compromising my personal responsibility." On March 26, 1836, 19:00, Santa Anna ordered Portilla to execute the prisoners.

The next day, Palm Sunday, March 27, 1836, Colonel Portilla had 400 Texans marched out of Fort Defiance and shot, clubbed or knifed to death. The 40 wounded men who could not walk were executed inside the fort compound. Fannin was the last to be executed, after seeing his men killed. He was taken to the courtyard in front of the chapel, blindfolded, and seated in a chair (due to his leg wound from the battle). He made three requests: that his personal possessions be sent to his family, to be shot in the heart and not the face, and to be given a Christian burial. He was then shot in the face and his body burned along with the other Texians who died that day.

== Legacy and honors ==
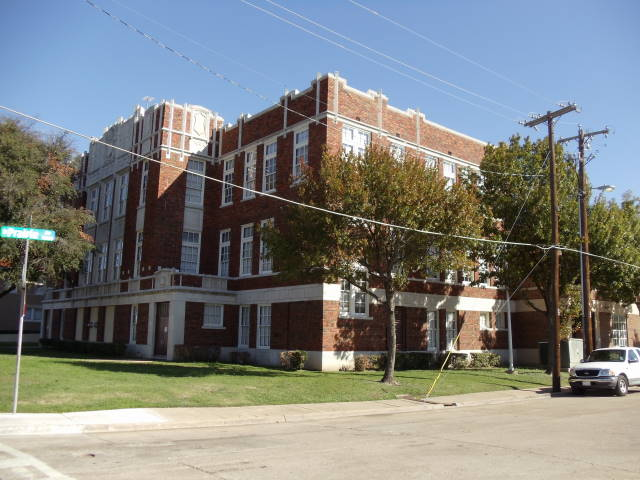
James W. Fannin Elementary School in Dallas

- Fannin Battleground State Historic Site commemorates the Battle of Coleto
- Fannin Memorial Monument, Goliad State Park and Historic Site, by Raoul Josset, 1939
- James W. Fannin Elementary School in Dallas, Texas is on the National Register of Historic Places
- Fannin County, Texas, is named in his honor; the county seat (Bonham) is named for James Bonham, who sought his aid at the Alamo.
- Fannin County, Georgia, is named in his honor.
- Camp Fannin, a large military training camp near Tyler, Texas, was named in his honor. It was used to hold POWs from Europe during World War II.
- A major street in downtown Houston is named after him.
- A major street in downtown Shreveport, Louisiana, is named after him.
- A middle school in Amarillo, Texas, is named for him.
- An elementary school in Midland, Texas, is named for him.
- A street in Denton, Texas is named after him.
- A street in Abilene, Texas is named after him.

== See also ==
- Timeline of the Texas Revolution
