= Battle of Concepción =

1835 Texas Revolution battle

- Part of the Texas Revolution
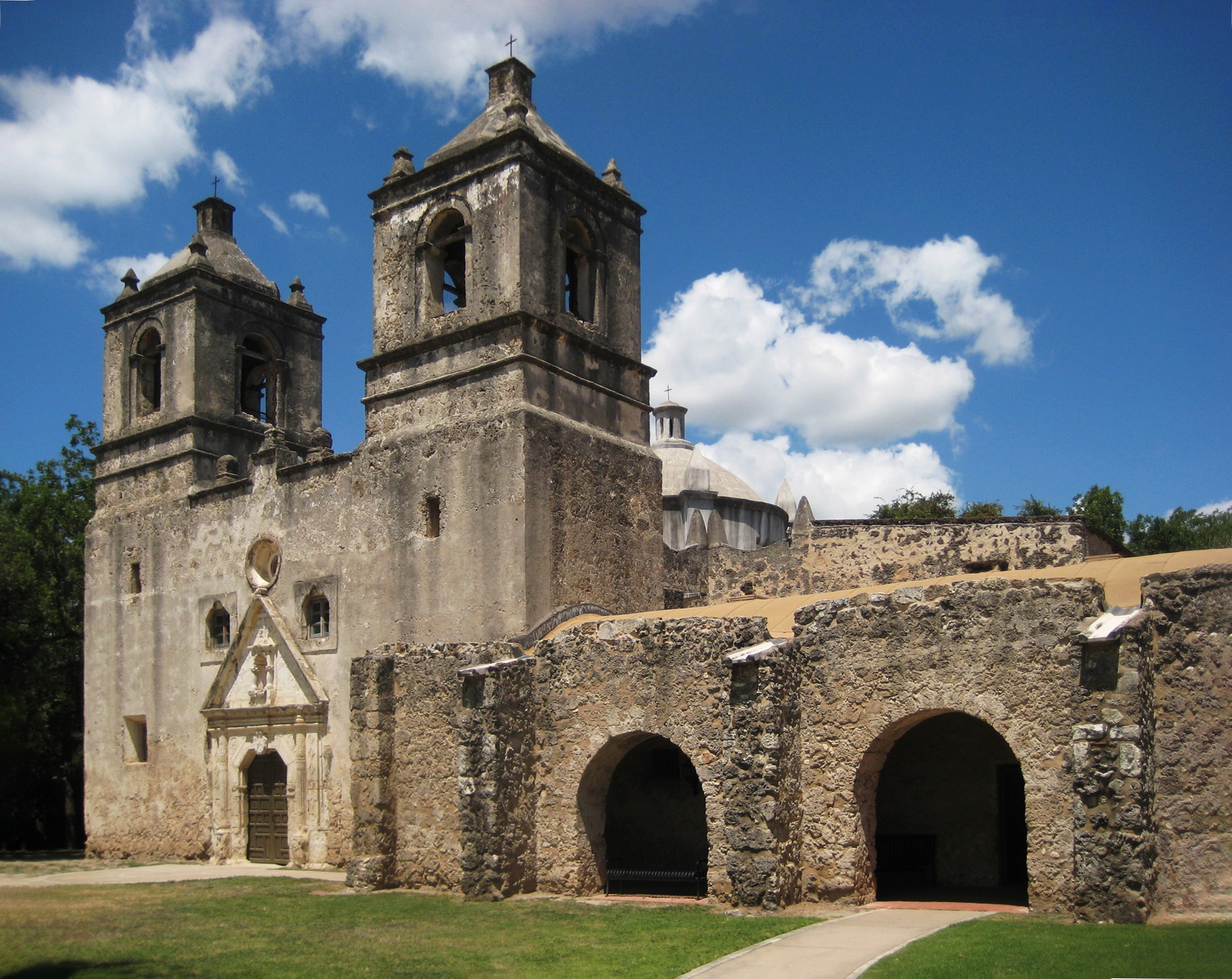
- The battle occurred on the grounds of Mission Concepción
Date	October 28, 1835
Location	Mission Concepción, San Antonio de Béxar 29°23′24″N 98°29′51″W
Result	Texian victory

Belligerents
Texian Rebels	Centralist Republic of Mexico

Commanders and leaders
James Bowie; James Fannin	Domingo Ugartechea

Strength
90 militia	275 infantry & cavalry 2 cannons

Casualties and losses
1 killed 1 wounded	14–76 killed 39 wounded

The battle of Concepción was fought on October 28, 1835, between Mexican troops under Colonel Domingo Ugartechea and Texian patriots led by James Bowie and James Fannin. The 30-minute engagement, which historian J. R. Edmondson describes as "the first major engagement of the Texas Revolution", occurred on the grounds of Mission Concepción, 2 miles (3.2 km) south of now Downtown San Antonio in the U.S. state of Texas.

On October 13, the newly created Texian Army under Stephen F. Austin had marched towards Bexar, where General Martín Perfecto de Cos commanded the remaining Mexican soldiers in Texas. On October 27, Austin sent Bowie and Fannin, with 90 soldiers, to find a defensible spot near Bexar for the Texian Army to rest. After choosing a site near Mission Concepción, the scouting party camped for the night and sent a courier to notify Austin. After learning that the Texian Army was divided, Cos sent Ugartechea with 275 soldiers to attack the Texians camped at Concepción. The Texians took cover in a horseshoe-shaped gully; their good defensive position helped them to repel several Mexican attacks, and the Mexican soldiers retreated just 30 minutes before the remainder of the Texian Army arrived. Historians estimate that between 14 and 76 Mexican soldiers were killed, while only one Texian soldier died.

== Background ==
The newly organized Texian Army, determined to put a decisive end to Mexican control over Texas, began marching towards San Antonio de Bexar on October 13, 1835. Days earlier, General Martín Perfecto de Cos, brother-in-law of the Mexican president, had arrived in Bexar to take command of all the Mexican forces in Texas. By October 20 the Texians—led by Stephen F. Austin, the first empresario to bring English-speaking settlers to Texas (Note: Mexican Texas included the land north of the Medina and the Nueces Rivers, 100 miles (161 km) northeast of the Rio Grande, west of San Antonio de Béxar, and east of the Sabine River. According to Manchaca's Recovering History, Constructing Race: The Indian, Black, and White Roots of Mexican Americans, by 1834 an estimated 30,000 English-speakers lived in Texas, compared with only 7,800 of Spanish heritage.)—had reached Salado Creek and initiated a siege of Béxar. To keep the Texians from examining Mexican defensive measures, Mexican troops attempted to restrict access to and from the city. Despite those efforts, several people were able to leave their homes and join the Texians. Among those was James Bowie, who was well known for his fighting prowess; stories of his exploits in the Sandbar Fight and his search for the lost San Saba mine had been widely reported.

On October 22, Austin named Bowie a colonel and gave him joint command of the 1st Battalion with Captain James W. Fannin. Before nightfall the 1st Battalion began a reconnaissance mission to evaluate the former missions around San Antonio as potential campsites. Locals familiar with the area, Juan Seguín and his Texians, would guide the men along the river. After investigating three of the missions, Bowie and Fannin selected Mission San Francisco de la Espada as the most promising campsite. The rest of the Texian Army joined them there early on October 27. Eager to move closer to Bexar, Austin immediately sent Bowie and Fannin to find a good defensive spot for the army to rest that night.

== Prelude ==
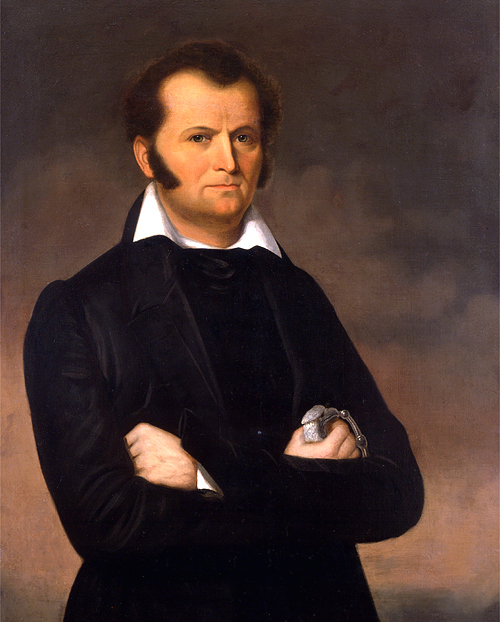
Colonel James Bowie led the Texian forces during the battle of Concepción.

Bowie and Fannin were accompanied by ninety soldiers, divided into four companies led by Captains Andrew Briscoe, Robert Coleman, Michael Goheen, and Valentine Bennet. The group took a northerly route, following the San Antonio River past Missions San Juan and San José. Along the way they encountered a small party of Mexican scouts, who retreated to Bexar after a brief skirmish.

Approximately 2 miles (3.2 km) from San Antonio de Bexar and 6 miles (9.7 km) from the Texian camp at Espada, the Texian scouting party stopped at Mission Concepción. Five hundred yards (460 m) west of the mission, the San Antonio River curved in a small horseshoe shape, with the two sides of the river's curve approximately 100 yards (91 m) apart. According to historian Alwyn Barr, "trees shaded both sides of the broad river bottom which lay about six feet below the level of the rolling praire [sic?] nearby". Rather than return immediately to Austin, as their orders specified, Bowie and Fannin instead sent a courier to bring Austin directions to Concepción. The next day, an angry Austin issued a statement threatening officers who chose not to follow orders with court-martial.

The Texian scouting party divided into two camps. Fannin supervised 49 men at the south part of the horseshoe bend, while Bowie and the remaining men camped at the northern part of the bend. Any Mexican force coming from the north would be caught in their crossfire. Pickets were stationed around the area and in the mission tower, which offered greater visibility. As they settled down for the evening, the Texians were surprised to see a Mexican cannonball, fired from one of the church towers in Bexar, hit just beyond their camp. Many of the Texian soldiers believed that a priest from the mission had informed the Mexican Army of their position.

== Battle ==
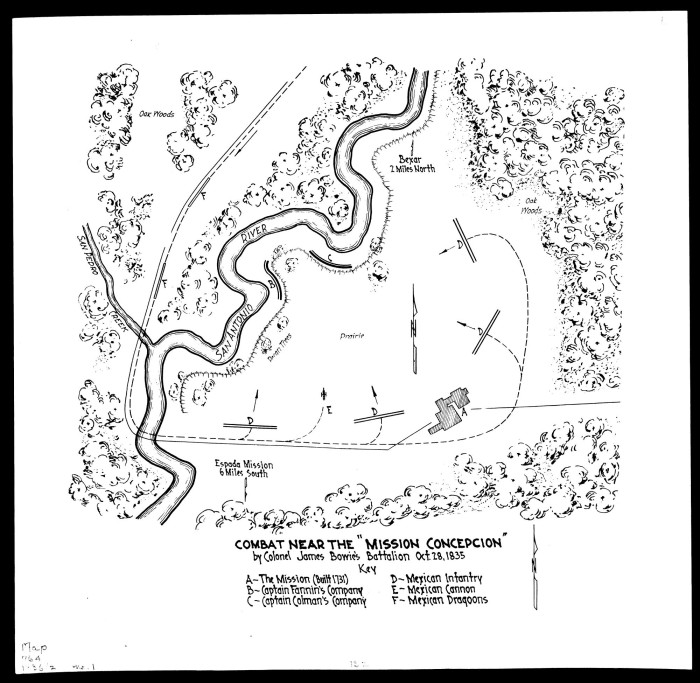
Map of the battle site

Hoping to neutralize the Texian force at Concepción before the remainder of the Texian Army arrived, Cos ordered Colonel Domingo Ugartechea to lead an early-morning assault on October 28. At 6:00 a.m., Ugartechea left Bexar with 275 Mexican soldiers and 2 cannons. Heavy fog delayed their approach, and the Mexican soldiers did not reach Concepción until 14:00 or 8:00 a.m. A Mexican cavalry scout fired at Texian picket Henry Karnes; after returning fire, Karnes ran back to his company, frustrated because, as he put it, "Boys, the scoundrels have shot off my powder horn". The Texians took refuge in the gully, firing from its edge before dropping 6 feet (1.8 m) down to the river level to reload. As the remaining Texian sentries hurried to join the main body of Texian soldiers, Pen Jarvis was struck by a Mexican bullet and fell down the riverbank. The bullet hit a knife Jarvis had slipped through the front of his belt, and he suffered only bruises.

The Texian position was surrounded by trees, leaving the Mexican cavalry no room to maneuver. The 200 members of the cavalry remained on the west bank of the river, behind the Texians, to foil any escape attempts. Lieutenant Colonel José Maria Mendosa brought the Mexican infantry and artillery across the river to a position below that of the Texians. In response, Texians trimmed the undergrowth near their camp to provide better visibility and dug steps into the embankment, allowing them to more easily climb up to the fire. The two sides skirmished desultorily for two hours, until the fog began to lift. At that point, 50–60 Mexican infantrymen crossed the prairie to surround the Texians. Seeing their approach, Bowie shouted to his Texian forces, "Keep under cover, boys, and reserve your fire; we haven't a man to spare!" At 300 yards (270 m) from the Texian position, the Mexican infantry halted and formed a line with the cannon in the middle. They began firing as they advanced toward the Texian positions, to little effect. For the most part, the Mexican volleys passed over the heads of the Texians. According to Texian Noah Smithwick, "grapeshot and canister thrashed through the pecan trees overhead, raining a shower of ripe nuts down on us, and I saw men picking them up and eating them with as little concern as if they were being shaken down by a norther." In his official report to Austin, Bowie remarked that "The discharge from the enemy was one continued blaze of fire, whilst that from our lines, was more slowly delivered, but with good aim and deadly effect."

When Mexican officers ordered a charge on the south bend held by Fannin, Bowie sent Coleman's company to help. Most of the Texian reinforcements maneuvered to their new position from below the river bank, but several rose from cover and dashed across the prairie. One of them, Richard Andrews, was hit in the side with grapeshot and died several hours after the battle.

As the reinforcements reached the southern part of the horseshoe, the Mexican infantry fell back, leaving the cannon within 100 yards (91 m) of the Texians. Texians redirected their fire to the cannoneers. After three different sets of gunners were killed or wounded, the cannons were abandoned. The Mexican infantry attempted three attacks; all were repulsed. As the Mexican buglers called for a retreat, the infantry fell back beyond Texian rifle range. The Mexican cavalry was sent to retrieve wounded men and the cannon. As the cavalry approached, Bowie led a charge onto the prairie. The Texians quickly captured the cannon and turned it on the fleeing Mexican soldiers. Grapeshot killed one of the mule drivers, causing his caisson to go out of control and "careen[...] through the shattered Mexican ranks". The battle had lasted only 30 minutes.

== Aftermath ==
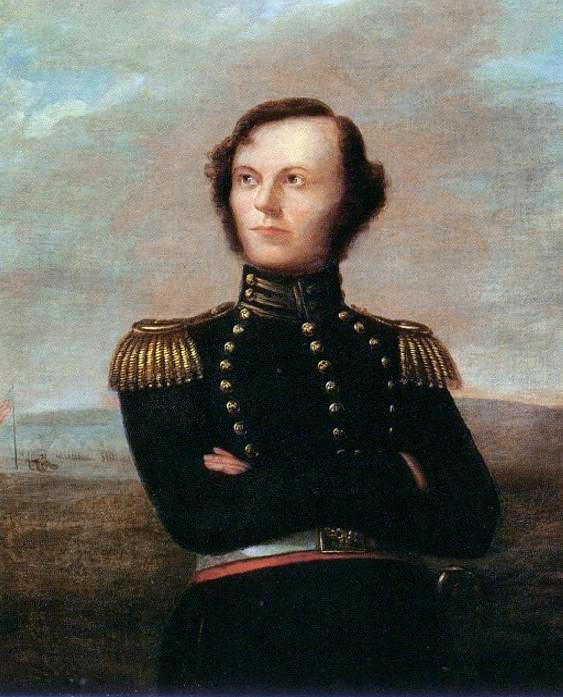
Captain James W. Fannin was one of the commanders at the battle of Concepción.

Austin had intended to reunite the two parts of his army early on October 28, but the group camping at Mission Espada had delayed their departure to unsuccessfully pursue a company that had deserted. Lieutenant Colonel William Barret Travis and his company of cavalry rode ahead of the main body of the army. When they reached Concepción, the Mexican Army was still visible in the distance. The small band of Texian cavalry pursued but the Mexican soldiers reached Bexar safely.

Less than 30 minutes after the battle ended, the rest of the Texian Army arrived. Austin felt that the Mexican morale must be low after their defeat and wanted to proceed immediately to Bexar. Bowie and other officers refused, as they believed Bexar was too heavily fortified. The Texians searched the area for any Mexican equipment which had been abandoned during the retreat. They found several boxes of cartridges. Complaining that the Mexican powder was "little better than pounded charcoal", the Texians emptied the cartridges but kept the bullets.

That evening, Austin allowed a local priest and men from Bexar to retrieve the bodies of the Mexican soldiers who had died in battle. Barr estimated that at least 14 Mexican soldiers were killed, with an additional 39 wounded, several of whom died later. Timothy Todish et al., in their book The Alamo Sourcebook, estimated that 60 Mexican soldiers were killed, while historian Stephen Hardin claimed that 76 Mexican soldiers died. The only Texian to die in battle was Andrews, (Note: Andrews County, Texas is named for Richard Andrews.) and Jarvis was the only Texian classified as wounded.

This battle, which historian J. R. Edmondson describes as "the first major engagement of the Texas Revolution", was the last offensive against the Texians that Cos would order. Barr attributed the Texian victory to "able leadership, a strong position, and greater firepower". The Mexican cavalry was unable to fight effectively in the wooded, riverbottom terrain, and the weapons of the Mexican infantry had a much lower range than that of the Texians. Although Barr continues that the battle "should have taught ... lessons on Mexican courage and the value of a good defensive position", Hardin believes that "the relative ease of the victory at Concepción instilled in the Texians a reliance on their long rifles and a contempt for their enemies". A soldier who later served under Fannin complained that Fannin's "former experience in fighting Mexicans [at Concepción] had led him to neglect to take such precautionary measures as were requisite", which may have contributed to his defeat at the Battle of Coleto in March 1836.

In 2023, historical researchers used a computer program that found that the battle site may have occurred about 2,000 feet north of Concepción park, where the marker of where the battle took place is located. Musket balls and other artifacts have been found in the area but a specific site of the conflict is not yet archaeologically certain.

== See also ==
- List of Texas Revolution battles
- Timeline of the Texas Revolution

== Bibliography ==
- Barr, Alwyn (1990). Texans in Revolt: The Battle for San Antonio, 1835. Austin, Texas: University of Texas Press. ISBN 0-292-77042-1. OCLC 20354408.
- Edmondson, J.R. (2000). The Alamo Story: From History to Current Conflicts. Plano, Texas: Republic of Texas Press. ISBN 1-55622-678-0. OCLC 42842410.
- Groneman, Bill (1998). Battlefields of Texas. Plano, Texas: Republic of Texas Press. ISBN 978-1-55622-571-0. OCLC 37935129.
- Hardin, Stephen L. (1994). Texian Iliad: A Military History of the Texas Revolution. Austin, Texas: University of Texas Press. ISBN 0-292-73086-1. OCLC 29704011.
- Menchaca, Martha (2001). Recovering History, Constructing Race: The Indian, Black, and White Roots of Mexican Americans. The Joe R. and Teresa Lozano Long Series in Latin American and Latino Art and Culture. Austin, Tex: University of Texas Pressas. ISBN 0-292-75253-9. OCLC 46872371.
- Todish, Timothy J.; Todish, Terry; Spring, Ted (1998). Alamo Sourcebook, 1836: A Comprehensive Guide to the Battle of the Alamo and the Texas Revolution. Austin, TX: Eakin Press. ISBN 978-1-57168-152-2. OCLC 36783795.
