= Battle of Gonzales =

1835 battle of the Texas Revolution

- Part of the Texas Revolution
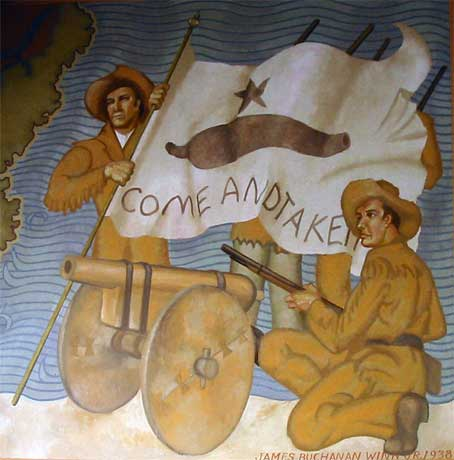
- Mural showing a conjectured Come and Take It flag as flown by Texians before the battle
Date	October 2, 1835
Location	Gonzales, Texas 29°26′20″N 97°31′18″W
Result	Texian victory

Belligerents
Mexico	Texian Militia; Texian Army

Commanders and leaders
Francisco de Castañeda	John Henry Moore

Strength
100	150

Casualties and losses
2 killed 1 wounded	None

The Battle of Gonzales was the first military engagement of the Texas Revolution. It was fought near Gonzales, Texas, on October 2, 1835, between rebellious Texian settlers and a detachment of Mexican Army soldiers. In 1831, Green DeWitt asked the Mexican authorities to lend the Gonzales colonists a cannon to help protect them from frequent Comanche raids. One was supplied, on the condition that the cannon would be returned to the Mexicans on request. Over the next four years, the political situation in Mexico deteriorated, and in 1835 several states revolted. As the unrest spread, Colonel Domingo de Ugartechea, the commander of all Mexican troops in Texas, felt it unwise to leave the residents of Gonzales with a weapon and requested the return of the cannon.

When the initial request was refused, Ugartechea sent 100 dragoons to retrieve the cannon. The soldiers neared Gonzales on September 29, but the colonists used a variety of excuses to keep them from the town, while secretly sending messengers to request assistance from nearby communities. Within two days, up to 140 Texians gathered in Gonzales, all determined not to give up the cannon. On October 1, settlers voted to initiate a fight. Mexican soldiers opened fire as Texians approached their camp in the early hours of October 2. After several hours of desultory firing, the Mexican soldiers withdrew. Although the skirmish had little military significance, it marked a clear break between the colonists and the Mexican government and is considered to have been the start of the Texas Revolution. News of the skirmish spread throughout the United States, where it was often referred to as the "Lexington of Texas".

Two cannons were used by the Texians in the fighting, the bronze six-pounder under dispute and a smaller Spanish esmeril made of iron, its caliber being a one pounder or less. The cannon's fate is disputed. It may have been buried and rediscovered in 1936, or it may have been seized by Mexican troops after the Battle of the Alamo. A bronze six-pounder was noted as one of twenty-one large guns captured and buried by the Mexicans at the Alamo, dug up in 1852 and sent to New York in 1874 to be cast into a bell that hangs in St. Mark's Episcopal Church in San Antonio; while a smaller iron gun was abandoned in a creek and uncovered by a flood in 1936, on show in the Gonzales Memorial Museum as of 2020.

== Background ==
Highlighted on this map of modern-day Texas is the area that was part of the DeWitt Colony.

The Mexican Constitution of 1824 liberalized the country's immigration policies, allowing foreign immigrants to settle in border regions such as Mexican Texas, and to bring their slaves with them. In 1825, American Green DeWitt received permission to settle 400 families in Texas near the confluence of the San Marcos and Guadalupe Rivers. The DeWitt Colony quickly became a favorite raiding target of local Karankawa, Tonkawa, and Comanche tribes, and in July 1826 they destroyed the capital city, Gonzales. The town was rebuilt the following year, after DeWitt negotiated peace treaties with the Karankawa and Tonkawa. The Comanche continued to stage periodic raids of the settlement over the next few years. Unable to spare military troops to protect the town, in 1831 the region's political chief instead sent the settlers of Gonzales a six-pounder cannon, Historian Thomas Ricks Lindley states that Green DeWitt wrote to the Mexican authorities asking for a cannon, and they responded with the loan of a Spanish six-pounder bronze cannon on the condition it be returned when asked for; Lindley states that the Texians also had a much smaller iron cannon of one pounder calibre or less. Writer Timothy Todish described the six pounder as "a small bored gun, good for little more than starting horse races", despite it being a gun of around 2.2 in (57 mm) calibre firing 6 lb (2.7 kg) projectiles.

In 1829, Mexico ended slavery and freed the slaves throughout Mexico, but negotiated an exception for the American immigrants in Tejas. In April 1830, Mexico closed its borders to new immigrants who had not already been authorized to join an existing colony. During the 1830s, the Mexican government wavered between federalist and centralist policies. As the pendulum swung sharply towards centralism in 1835, several Mexican states revolted. In June, a small group of settlers in Texas used the political unrest as an excuse to rebel against customs duties, in an incident known as the Anahuac Disturbances. The federal government responded by sending more troops to Texas.

Public opinion was sharply divided. Some communities supported the rebellion for a variety of reasons. The new policies, the bans of slavery and immigration chief among them, and the increased enforcement of laws and import tariffs, incited many immigrants to revolt. The border region of Mexican Texas was largely populated by immigrants from the United States, some legal but most illegal. Some of these immigrants brought large numbers of slaves with them, so that by 1836, there were about 5,000 enslaved persons in a total non-native population estimated at 38,470. Others, including Gonzales, declared their loyalty to Mexican President Antonio López de Santa Anna's centralist government. Local leaders began calling for a Consultation to determine whether a majority of settlers favored independence, a return to federalism, or the status quo. Although some leaders worried that Mexican officials would see this type of gathering as a step toward revolution, by the end of August most communities had agreed to send delegates to the Consultation, scheduled for October 15. In the interim, many communities formed Texian Militia companies to protect themselves from a potential attack by military forces.

On September 10, a Mexican soldier bludgeoned a Gonzales resident, which led to widespread outrage and public protests. Mexican authorities felt it unwise to leave the settlers with a weapon. Colonel Domingo de Ugartechea, commander of all Mexican troops in Texas, sent a corporal and five enlisted men to retrieve the cannon that had been loaned to the colonists. Many of the settlers believed Mexican authorities were manufacturing an excuse to attack the town and eliminate the militia. In a town meeting, three citizens voted to hand over the gun to forestall an attack; the remainder, including alcalde Andrew Ponton, voted to stand their ground. According to historian Stephen Hardin, "the cannon became a point of honor and an unlikely rallying symbol. Gonzales citizens had no intention of handing over the weapon at a time of growing tension." The soldiers were escorted from town without the cannon.

=== Old Eighteen ===
"Old Eighteen" refers to the 18 Texians who delayed Mexican attempts to reclaim the Gonzales cannon until Texian Militia arrived, which instigated the ensuing battle. The phrase is a pastiche of "Old Three Hundred". They are:

1. William W. Arrington
2. Simeon Bateman
3. Valentine Bennet
4. Joseph D. Clements
5. Almon Cottle
6. Jacob C. Darst
7. George W. Davis
8. Almaron Dickinson
9. Graves Fulchear
10. Benjamin Fuqua
11. James Hinds
12. Thomas Jackson
13. Albert Martin
14. Charles Mason
15. Thomas R. Miller
16. John Sowell
17. Winslow Turner
18. Ezekiel Williams

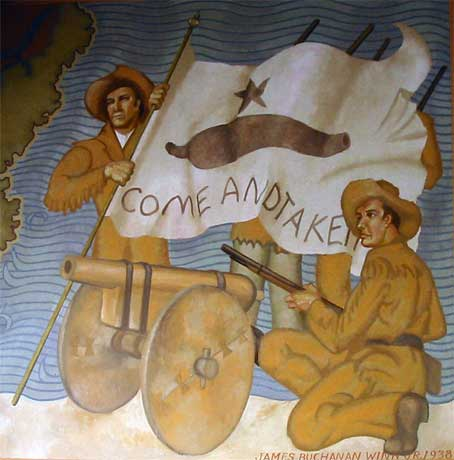
Museum mural of Texian soldiers fighting in the Battle of Gonzales, which was referred to as the "Lexington of Texas" because it was the first battle of the Texas Revolution

== Prelude ==
Ponton anticipated that Ugartechea would send more troops to force the return of the lent cannon. As soon as the first group of soldiers left Gonzales, Ponton sent a messenger to the closest town, Mina, to request help. Word quickly spread that up to 300 soldiers were expected to march on Gonzales. Stephen F. Austin, one of the most respected men in Texas and the de facto leader of the settlers, sent messengers to inform surrounding communities of the situation. Austin cautioned Texians to remain on the defensive, as any unprovoked attacks against Mexican forces could limit the support Texians might receive from the United States if war officially began.

On September 27, 1835, a detachment of 100 dragoons of the Segunda Compañía Volante de San Carlos de Álamo de Parras, led by Lieutenant Francisco de Castañeda, left San Antonio de Béxar, carrying an official order for Ponton to return the cannon. Castañeda had been instructed to avoid using force if possible. When the troops neared Gonzales on September 29, they found that the settlers had removed the ferry and all other boats from the Guadalupe River. On the other side of the swiftly moving river waited 18 Texians. Albert Martin, captain of the Gonzales Texian Militia company, informed the soldiers that Ponton was out of town, and until his return, the army must remain on the west side of the river.

With no easy way to cross the river, Castañeda and his men made camp at the highest ground in the area, about 300 yards (270 m) from the river. Three Texians hurried to bury the cannon, while others traveled to nearby communities to ask for assistance. By the end of the day, more than 80 men had arrived from Fayette and Columbus. Texian Militia companies generally elected their own leaders, and the men now gathered in Gonzales invoked their right to choose their own captain rather than report to Martin. John Henry Moore of Fayette was elected leader, with Joseph Washington Elliot Wallace and Edward Burleson, both of Columbus, respectively elected second and third in command.

On September 30, Castañeda reiterated his request for the cannon and was again rebuffed. Texians insisted on discussing the matter directly with Ugartechea. According to their spokesman, until this was possible, "the only answer I can therefore give you is that I cannot now [and] will not deliver to you the cannon". Castañeda reported to Ugartechea that the Texians were stalling, likely to give reinforcements time to gather.

In San Antonio de Béxar, Ugartechea asked Dr. Launcelot Smither, a Gonzales resident in town on personal business, to help Castañeda convince the settlers to follow orders. When Smither arrived on October 1, he met with militia Captain Mathew Caldwell to explain that the soldiers meant no harm if the settlers would peacefully return the cannon. Caldwell instructed Smither to bring Castañeda to the town the following morning to discuss the matter. At roughly the same time, Moore called a war council, which quickly voted to initiate a fight. Whether the war council was aware that Caldwell had promised Castañeda safe passage to Gonzales the next morning is unclear.

Texians dug up the cannon and mounted it on cart wheels. In the absence of cannonballs, they gathered metal scraps to fill the cannon. James C. Neill, who had served in an artillery company during the War of 1812, was given command of the cannon. He gathered several men, including Almaron Dickinson, also a former US Army field artilleryman, together to form the first artillery company of Texians. A local Methodist minister, W. P. Smith, blessed their activities in a sermon, which made frequent reference to the American Revolution.

As the Texians made plans for an attack, Castañeda learned from a Coushatta Indian that about 140 men were gathered in Gonzales, with more expected. The Mexican soldiers began searching for a safe place to cross the river. At nightfall on October 1, they stopped to make camp, 7 miles (11 km) upriver from their previous spot.

== Battle ==
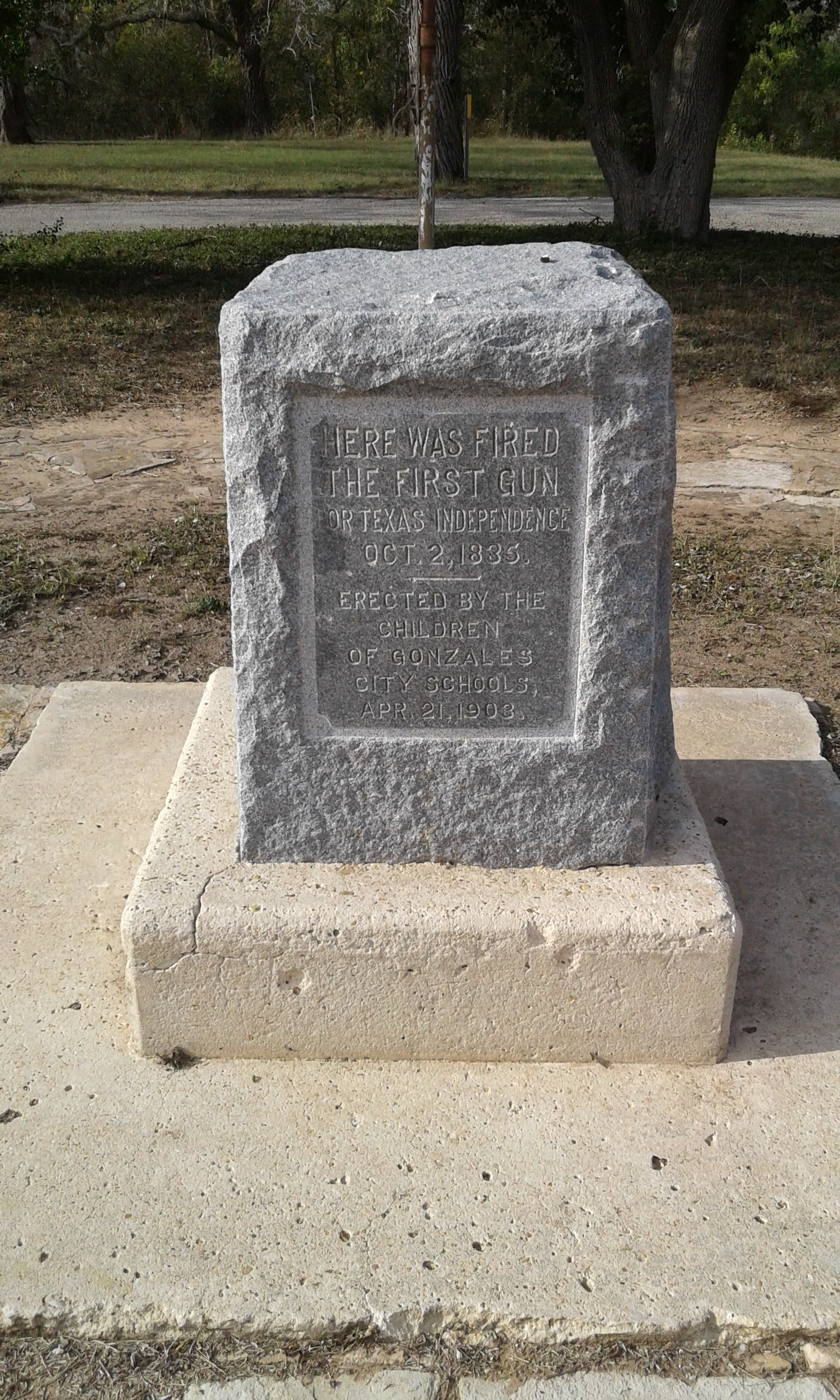
Memorial to the battle at the battlefield's site

Texians began crossing the river around 7:00 pm. Less than half of the men were mounted, slowing their progress as they tracked the Mexican soldiers. A thick fog rolled in around midnight, further delaying them. Around 3:00 am, Texians reached the new Mexican camp. A dog barked at their approach, alerting the Mexican soldiers, who began to fire. The noise caused one of the Texian horses to panic and throw his rider, who suffered a bloody nose. Moore and his men hid in the thick trees until dawn. As they waited, some of the Texians raided a nearby field and snacked on watermelon.

With the darkness and fog, Mexican soldiers could not estimate how many men had surrounded them. They withdrew 300 yards (270 m) to a nearby bluff. Around 6:00 am, Texians emerged from the trees and began firing at the Mexican soldiers. Lieutenant Gregorio Pérez counterattacked with 40 mounted soldiers. The Texians fell back to the trees and fired a volley, injuring a Mexican private. According to some accounts, the cannon fell out of the wagon upon the shot. Unable to safely maneuver among the trees, the Mexican horsemen returned to the bluff.

As the fog lifted, Castañeda sent Smither to request a meeting between the two commanders. Smither was promptly arrested by the Texians, who were suspicious of his presence among the Mexican soldiers. Nevertheless, Moore agreed to meet Castañeda. Moore explained that his followers no longer recognized the centralist government of Santa Anna and instead remained faithful to the constitution of 1824, which Santa Anna had repudiated. Castañeda revealed that he shared their federalist leanings, but that he was honor-bound to follow orders.

As Moore returned to camp, the Texians raised a homemade white banner with an image of the cannon painted in black in the center, over the words "Come and Take It". The makeshift flag, lost later the same year, evoked the American Revolutionary-era slogan "Don't Tread on Me". Texians then fired their cannon at the Mexican camp. Realizing that he was outnumbered and outgunned, Castañeda led his troops back to San Antonio de Béxar. The troops were gone before the Texians finished reloading. In his report to Ugartechea, Castañeda wrote, "since the orders from your Lordship were for me to withdraw without compromising the honor of Mexican arms, I did so".

== Aftermath ==
One spirit and one purpose animates the people of this party of the country, and that is to take Bexar, and drive the military out of Texas. ... A combined effort of all Texas would soon free our soil of Military despots—we should then have peace, for the present Government of Mexico have too much to do at home ... to send another army to Texas.

— Stephen F. Austin

Two Mexican soldiers were killed in the attack. The only Texian casualty was the bloody nose suffered by the man bucked off his horse. Although the event was, as characterized by Davis, "an inconsequential skirmish in which one side did not try to fight", Texians soon declared it a victory over Mexican troops. Despite its minimal military impact, Hardin asserts that the skirmish's "political significance was immeasurable". A large number of Texians had taken an armed stand against the Mexican army, and they had no intention of returning to their neutral stance towards Santa Anna's government. Two days after the battle, Austin wrote to the San Felipe de Austin Committee of Public Safety, "War is declared—public opinion has proclaimed it against a Military despotism—The campaign has commenced". News of the skirmish, originally called "the fight at Williams' place", spread throughout the United States, encouraging many adventurers to come to Texas and assist in the fight against Mexico. Newspapers referred to the conflict as the "Lexington of Texas"; as the Battles of Lexington and Concord began the American Revolution, the Gonzales skirmish launched the Texas Revolution.

Before fighting had officially erupted, Santa Anna had realized that stronger measures were needed to ensure calm in Texas. He ordered his brother-in-law, General Martín Perfecto de Cos to bring approximately 500 soldiers to Texas. Cos and his men arrived in Goliad on October 2. Three days later, after learning of the events at Gonzales, the soldiers left for San Antonio de Béxar.

Gonzales became a rallying point for Texians opposed to Santa Anna's policies. On October 11, they unanimously elected Austin their commander, despite his lack of military training. The following day, Austin led the men on a march towards San Antonio de Béxar to lay siege to Cos's troops. By the end of the year, the Texians had driven all Mexican troops from Texas.

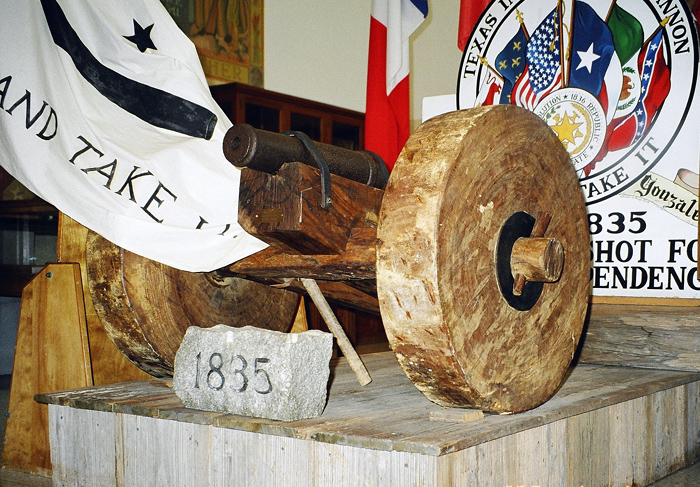
This cannon, displayed at the Gonzales Memorial Museum, may have participated in the battle.

The cannon's fate is disputed. According to the memoirs (written in the 1890s) of Gonzales blacksmith Noah Smithwick, the cannon was abandoned after the cart's axles began to smoke during a march to San Antonio de Béxar to assist in Austin's siege. Smithwick reported that the cannon was buried near a creek not far from Gonzales. A small iron cannon was exposed during a June 1936 flood near Gonzales. In 1979, this cannon was purchased by Dr. Patrick Wagner, who believed it matched Smithwick's descriptions of the cannon used in the battle. The Curator of Military History at the Smithsonian Institution verified that Wagner's cannon was a type of small swivel gun used in America through 1836. The Conservation Laboratory at the University of Texas confirmed that Wagner's cannon had been buried in moist ground for an extended time period.

Writing in the Handbook of Texas, historian Thomas Ricks Lindley maintains that the Wagner cannon does not match the Smithwick account. The Wagner gun is made of iron and is smaller than a six-pounder. Lindley states that Francisco de Castañeda reported two cannons being used by the Texians in the battle, the large bronze cannon lent by the Mexicans and a much smaller iron cannon, two other Mexican accounts also recording both cannons in Gonzales.

Historians such as Lindley think it likely that the bronze six-pounder cannon which caused the dispute was taken to San Antonio de Béxar, where it was used during the Battle of the Alamo and captured by Mexican troops in March 1836. Lindley states that the bronze cannon was dug up in 1852 and in 1874 its metal was recast into a bell which hangs in St. Mark's Episcopal Church in San Antonio; while the Texian's small iron cannon was abandoned at Sandies Creek, uncovered by a flood in 1936, and as of 2020 is displayed in the Gonzales Memorial Museum as the Come and Take It cannon.

The battle is re-enacted during the Come and Take It celebration in Gonzales every October. In and around Gonzales are nine Texas historical markers which commemorate various locations used in the prelude to the battle.

== See also ==
- List of conflicts involving the Texas Military
- List of Texas Revolution battles
- Texian Militia – 1823–1835 militia of American colonists in Mexican Texas
- Timeline of the Texas Revolution
- Twin Sisters – Cannons used in the Texas Revolution
- Bibliography of the Texas Revolution, Republic, and Annexation
