= Gonzales, Texas =

City in Texas, US

- City
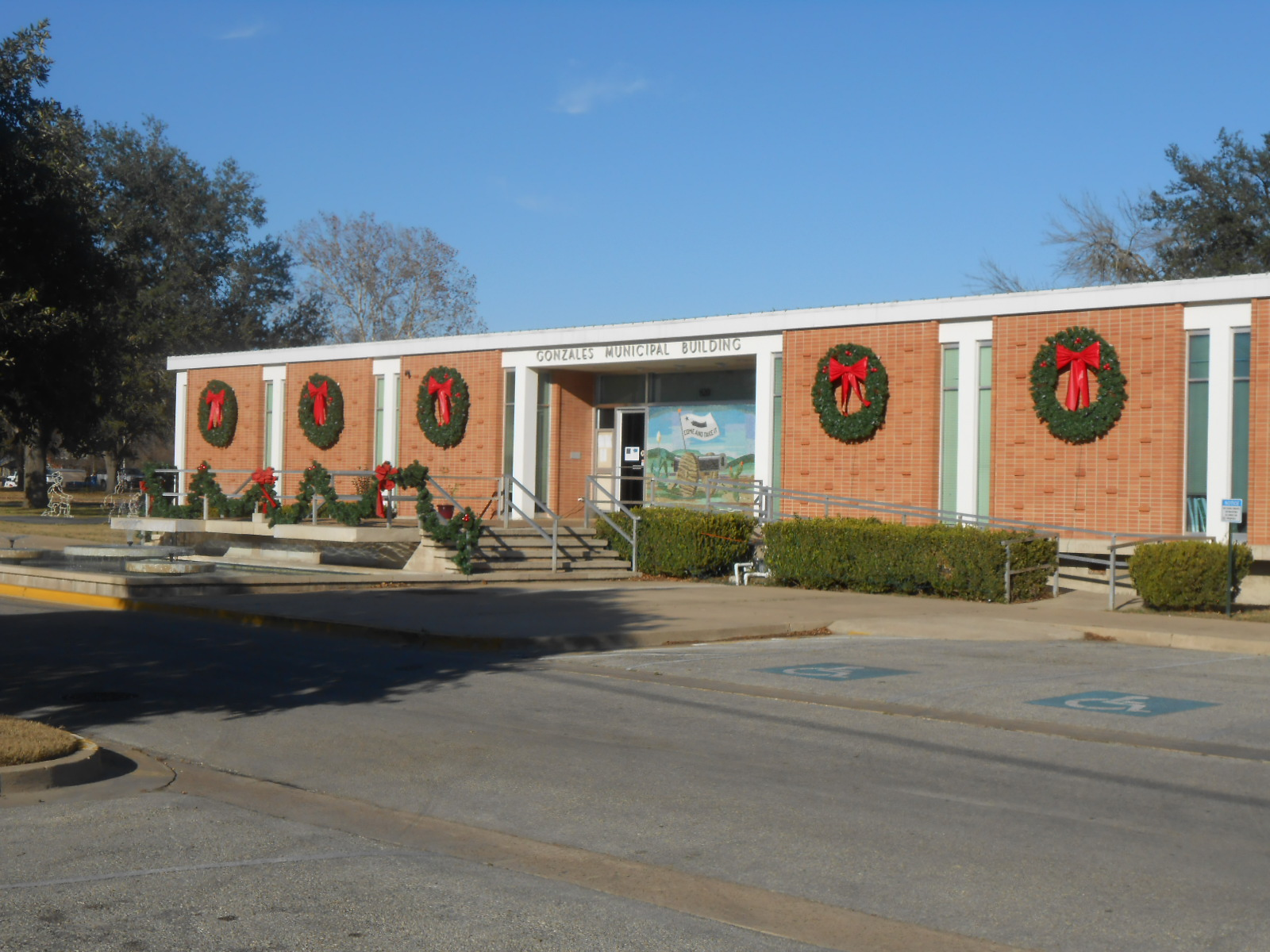
- Gonzales' Municipal Building on St. Joseph St. was built in 1959 from plans by Emil Niggli and Barton Riley.

- Flag Seal
- Motto: "Where the fight for Texas liberty began"
- Interactive map of Gonzales, Texas
- Coordinates: 29°30′12″N 97°26′52″W
- Subregion: Eagle Ford Shale
- Region: Austin Chalk
- County: Gonzales
- State: Texas
- Country: United States
- Founder: Green DeWitt
- Named for: Rafael Gonzáles

Area
  - Total: 6.08 sq mi (15.75 km^{2})
  - Land: 6.08 sq mi (15.75 km^{2})
  - Water: 0 sq mi (0.00 km^{2})
- Elevation: 325 ft (99 m)

Population (2020)
  - Total: 7,165
  - Density: 1,238.9/sq mi (478.34/km^{2})
- Time zone: UTC-6 (Central (CST))
  - Summer (DST): UTC-5 (CDT)
- ZIP code: 78629
- Area code: 830
- FIPS code: 48-30116
- GNIS feature ID: 2410618
- Website: www.gonzales.texas.gov

Gonzales is a city in the U.S. state of Texas, with a population of 7,165 at the 2020 census. It is the county seat of Gonzales County. Gonzales was the site of several integral events in the Texas Revolution, including the Battle of Gonzales, the "Come and Take It" incident, the ride of the Immortal 32 to the Battle of the Alamo, and the subsequent Runaway Scrape.

The city's cattle and poultry economy is enhanced by oilfield services and light manufacturing enterprises, a short rail connection to a major Union-Pacific rail line, and lodging oil field workers from the nearby Eagle Ford Shale.

== History ==
Gonzales is one of the earliest Anglo-American settlements in Texas, the first west of the Colorado River. It was established by Green DeWitt as the capital of his colony in August 1825. DeWitt named the community for Rafael Gonzáles, governor of Coahuila y Tejas. Informally, the community was known as the DeWitt Colony.

The original settlement (located where Highway 90-A crosses Kerr Creek) was abandoned in 1826 after two Indian attacks. It was rebuilt nearby in 1827. The town remains today as it was originally surveyed.

Gonzales is referred to as the "Lexington of Texas" because it was the site of the first skirmish of the Texas Revolution. In 1831, the Mexican government had granted Green DeWitt's request for a small cannon for protection against Indian attacks. At the outbreak of disputes between the Anglo settlers and the Mexican authorities in 1835, a contingent of more than 100 Mexican soldiers was sent from San Antonio to retrieve the cannon.

When the soldiers arrived, only 18 men were in Gonzales, but they refused to return the cannon, and men from the surrounding area soon joined them. Texians under the command of John Henry Moore confronted them. Sarah DeWitt and her daughter sewed a flag bearing the likeness of the cannon and the words "Come and Take It", which was flown when the first shots of Texian independence were fired on October 2, 1835. The Texians successfully resisted the Mexican troops in what became known as the Battle of Gonzales.

Gonzales later contributed 32 men from the Gonzales Ranging Company to the defense of the Alamo. It was the only city to send aid to the Alamo, and all 32 men lost their lives defending the site. Susanna Dickinson, widow of one of the Alamo defenders, and Joe, the slave of William B. Travis, fled to Gonzales with news of the Alamo massacre. General Sam Houston was there organizing the Texas forces. He anticipated the town would be the next target of General Antonio López de Santa Anna's Mexican army. Gathering the Texians at Peach Creek east of town, under the Sam Houston Oak, Houston ordered Gonzales burned, to deny it to the enemy. He began a retreat toward the U.S. border. The widows and orphans of Gonzales and their neighbors were forced to flee, thus precipitating the Runaway Scrape.

The town was derelict immediately after the Texas Revolution, but was eventually rebuilt on the original site in the early 1840s. By 1850, the town had a population of 300. The population rose to 1,703 by time of the 1860 census, 2,900 by the mid-1880s, and 4,297 in 1900. Part of the growth of the late 19th century can be attributed to the arrival of various immigrants, among them Jews, many of whom became peddlers and merchants.

== Geography ==
Gonzales is located in central Gonzales County, on the northeastern side of the Guadalupe River, just east of the mouth of the San Marcos River. U.S. Route 183 passes through the western side of the city, and U.S. Route 90 Alternate passes through the north of the city.

According to the United States Census Bureau, Gonzales has a total area of 6.1 square miles (15.7 km^{2}), all land.

=== Climate ===
The climate in this area is characterized by hot, humid summers and generally mild to cool winters. According to the Köppen Climate Classification system, Gonzales has a humid subtropical climate, abbreviated "Cfa" on climate maps.

Climate data for Gonzales, Texas (1991–2020 normals, extremes 1915–2023)
Month	Jan	Feb	Mar	Apr	May	Jun	Jul	Aug	Sep	Oct	Nov	Dec	Year
Record high °F (°C)	89 (32)	96 (36)	100 (38)	99 (37)	102 (39)	109 (43)	108 (42)	111 (44)	111 (44)	100 (38)	93 (34)	87 (31)	111 (44)
Mean maximum °F (°C)	78.7 (25.9)	82.2 (27.9)	86.1 (30.1)	90.1 (32.3)	93.6 (34.2)	98.0 (36.7)	99.0 (37.2)	101.2 (38.4)	97.5 (36.4)	92.5 (33.6)	85.9 (29.9)	80.2 (26.8)	102.5 (39.2)
Mean daily maximum °F (°C)	62.1 (16.7)	65.9 (18.8)	72.5 (22.5)	79.3 (26.3)	85.6 (29.8)	91.8 (33.2)	94.3 (34.6)	95.7 (35.4)	89.9 (32.2)	82.1 (27.8)	71.9 (22.2)	64.0 (17.8)	79.6 (26.4)
Daily mean °F (°C)	51.1 (10.6)	54.8 (12.7)	61.7 (16.5)	68.3 (20.2)	75.8 (24.3)	81.9 (27.7)	84.2 (29.0)	84.7 (29.3)	79.4 (26.3)	70.6 (21.4)	60.4 (15.8)	52.8 (11.6)	68.8 (20.4)
Mean daily minimum °F (°C)	40.1 (4.5)	43.7 (6.5)	51.0 (10.6)	57.3 (14.1)	66.0 (18.9)	72.1 (22.3)	74.0 (23.3)	73.7 (23.2)	68.8 (20.4)	59.0 (15.0)	49.0 (9.4)	41.6 (5.3)	58.0 (14.4)
Mean minimum °F (°C)	25.3 (−3.7)	29.2 (−1.6)	33.7 (0.9)	40.7 (4.8)	52.1 (11.2)	64.8 (18.2)	69.8 (21.0)	68.7 (20.4)	56.2 (13.4)	41.7 (5.4)	32.1 (0.1)	27.2 (−2.7)	23.2 (−4.9)
Record low °F (°C)	2 (−17)	7 (−14)	18 (−8)	31 (−1)	42 (6)	50 (10)	59 (15)	58 (14)	42 (6)	27 (−3)	21 (−6)	4 (−16)	2 (−17)
Average precipitation inches (mm)	2.37 (60)	2.07 (53)	2.80 (71)	2.82 (72)	4.68 (119)	3.41 (87)	1.95 (50)	2.92 (74)	3.58 (91)	3.94 (100)	2.73 (69)	2.66 (68)	35.93 (913)
Average snowfall inches (cm)	0.0 (0.0)	0.0 (0.0)	0.0 (0.0)	0.0 (0.0)	0.0 (0.0)	0.0 (0.0)	0.0 (0.0)	0.0 (0.0)	0.0 (0.0)	0.0 (0.0)	0.0 (0.0)	0.0 (0.0)	0.0 (0.0)
Average precipitation days (≥ 0.01 in)	7.3	7.1	6.5	4.9	5.6	6.2	4.6	4.9	6.7	4.8	5.8	6.4	70.8
Average snowy days (≥ 0.1 in)	0.0	0.0	0.0	0.0	0.0	0.0	0.0	0.0	0.0	0.0	0.0	0.0	0.0
Source: NOAA

== Demographics ==
Historical population
Census	Pop.	Note	%±
1850	307		—
1860	1,103		259.3%
1870	1,255		13.8%
1880	1,581		26.0%
1890	1,641		3.8%
1900	4,297		161.9%
1910	3,139		−26.9%
1920	3,128		−0.4%
1930	3,859		23.4%
1940	4,722		22.4%
1950	5,659		19.8%
1960	5,829		3.0%
1970	5,854		0.4%
1980	7,152		22.2%
1990	6,527		−8.7%
2000	7,202		10.3%
2010	7,237		0.5%
2020	7,165		−1.0%
U.S. Decennial Census

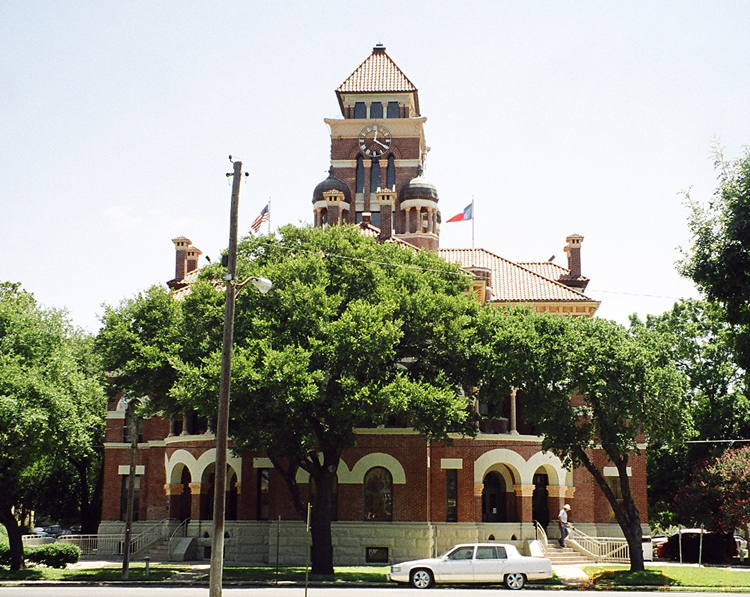
Gonzales County Courthouse, finished in 1896 to plans by J. Gordon Riely, the master of Texas courthouses

=== 2020 census ===
As of the 2020 census, Gonzales had a population of 7,165, 2,602 households, and 1,834 families residing in the city. The median age was 37.2 years, with 26.9% of residents under the age of 18 and 17.9% who were 65 years of age or older. For every 100 females there were 92.1 males, and for every 100 females age 18 and over there were 88.1 males.

97.0% of residents lived in urban areas, while 3.0% lived in rural areas.

There were 2,602 households in Gonzales, of which 37.2% had children under the age of 18 living in them. Of all households, 40.4% were married-couple households, 18.4% were households with a male householder and no spouse or partner present, and 34.2% were households with a female householder and no spouse or partner present. About 28.6% of all households were made up of individuals and 14.3% had someone living alone who was 65 years of age or older.

There were 2,986 housing units, of which 12.9% were vacant. The homeowner vacancy rate was 2.2% and the rental vacancy rate was 11.5%.

Racial composition as of the 2020 census
Race	Number	Percent
White	3,226	45.0%
Black or African American	723	10.1%
American Indian and Alaska Native	71	1.0%
Asian	42	0.6%
Native Hawaiian and Other Pacific Islander	0	0.0%
Some other race	1,558	21.7%
Two or more races	1,545	21.6%
Hispanic or Latino (of any race)	4,178	58.3%

=== 2010 census ===
As of the census of 2010, there were 7,237 people and 2,243 households in the city. The population density was 1,412.8 inhabitants per square mile (545.5/km^{2}). There were 2,869 housing units at an average density of 562.8 per square mile (217.3/km^{2}). The racial makeup of the city was 71.5% White, 7.40% African American, 1.00% Native American, 0.40% Asian, 0.00% Pacific Islander, 21.15% from other races, and 2.20% from two or more races. Hispanic or Latino of any race were 47.2% of the population.

There were 2,571 households, out of which 36.0% had children under the age of 18 living with them, 47.0% were married couples living together, 15.7% had a female householder with no husband present, and 31.4% were non-families. 28.2% of all households were made up of individuals, and 16.5% had someone living alone who was 65 years of age or older. The average household size was 2.73 and the average family size was 3.35.

In the city, the population was spread out, with 29.7% under the age of 18, 9.6% from 18 to 24, 24.9% from 25 to 44, 18.7% from 45 to 64, and 17.0% who were 65 years of age or older. The median age was 34 years. For every 100 females, there were 91.4 males. For every 100 females age 18 and over, there were 86.5 males.

The median income for a household in the city was $27,226, and the median income for a family was $34,663. Males had a median income of $22,804 versus $18,217 for females. The per capita income for the city was $12,866. About 14.8% of families and 20.9% of the population were below the poverty line, including 25.5% of those under age 18 and 23.0% of those age 65 or over.

== Arts and culture ==
=== Historic monuments and buildings ===
The site of the Battle of Gonzales, in the village of Cost, off Highway 97, is marked by a handsome stone and bronze monument commissioned by the State of Texas in 1910. The Gonzales Memorial Museum, built and dedicated by the State of Texas as part of the state's 1936 Centennial celebrations, houses the Come and Take It cannon and memorializes Gonzales's Old Eighteen and the Immortal 32. The monument at Texas Heroes Square is the work of the Italian-born San Antonio artist Pompeo Coppini, Texas' leading sculptor in his day.

The Gonzales County Courthouse (1896), on the National Register of Historic Places, is by the master of Texas courthouses, James Riely Gordon. Winning a country-wide competition for the Bexar County Courthouse in San Antonio launched Gordon's career, as the first of 72 courthouses, 18 of them in Texas (with 12 remaining in this state). J. Riely Gordon was also a master of the Romanesque Revival style, hugely popular in the 1890s, and seen here with good effect.

=== Historic houses ===
Gonzales has an exceptionally high concentration of historic houses and buildings.

In 2012, This Old House named Gonzales as one of the Best Old House Neighborhoods, noting its well-preserved downtown, its large stock of affordable and fixer-upper fine houses in Queen Anne, Tudor Revival, Italianate, and Greek Revival styles, as well as the town's low cost of living and convenience to the big cities of Austin, San Antonio, and Houston.

The oldest dwellings in Gonzales date to the mid-19th century, but most of the architecturally notable houses were constructed beginning in the late Victorian period, from about 1880 to about 1915. Queen Anne style houses are the most common, with Colonial Revival and Classical Revival houses as well. J. Riely Gordon and Atlee B. Ayers were among the renowned architects active here. Many of the most notable homes, built for the important families of Gonzales, were erected along St. Louis St. and St. Lawrence St. Those two roads edge, to the south and north, a long stretch of public land one block wide running from the historic downtown commercial center and courthouse all the way to Kerr Creek to the east.

== Education ==
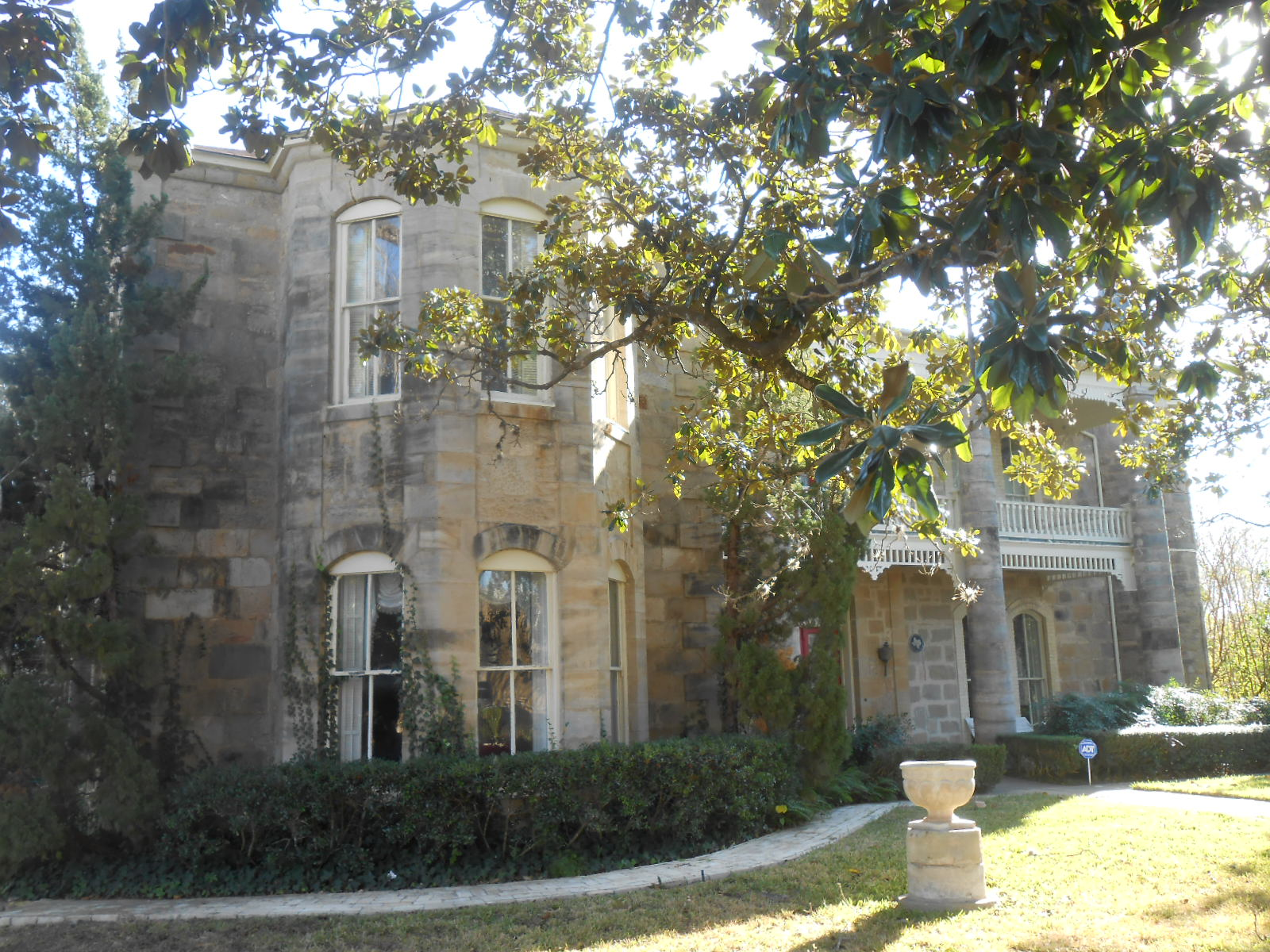
Gonzales College, now a private residence.

During the 19th century, the town was a center for higher education in Texas. Construction of Gonzales College began in 1851, and it opened in 1853, with 50 students. An 1855 addition for the men's program was torn down during the Civil War; the materials were used to build Fort Waul, just to the north of the town. By 1857, the school granted bachelor of arts degrees to females, making it one of the earliest colleges in Texas to do so. The college was purchased in 1891, and its building converted into a private residence by W.M. Atkinson.

The city of Gonzales is served by the Gonzales Independent School District and is home to the Gonzales High School Apaches. According to the University Interscholastic League of Texas, the Gonzales Apaches football team is in the 4A-1 Region IV District 15; Division: 4A-1.

The city of Gonzales also is home to the Gonzales Center, a branch of the Victoria College which is located in Victoria, Texas.

== Media ==
The Gonzales Inquirer was established in 1853. It is one of the six oldest county newspapers still operating in Texas. Radio station KCTI was established in Gonzales in 1947.

== Notable people ==
- Phil Coe (1839–1871), saloon owner and gambler, killed in gunfight of "Wild Bill" Hickok
- John Joel Glanton (1819–1850) Texas Ranger and Glanton Gang member
- Jerry Hall (born 1956), model, actress, and Mick Jagger's long-time companion
- Myra Hemmings (1895–1968) was a founder and first president of Delta Sigma Theta sorority
- George W. Littlefield (1842–1920), Confederate officer, cattleman, and regent of the University of Texas at Austin
- Tom Sestak (1936–1987) defensive tackle for Buffalo Bills; 1962–1968 Member of the All-Time AFL Team
- William Stubbs, award-winning American interior designer, author, and television show host, born in Gonzales
