= DeLeon Plaza and Bandstand =

- U.S. National Register of Historic Places
- Recorded Texas Historic Landmark
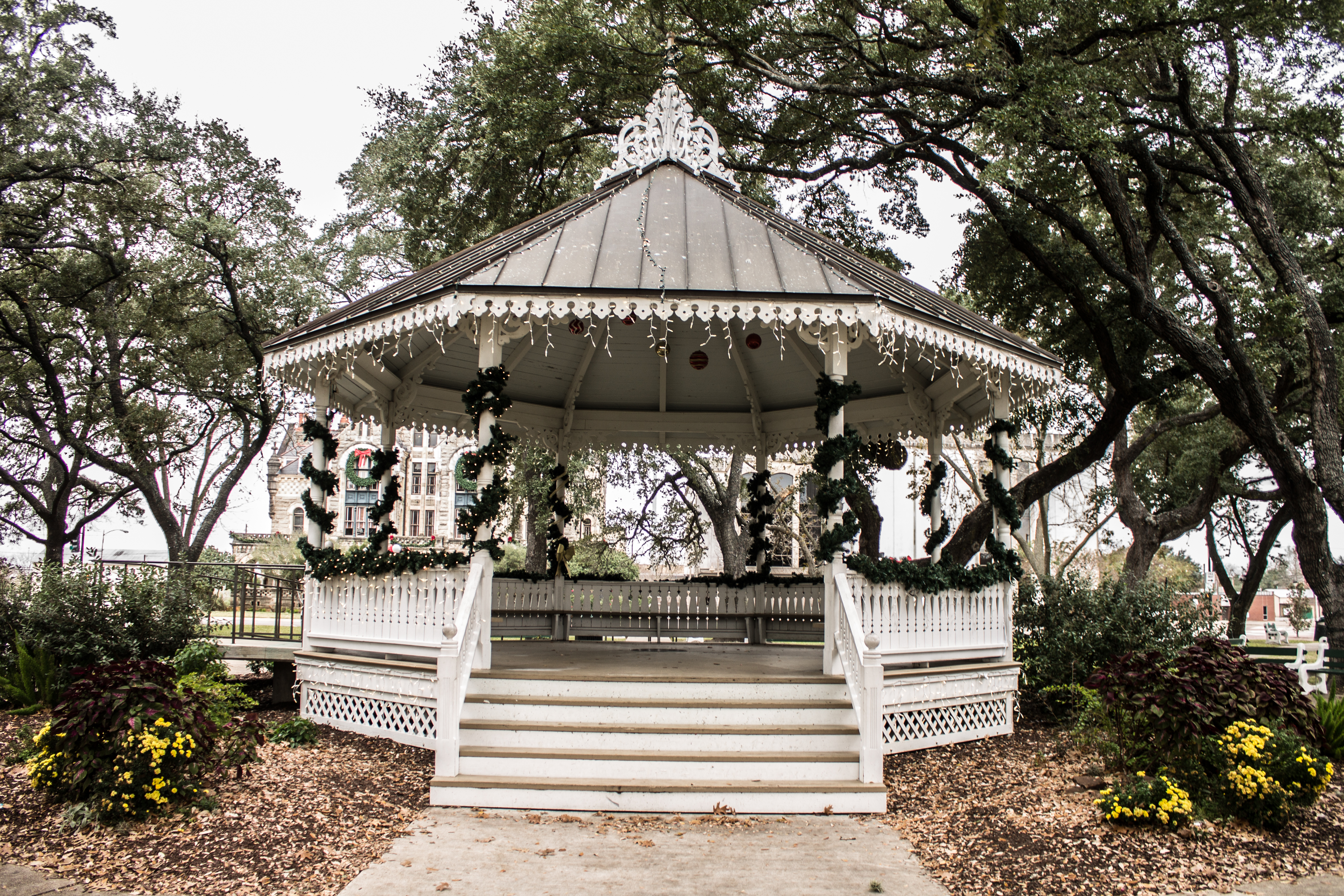
- DeLeon Plaza and Bandstand in 2015

- Location within Texas Location within the United States
- Location: 100 blk. W. Constitution, Victoria, Texas
- Coordinates: 28°47′57″N 97°0′22″W
- Area: less than one acre
- Built: 1839
- Architect: Edward Linn, J.D. Mitchell
- Architectural style: Bandstand
- MPS: Victoria MRA
- NRHP reference No.: 86002584
- RTHL No.: 289

Significant dates
- Added to NRHP: March 24, 1987
- Designated RTHL: 1965

DeLeon Plaza and Bandstand is 1.77 acres originally platted as the center of the city of Victoria, county of Victoria, in the U.S. state of Texas. The bandstand stood near the plaza until it was moved to the center of the plaza in 1923. The William P. Rogers chapter of the United Daughters of the Confederacy contracted with sculptor Pompeo Coppini for the DeLeon Plaza's 1912 monument to the Confederacy The Last Stand (aka Firing Line).

On March 24, 1987, DeLeon Plaza and Bandstand was added to the National Register of Historic Places listings in Victoria County, Texas. In 1965, the bandstand was designated a Recorded Texas Historic Landmark, Marker number 289. In 1998, the plaza was designated a Recorded Texas Historic Landmark, Marker number 12273.

== Plaza ==
When Victoria, Texas was founded by empresario Martín De León and his wife Patricia de la Garza De León, they named it after Guadalupe Victoria, who had just become the first president of Mexico. The town was platted by surveyor José María Jesús Carbajal around a Market Square designed in 1839 by Edward Linn and known today as DeLeon Plaza. The bandstand at the center of the plaza was built prior to 1885.

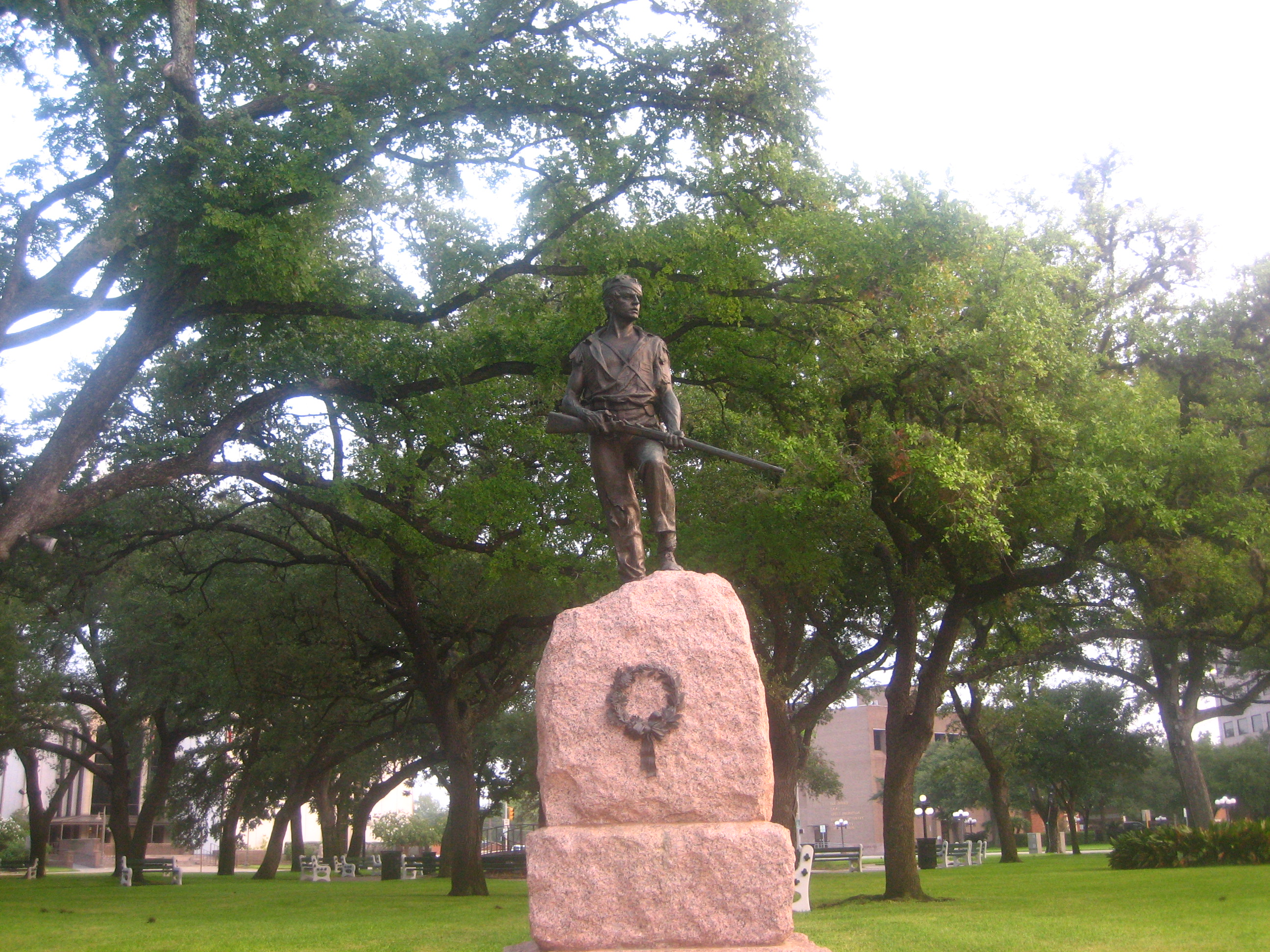
Confederate Monument at DeLeon Plaza created by Pompeo Coppini

Sculptor Pompeo Coppini was paid $5,000, raised by the William P. Rogers chapter of the United Daughters of the Confederacy, to create the plaza's monument The Last Stand (aka Firing Line) in 1912. The unveiling was held on July 12 of that year. The celebratory event was the scene of a parade and a barbecue that was free to everyone. The ceremony included various dignitaries, two Union Army veterans, and twelve Confederate States Army veterans.

In 1923, the "Memorial White Way" lighting was turned on at DeLeon Plaza. That same year the bandstand was moved from a nearby location and placed over the site of the town's old water source.

The landscaping was re-done in 1940 as a project of the Works Progress Administration under the presidency of Franklin D. Roosevelt, whose public works and welfare projects helped many people throughout the South. Mr. and Mrs. J. M. Pickering completed a restoration of the bandstand in 1962. That same year, a Six Flags monument was placed on the plaza at the corner of Main and Constitution streets. The plaza today has twenty-three benches and forty-seven trees of live oak, elm, pecan, ash, magnolia, and redwood.

On December 31, 1986, a time capsule was placed in DeLeon Plaza, to be opened at the 2036 Texas Bicentennial.

== See also ==
- National Register of Historic Places listings in Victoria County, Texas
- Recorded Texas Historic Landmarks in Victoria County
