= Fernando De León =

Co-founder De León's Colony

- Born: 1798; Tamaulipas
- Died: 1853 (aged 55); Texas
- Resting place: Evergreen Cemetery; Victoria, Texas; 28°48′41″N 97°00′36″W
- Known for: Co-founder De León's Colony; Fought in Texas War of Independence; Aide-de-camp to James W. Robinson
- Spouses: María Antonia Galván; Luz Escalera
- Children: Son w/Maria; Adopted brother Silvestre's sons Martín and Francisco
- Parent(s): Martín De León; Patricia de la Garza De León

Fernando De León (1798–1853) was a co-founder of Victoria, Texas, and the first commissioner and colonization manager of De León's Colony. He fought against Antonio López de Santa Anna. De León was an aide-de-camp to provisional Texas governor James W. Robinson. In the war's confusion about Mexican loyalties, De León was first incarcerated by the Mexican army, only to be released and be incarcerated by the Texas army. When his brother Silvestre was murdered, he adopted Silvestre's sons. After the war, he legally recovered 50,000 acres (200 km^{2}; 78 sq mi) of his land that had been redistributed to Texans. Recorded Texas Historic Landmark number 6541 placed at Evergreen Cemetery in 1972 acknowledges Fernando De León's contribution to Texas.

== Early life ==
Fernando De León was born in 1798 in Cruillas, Nuevo Santander (Tamaulipas), the first-born child of empresario Martín De León and his wife Patricia de la Garza De León.

== Texas ==
=== De León's Colony ===
On April 13, 1824, the Mexican government approved a contract allowing Martín De León to settle forty-one Mexican families on the lower Guadalupe River. Coahuila y Tejas appointed Fernando the first commissioner and colonization manager of De León's Colony. He employed Plácido Benavides as his secretary. Martín De León died in the 1833 cholera epidemic, and Fernando took over the role and responsibilities of his father. He established his Rancho Escondido seven miles north of town.

=== War against Santa Anna ===
When Antonio López de Santa Anna revoked the 1824 Constitution of Mexico and installed his own political machine in 1833, many Tejanos were opposed to the regime. When Stephen F. Austin issued an 1835 appeal for arms to equip the Texans in the war against Santa Anna, Fernando De León, his brother-in-law José María Jesús Carbajal and Peter Kerr, began to run livestock to New Orleans to trade for munitions. During a pursuit by the Mexican warship Bravo on the return trip with the purchased equipment, the crew was forced to dump the cargo into the Gulf of Mexico. The crew of the Bravo boarded the Hannah Elizabeth, taking several prisoners. Carbajal and De León were incarcerated at Brazos Santiago, but Kerr was set free. Fernando De León was released with payment of a bribe. Carbajal was transferred to Matamoros, Tamaulipas, with an intended transfer for imprisonment at San Juan de Ulloa. Plácido Benavides bribed the guards at Matamoros to effect an escape for Carbajal, who afterwards returned to Victoria. The three men were never recompensed for their loss.

=== Aide-de-camp to Governor Robinson ===
In February 1836, De León was appointed as aide-de-camp to provisional Texas governor James W. Robinson. He was put in charge of the local militia. In March, following the Battle of Coleto, Mexican General José de Urrea seized Victoria and arrested De León. Urrea forced De León to disclose all hidden supplies and horses. Even though he had the information he wanted, Urrea kept De León imprisoned. De León was freed when Urrea departed Victoria, only to be arrested as a traitor by Texas Brigadier General Thomas Jefferson Rusk. In July 1836, General Rusk forced the Carbajal, Benavides and De León families to leave Victoria. They evacuated to New Orleans, leaving behind all their possessions.

De León returned about 1844 to reclaim the family property, but did not become head of the De León clan. Leadership of the De León family rested with matriarch Patricia de la Garza De León. Fernando De León did, however, manage to regain 50,000 acres (200 km^{2}; 78 sq mi) of his property.

== Personal life ==
De León married María Antonia Galván before the start of the De León Colony. The couple had one son who died in Louisiana. He remarried to Luz Escalera. When his brother Silvestre De León was murdered, he adopted Silvestre's sons Martin and Francisco.

== Death ==
Fernando De León died at his home in Rancho Escondido in 1853. He is buried in Evergreen Cemetery in Victoria, Texas. Recorded Texas Historic Landmark number 6541 placed at Evergreen Cemetery in 1972 acknowledges Fernando De León's contribution to Texas.
