= De León's Colony =

Coordinates: 28.6082°N 96.9891°W

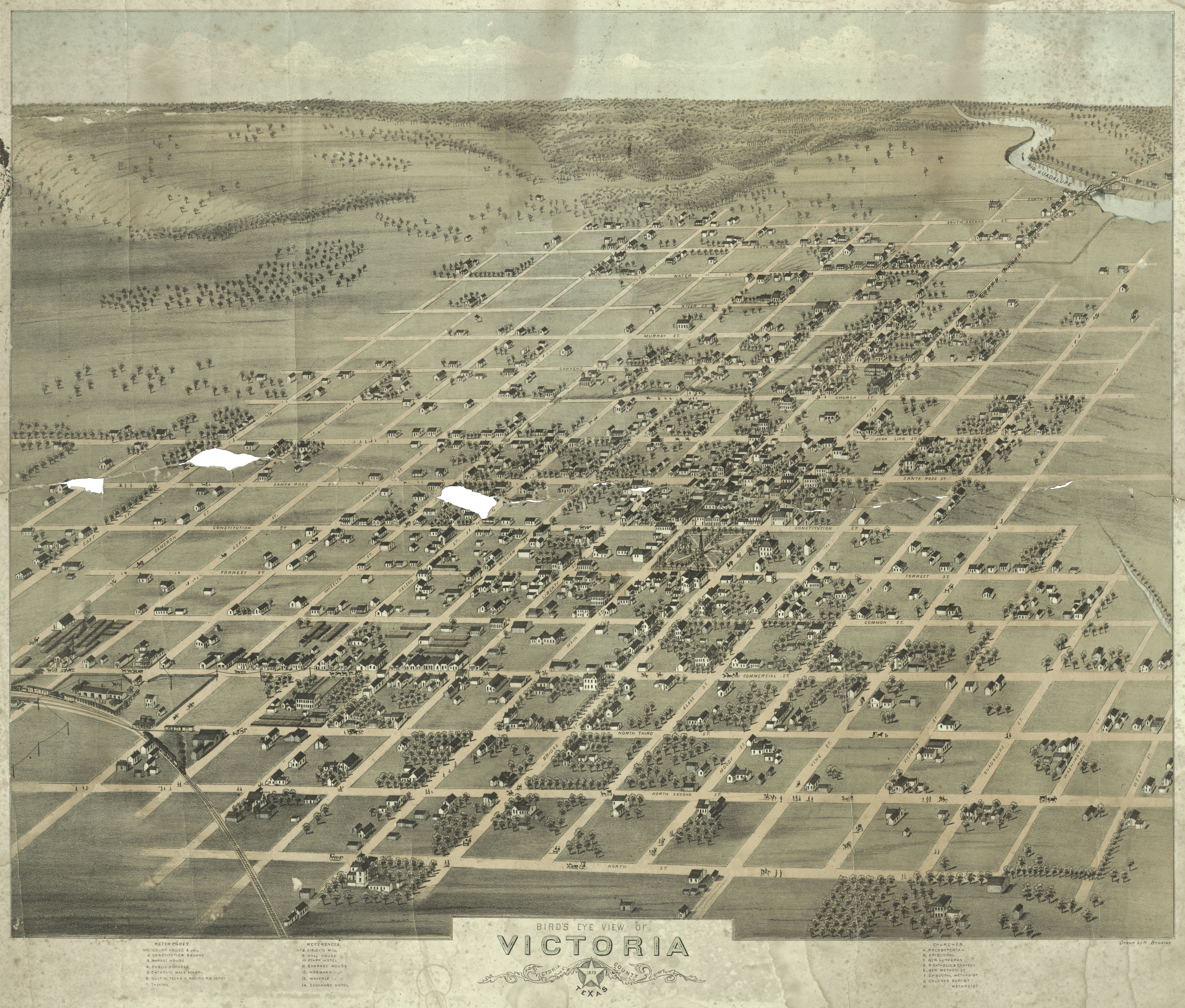
1873. Bird's Eye View of Victoria, Texas

De León's Colony was established in 1824 in the northern Coahuila y Tejas state of the First Mexican Republic, by empresario Martín De León. It was the only ethnically Mexican colony founded during the Mexican period (1824-1835) that is located within the present-day U.S. state of Texas.

Victoria was the center of the colony. Attracting new settlers to this area was part of an effort by the Mexican government to develop Coahuila y Tejas, which was sparsely populated. De León was one of several empresarios who were granted colonization contracts by the Mexican government. Others were Stephen F. Austin, Green DeWitt, Haden Edwards, David G. Burnet, Lorenzo de Zavala and Sterling C. Robertson. Of these, only De León and Austin successfully established colonies. Upon De León's death in 1833, his colony's value was estimated at $1 million.

== Petitions to the Spanish government ==
In 1799, Martín De León and his wife Patricia de la Garza De León established a cattle ranch in Spanish Texas, in the area of present-day San Patricio County, Texas. In both 1807 and 1809, Martín de León petitioned the Spanish government in the Viceroyalty of New Spain for permission to colonize in this area. Both petitions were denied.

== Petition to Mexican government ==
After Mexico gained its independence from Spain in 1821, colonization possibilities looked more favorable. On April 13, 1824, prior to the 1824 Constitution of Mexico enactment on October 4, the provisional Mexican government approved a contract allowing De León to settle forty-one Mexican families on the lower Guadalupe and Lavaca rivers, in the vicinity of Coleto, Garcitas, Arenosa, and Zorillo (Placido) creeks. Under the contract, each settler received a town lot, plus one league (4,228 acres) of grazing land and one labor (177 acres) of arable land. It was the only colony in Texas settled predominately by Mexicans, as opposed to colonists who immigrated from outside Mexico. De León was to receive five leagues (22,140-acres) upon the settlement of the forty-one families. De León located his ranch along Garcitas Creek.

== Establishing the colony ==
Patricia de la Garza De León invested $9,800 from her inheritance into the colony, plus another $300 valuation of cows, horses, and mules. Coahuila y Tejas appointed her son, Fernando De León, as the first commissioner and colonization manager of De León's Colony. Plácido Benavides became De Leon's secretary. The settlement provided for a living for Catholic priests and land for a school. Benavides built a house fortress, fortified with first-floor gun slits and a reinforced door. It was known as "Plácido's Round House" and the "Round Top House".

The settlement was originally named "Nuestra Señora de Guadalupe Victoria" in honor of Guadalupe Victoria, who had just become the first president of Mexico, and the Guadalupe River. Empresario Martín De León was appointed as the settlement's first alcalde. His assistant Plácido Benavides would become the second alcalde, and his son Silvestre De León was the third. When José María Jesús Carbajal platted the town, De León named the main street Calle de los Diez Amigos (Street of Ten Friends), after the ten leading citizens entrusted with leadership of the community. The ten friends were:

- Martín De León
- Fernando De León, a son
- Silvestre De León, a son
- José María Jesús Carbajal
- Plácido Benavides
- Rafael Manchola
- Leónardo Manso
- Julian de la Garza, brother-in-law
- Valentino Garcia
- Pedro Gellardro

=== Conflict with Green DeWitt ===
A conflict arose when the Coahuila y Tejas state government granted an empresario contract to Green DeWitt on April 15, 1825. The new government had not yet received notification of where De León had established his grant's settlement of Guadalupe Victoria, and included that area in DeWitt's contract. On October 6, 1825, the Coahuila y Tejas government settled the dispute in favor of De León.

But competitive conflicts broke out between De León and Dewitt, with an October 26, 1826 incident that resulted in De León and his son-in-law Rafael Manchola arresting DeWitt. American Stephen F. Austin, another empresario in Texas, was called on to resolve the issues.

In 1829 De León was authorized by the Coahuila y Tejas government to bring an additional 150 families to the colony. His contract expired in 1831, and the government denied him an extension. In May 1832, the government ruled in favor of De León's colonists settling on DeWitt's land.

== Legacy ==
Martín De León died of cholera in 1833, during an epidemic that swept towns along many of North America's waterways. Upon his death, the estimated wealth of his colony was $1 million. The government authorized his son Fernando De León to assume his father's position as empresario. More than one hundred titles were given in the colony by July 1835.

Other empresarios granted colonization contracts under the Mexican government were Stephen F. Austin, Green DeWitt, Haden Edwards, David G. Burnet, Lorenzo de Zavala and Sterling C. Robertson. Martín De León and Stephen F. Austin were the only empresarios who completely fulfilled their contracts.
