= History of Mexican Americans in Texas =

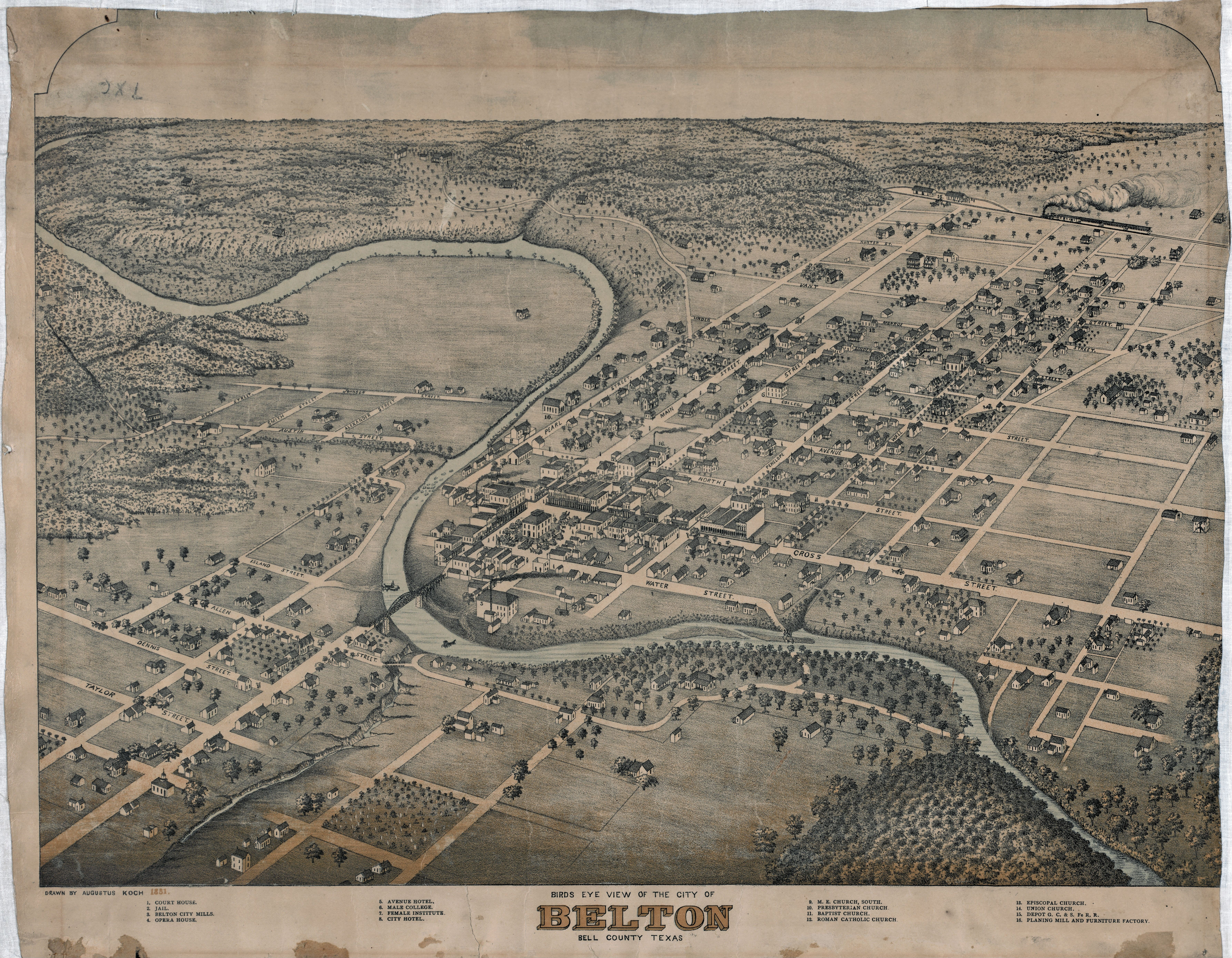
Map of Belton

In the 2020 Census, 33.3% of Texans identified with "Mexican, Mexican Am., or Chicano" origins.

== Early history ==
Indigenous peoples lived in the area now known as Texas long before Spanish explorers arrived in the area. However, once Spaniards arrived and claimed the area for Spain, a process known as mestizaje occurred, in which Spaniards and Native Americans had mestizo children who had both Spanish and indigenous blood. Texas was ruled by Spain as part of its New Spain territory from 1520, when Spaniards first arrived in Mexico in 1520, until Texas won independence from Mexico in 1836, which led to the Treaty of Guadalupe-Hidalgo (1848). In 1830, the Mexican population fell to 20 percent and in 1840 down to 10 percent. When Spanish rule in Texas ended, Mexicans in Texas numbered 5,000. In 1850 over 14,000 Texas residents had Mexican origin.

=== Migration and farmworking ===
In 1911 an extremely bloody decade-long civil war broke out in Mexico. Hundreds of thousands of refugees fled to Texas, raising the Hispanic population from 72,000 in 1900 to 250,000 in 1920. Most job opportunities for them involved working on a ranch or a farm starting from South Texas and moving north and northeast. Mexican immigrants, frequently working in harsh conditions for little pay, were instrumental in the late 19th-century construction of the railroad network that linked Texas to the rest of the United States. The number reached 700,000 in 1930, 1,400,000 in 1960, and 4 million in 1990.

== Media ==
La Prensa was a daily Spanish language newspaper published in San Antonio. It was started in 1913 by Ignacio E. Lozano and covered the Mexican Revolution and other stories from Mexico. It was closed in 1963. El Bejarano (San Antonio) was a Spanish language newspaper published in San Antonio. It was started in 1855 and became a platform for Mexican and Mexican American activism.

== Geography ==
Hispanics of Mexican descent dominate southern, south-central, and western Texas and form a significant portion of the residents in the cities of Austin, Dallas, Houston, and San Antonio. Mexican Americans in Texas have made cultural contributions that have influenced the state's personality and continue to have an impact on larger American culture, such as Tejano music and the blending of culinary traditions. The Hispanic population contributes to Texas having a younger population than the American average, because Hispanic births have outnumbered non-Hispanic white births since the early 1990s. In 2007, for the first time since the early nineteenth century, Hispanics accounted for more than half of all births (50.2%), while non-Hispanic whites accounted for just (34%).

== Lynching of Mexican-Americans in Texas ==
From 1848 to 1928 there were hundreds of lynchings of Mexican-Americans across the American West. Many of these lynchings occurred in Texas against people of Mexican descent. One such case was the case of Paulino Serda of Edinburg, a city in south Texas. Paulino Serda was killed by Texas Rangers on his ranch in 1915 during questioning. In September of that same year, Texas Rangers encountered Jesus Bazan and Antonio Longoria riding their horses near their ranch in Edinburg, Texas. Even though they had committed no crimes, the Texas Rangers shot and killed the two men on the assumption that were Mexican bandit sympathizers; they left their bodies where they were shot to be found by locals two days later. Many more Mexican nationals and Mexican-Americans living in the Texas-Mexico border were killed during this period, now designated as La Matanza.

== Education ==
Post Mexican-American War the United States signed the Treaty of Guadalupe Hidalgo, which extended the racial category of white to Mexican Americans, as well as the Texas Constitution which guaranteed equal rights to Mexican-Americans such as the right to free public education. Despite having access to education, and being considered white in the eyes of the law, public schools in Texas were segregated Mexican students from white students until 1965, and often times Mexican-Americans living in Texas didn’t receive the same treatment compared to their white neighbors. This differential treatment towards Mexican-American student included (but was not limited to) the banning of speaking Spanish on school grounds, in which violators could legally be punished through beatings. Similar legal battles were sparked by the California case Mendez v. Westminster in 1947, where Mexican-American families battled to end educational segregation and guarantee equal opportunity for their children in Texas. Some Mexican American organizations who played a major role in the fight against racism in public schools are the American G.I Forum, LULAC, and MALDEF. Mexican-American groups led the push for bilingual education in Texas in the 1970s, claiming that keeping the Spanish language was important for preserving cultural legacy as well as improving academic performance for Hispanic students.

=== The rise of Mexican American organization and social movement. ===
TAMACC which stands for Texas Association of Mexican Americans Chamber of Commerce is an organization founded in 1975 to promote business, economic, and legislative opportunities for the Hispanic communities in Texas.TAMAAC have supported many bills that will help small hispanic business such as the 1991 Workers Compensation Bill and the free trade agreement with Mexico in 1992.

Mexican Americans also formed the Chicano Civil Rights Movement which goal was to help better the lives of Mexican Americans whether it be economic, politically , or socially.

Currently , now there are multiple organizations and associations that help fight educational opportunities and professional development towards Hispanic students such as the Association of Latino Professionals for America (ALPFA) and the Society of Hispanic Professional Engineers(SHPE).

== Notable persons ==
- Plácido Benavides
- José Antonio Burciaga
- José María Jesús Carbajal
- Patricia de la Garza De León
- Martín De León
- Luis Jiménez
- Rafael Manchola
- Octavio Medellín
- George I. Sánchez
- Edgar Valdez Villarreal
- Judith Zaffirini
- Selena
- Gloria Anzaldúa

== See also ==
- Hispanic and Latino Americans in Texas
- History of the African-Americans in Texas
- History of education in Texas
- Tejano
- Tex-Mex
- Plan of San Diego, call for insurrection in 1915 that Tejanos rejected
