= Saint Mary's Catholic Church (Victoria, Texas) =

Historic church in Texas, United States

- U.S. National Register of Historic Places
- Recorded Texas Historic Landmark
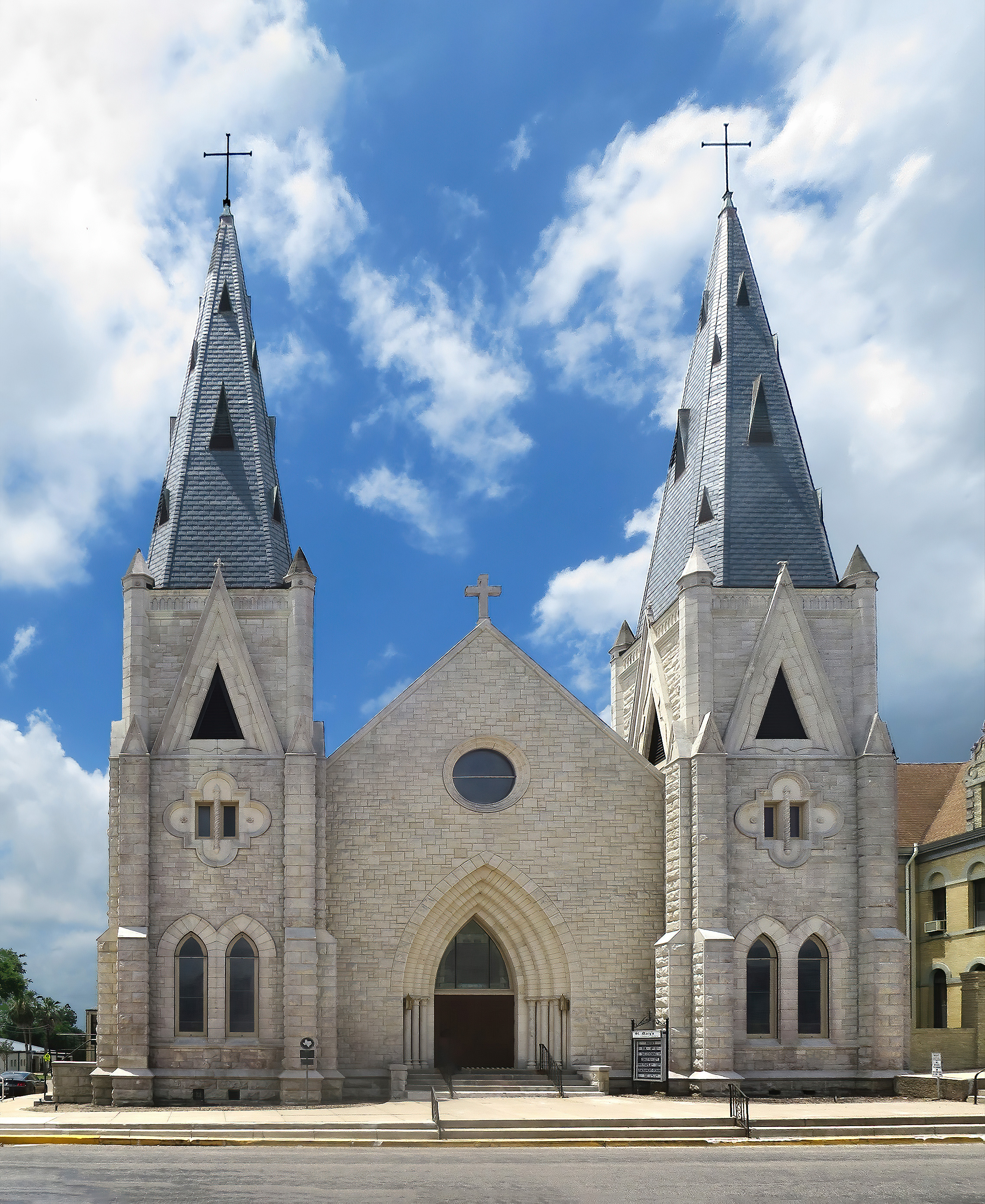
- Saint Mary's Church in 2008

- Location within Texas Location within the United States
- Location: 101 W. Church Street, Victoria, Texas
- Coordinates: 28°47′46″N 97°0′26″W
- Area: 2.1 acres (0.85 ha)
- Built: 1903-1904
- Built by: Bailey Mills; Fred Urban (supervisor)
- Architect: Nicholas J. Clayton (original design); Phelps & King (revised design)
- Architectural style: Gothic Revival
- MPS: Victoria MRA
- NRHP reference No.: 86002450
- RTHL No.: 6566

Significant dates
- Added to NRHP: December 9, 1986
- Designated RTHL: 1964

Saint Mary's Catholic Church is the second-oldest Roman Catholic parish in Texas and the first canonically established in the Republic of Texas. Located on 101 W. Church Street in Victoria, Texas, St. Mary's was founded in 1824 and reestablished in 1840. The current Gothic Revival limestone church was finished in 1904 after the original design by Nicholas J. Clayton was revised by San Antonio architects Phelps & King and constructed by contractor Bailey Mills with Fred Urban as supervisor. In 1964, the church was designated as a Recorded Texas Historic Landmark and was listed on the National Register of Historic Places in 1986.

== History ==
=== Founding and early parish ===
When Martín De León founded Guadalupe Victoria in 1824, one of his first decisions as a Catholic was to have a church built. In October of 1825, he requested permission for the construction of a church, and asked that a priest be sent to minister to the colony. The following month, the petition was approved. De León's wife, Patricia de la Garza De León, contributed $500 in gold and furnishings for the chapel, which initially was likely a small jacal structure built near the present Main and Church streets site by 1826 and in use by 1830. Upon the initial completion, it was dedicated to Our Lady of Guadalupe and was named Nuestra Señora de Guadalupe de Jesús Victoria.

The first church to have been built was without a resident priest and was intermittently served by clergy from the nearby Mission La Bahia. Both during and after the Texas Revolution, many of the original Mexican families fled. Later, the church was used as a barracks, courthouse, and even a Presbyterian Church.

On July 12, 1840, Jean-Marie Odin and three other Vincentian priests made it to Texas to bring structure to the disorganized Catholic life of the republic. Odin assigned Eudaldus Estany to Victoria as the first resident pastor. The chapel which had been reclaimed was repaired and weatherproofed, with the first wedding being held on July 29, 1840, and the first baptism happening on the following day. Upon its reestablishment in the same year, St. Mary's became the first Catholic parish to be canonically established in the Republic of Texas.

=== Nineteenth-century changes ===
When Fr. Augustine Gardet arrived in 1856, the laity outgrew the chapel and the need for a larger church was quickly recognized. A larger church began to be built in 1858 at Church and Bridge streets on land given by Patricia de la Garza De León. The new church was completed in 1863, with bricks made locally from Guadalupe River sand and walls finished with a shell-lime plaster intended to provide the building with a stuccoed appearance despite its brick construction.

In 1866, Fr. Gardet brought the Sisters of the Incarnate Word and Blessed Sacrament to Victoria. The sisters opened a convent school in January of 1867 which would later be known as Nazareth Academy. Fr. Gardet founded St. Joseph's School for boys in 1868 and later expanded it into a seminary.

=== Present church ===
By the late 1800s, the church was not only too small for the congregation but also in disrepair after the 1886 hurricane. Under Fr. Lawrence Wyer, plans for a new church were put into place and Galveston architect Nicholas J. Clayton was commissioned for the construction in the 1890s. On July 12, 1898, construction began. Surviving drawings from the time also show a connection between Corpus Christi architect Charles Carroll and the first phase of construction. In 1899, construction stopped as the first contractor defaulted right as the walls had risen to just below the church windows.

In 1903, construction resumed. San Antonio architect Henry T. Phelps simplified Clayton's design while maintaining its overall profile, and parish records show that Phelps and King prepared the plans and specifications used for completion. Bishop John Forest contracted with the Bailey Mills Construction Company, and J. D. Mitchell supervised the project locally. The cornerstone was laid on December 21, 1903, the parish bells were moved to the east tower in May 1904, and the church was dedicated on October 5, 1904.

The National Register nomination mentions that many of the individuals who hauled and cut the limestone used for the church were the same Italian laborers that had come to Texas to work on the Texas State Capitol and Victoria County courthouse. The interior furnishing and decoration continued after the dedication, and the altars, Stations of the Cross, and stained-glass windows were formally dedicated in 1908. The old brick church was soon after demolished, and the Nazareth convent building was built beside the new church in 1904-1905.

Monsignor F.O. Beck, who was the pastor from 1941 to 1967, directed a major remodeling effort in 1954 as well as the construction of the present rectory in 1959.

== Architecture ==
St. Mary's is a cruciform limestone Gothic Revival church facing Market Square in downtown Victoria. The exterior of the church is made of random-laid or sawn ashlar limestone articulated by smooth-stone trim. The most prominent features include paired lancet-arched stained-glass windows, two towers capped by steep spires, and a recessed main entrance that is framed by Gothic arches and colonnettes. There exists a round window above the main entrance depicting Our Lady of Guadalupe, referencing the dedication of the parish's first chapel.

There are several additional exterior details mentioned in the parish history, including tower quatrefoils, triangular gable vents, a 1903-inscribed capstone on the east gable, and a side entrance added in 1934. The National Register nomination describes the building as a limestone Gothic Revival church with a gabled roof behind parapets and notes the alterations introduced post-Second Vatican Council which included changes to the altar and sanctuary.

Much of the interior decoration was installed between 1904 and 1908. The high altar, which was donated by Minnie Pridham in memory of her husband and son, was installed in 1906. The Stations of the Cross were imported from Munich and dedicated in 1908; and many of the stained-glass windows were created by G. C. Riordan & Company of Cincinnati between 1907 and 1954. A marble baptismal font was also donated by Italian families, and a vestibule was added in 1911. There was further work to improve comfort during winter weather in 1934, and a lowered ceiling and sanctuary remodeling happened in 1954. The stained-glass was restored in 1991-1992, and the organ in 1997.

== Historic designation ==
The Texas Historical Commission designated St. Mary's as a Recorded Texas Historic Landmark in 1964. In 1986, the church was listed on the National Register of Historic Places as part of the Historic Resources of Victoria Multiple Resource Area.

== See also ==
- National Register of Historic Places listings in Victoria County, Texas
- Recorded Texas Historic Landmarks in Victoria County
