= Silvestre De León =

- Born: 1802; Texas, US
- Died: 1842 (aged 40); Texas, US
- Resting place: Evergreen Cemetery; Victoria, Texas; 28°48′41″N 97°00′36″W
- Known for: Co-founder De León's Colony; Fought at Siege of Béxar
- Spouse: Rosalie de la Garza De León
- Children: Martín; Francisco (adopted by Fernando De León)
- Parent(s): Martín De León; Patricia de la Garza De León

Silvestre De León (1802–1842) was the second son born to the influential De León family in Victoria, Texas. He became the third alcalde of Victoria. De León joined his brother-in-law Plácido Benavides to fight with Stephen F. Austin at the 1835 Siege of Béxar. He joined the rest of the De León family in New Orleans in 1836 after Brigadier General Thomas Jefferson Rusk ordered the evacuation of Mexican families from Victoria. In 1842, he returned to Victoria and was murdered by persons unknown. Texas Historical Marker number 6544 placed at Evergreen Cemetery in 1972 acknowledges Silvestre De León's contribution to Texas.

== Early life ==
Silvestre De León was born in 1802 in Texas, the third child of empresario Martín De León and his wife Patricia de la Garza De León. Older brother Fernando De León had been born in Mexico in 1798. Sister Candelaria, who married José Miguel Aldrete, was born in Texas in 1800. They would eventually be joined by two more brothers: Felix (1806) and Agapito (1808). Five more sisters would also be born into the family: Guadalupe (1804) who married Desedrio Garcia; Maria (1810) who married Rafael Manchola; Refugia (1812) who married José María Jesús Carbajal; Augustina (1814) who married Plácido Benavides; and Francisca (1818) who married Vincente Dosal.

== Alcalde ==
Along with his family, Silvestre was one of the co-founders of De León's Colony, becoming a colonial merchant, as well as co-founder of the city of Victoria, Texas.

De León became the third alcalde of Victoria. Martín De León had been the first alcalde, while Silvestre's brother-in-law Plácido Benavides had been the second. After Benavides built the fortress known as "Plácido's Round House" (or the "Round Top House") the two brothers-in-law engaged in several attacks against the Tonkawa and Karankawa Indian tribes.

== War against Santa Anna ==
When Antonio López de Santa Anna revoked the 1824 Constitution of Mexico and installed his own political machine in 1833, many Tejanos were opposed to the regime. Some of the De León extended family, specifically Benavides, Carbajal and brother Fernando, joined with John Joseph Linn to fight Santa Anna's dictatorship. De León contributed livestock and equipment for the Texan resistance. In 1835, he joined the Benavides unit and fought under Stephen F. Austin during the two-month Siege of Béxar campaign to drive out Martín Perfecto de Cos.

== Louisiana exile ==
Although many Mexicans were opposed to Santa Anna's regime, they were not necessarily in favor of Texas becoming an independent state. On July 20, 1836, Brigadier General Thomas Jefferson Rusk ordered Mexican families in the Victoria area to be evacuated in an attempt to stem any assistance being given to Santa Anna. The Carbajal, Benavides and De León families left for New Orleans, forced to abandon their money and possessions.

== Death ==
In 1842, De León returned to Victoria to try to reclaim the family's property, and was murdered by persons unknown. He is buried at Evergreen Cemetery in Victoria, Texas. Recorded Texas Historic Landmark number 6544 placed at Evergreen Cemetery in 1972 acknowledges Silvestre De León's contribution to Texas.

== Personal life ==
Silvestre De León married Rosalie de la Garza. The couple had two sons, Martín and Francisco. Upon Silvestre's death, the sons were adopted by Silvestre's brother Fernando De León. On April 12, 1833, they received a 4,428-acre tract of land from the Mexican government. The town of Nursery, Texas was founded in 1884 on part of that land.
