= Patricia de la Garza De León =

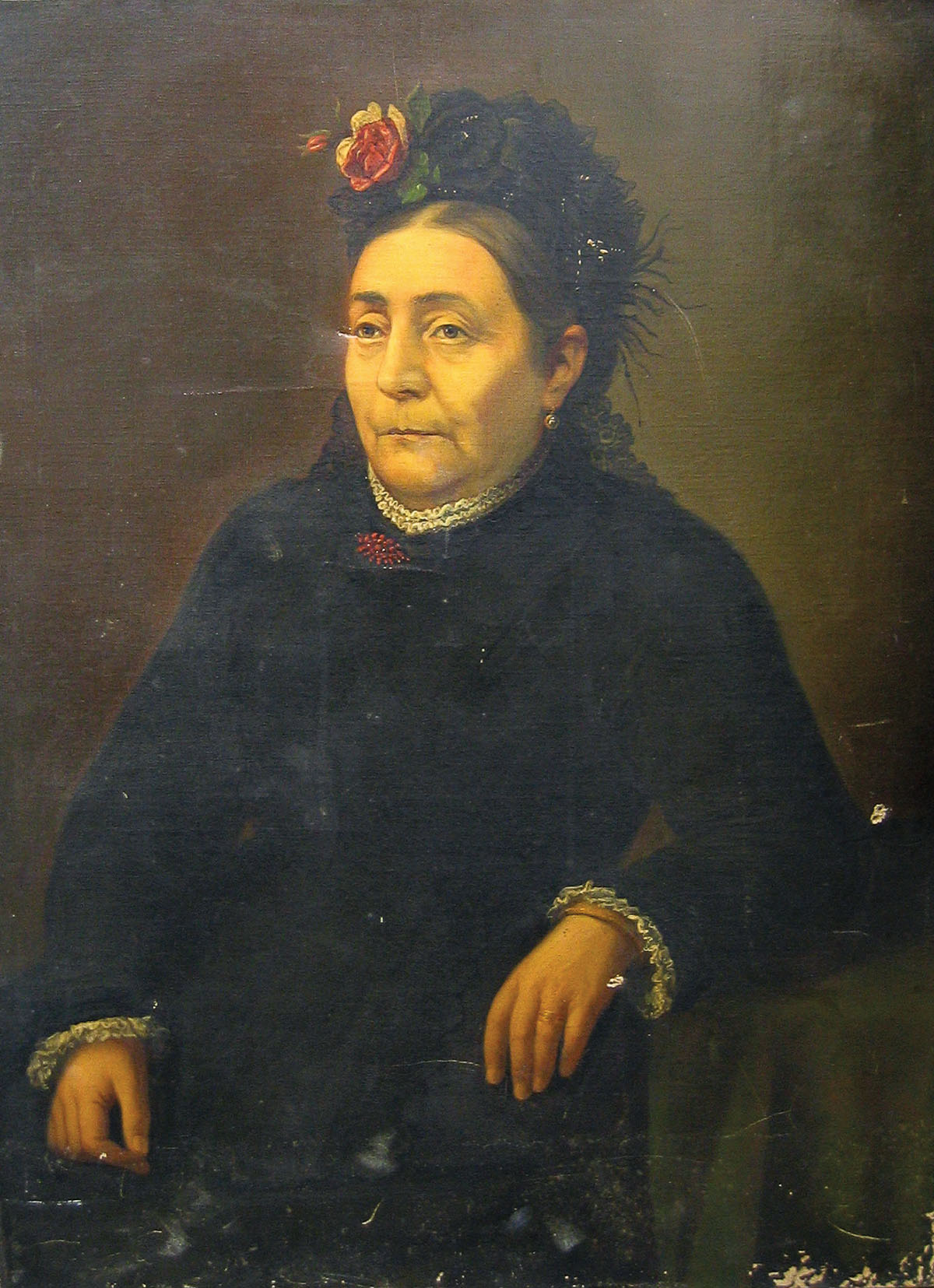
- Painting on display at Victoria Preservation
- Born: Patricia de la Garza; 1775; Soto la Marina, Nuevo Santander, New Spain
- Died: 1849 (aged 74); Victoria, Texas
- Resting place: Evergreen Cemetery; Victoria, Texas; 28°48′43″N 97°00′48″W
- Known for: Co-founder of De León's Colony
- Spouse: Martín De León
- Children: Fernando (1798); Candelaria (1800); Silvestre (1802); Guadalupe (1804); Félix (1806); Agapito (1808); María (1810); Refugio (1812); Agustina (1814); Francisca (1818)
- Father: Felipe de la Garza y Cisneros

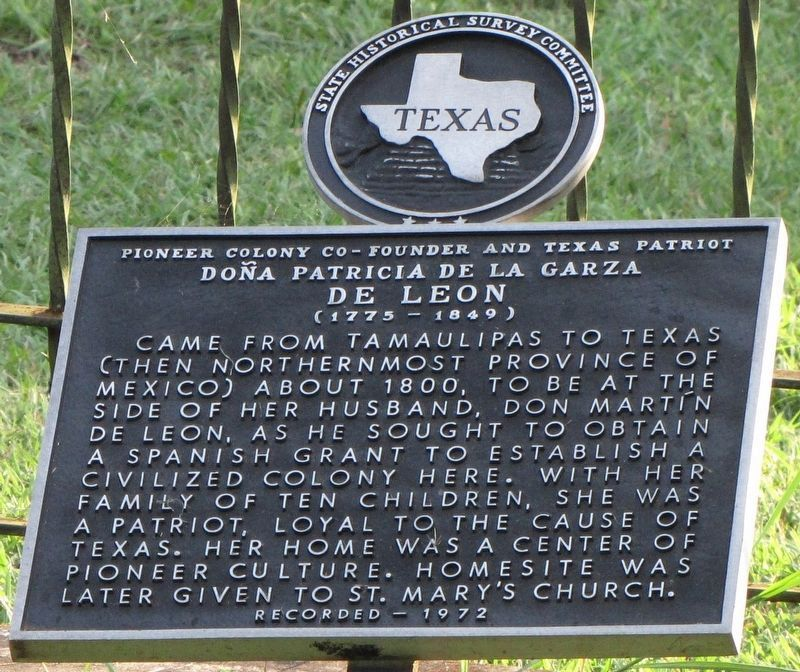
The historical marker for Patricia de la Garza

Patricia de la Garza De León (1775–1849) was the matriarch of one of the prominent founding families of early Texas. Doña Patricia raised ten children, some of whom helped change the course of history. At age 49, she uprooted her life in 1824 to help her husband Martín De León establish the predominantly Mexican De León's Colony.

She contributed her inherited assets to the founding of the colony, and helped establish a school and a church. From the onset, she worked to instill a sense of Mexican and Spanish culture in the colony.

After the death of her husband, Doña Patricia assumed the role of head of the family. Recorded Texas Historic Landmark number 6539 placed at Evergreen Cemetery in 1972 acknowledges Patricia de la Garza De León's contribution to Texas. Recorded Texas Historic Landmark number 6543 placed at Church and Bridge Streets in 1936 denotes the home of Patricia de la Garza De León and Don Martin De León's home in Victoria.

== Early life ==
Doña Patricia de la Garza De León was born in 1775 in Soto la Marina, Tamaulipas, Mexico, to a wealthy family headed by her father Felipe de la Garza.

== Marriage and children ==
In 1795, she married Martín De León and settled with him at his ranch in Cruillas. Martín sold wild mustangs, mules and cattle in New Orleans. The couple's first child Fernando was born at the Cruillas ranch in 1798.

The couple moved their base of ranching operations in 1799 to San Patricio County, Texas, where three more children were born. Daughter Candelaria was born in 1800, son Silvestre in 1802, and daughter Guadalupe in 1804.

The Spanish government granted the family land on the east bank of the Aransas River, north of Corpus Christi in 1805. Son Félix was born there in 1806 and son Agapito in 1808. While at this location in 1807, Martín De León registered the family's cattle brand, the first registered brand in what would become Texas.

The family moved to south of the Nueces River in 1810, where daughter María de Jesús (María) was born that year. Indian depredations increased as the Spanish government withdrew troops. The family moved northward to just outside San Antonio where three daughters were born. María del Refugio (Refugio) arrived in 1812, Agustina in 1814 and Francisca in 1818.

== Establishing Victoria, Texas ==
On April 13, 1824, the provisional Mexican government granted Martín De León an empresario contract to settle forty-one Mexican families on the lower Guadalupe and Lavaca rivers. At age 49, with her four adult children and six minor children, Patricia de la Garza De León uprooted her life to become her husband's partner in the founding of De León's Colony. She gave her inheritance of $9,800, plus another $300 valuation of cows, horses, and mules, in order to help get the colonization off the ground.

At Victoria, Doña Patricia transplanted cultural traditions of Mexico and Spain to the community. The De León family lived in a log home with a dirt floor. Nevertheless, Doña Patricia filled it with imported furniture provided to her from her family in Mexico. The family kept domestic servants, and the home became a community gathering place. She discouraged her children from using guns, for fear they would be perceived as bandits. She sent her children and grandchildren to school in Mexico and Spain. When José María Jesús Carbajal platted the town, she made sure land was set aside for a school and a church. Her donation of $500 in gold helped to build and furnish the church.

== Death of Martin De León ==
Martín De León died of cholera in 1833, and left an estate worth $500,000. Fernando took over the colony responsibilities of his father. Doña Patricia managed the family assets and continued her civic work.

== Exile ==
The De León extended family, like many Mexicans, were opposed to the regime of Antonio López de Santa Anna. Texas independence was a separate issue. As the issue did with other Mexicans living in Texas, it divided the De León extended family, some of whom helped change the course of history in both Texas and Mexico. Divided loyalties among the Mexicans made them subject to suspicion and prejudice from the new Republic of Texas government and military establishment.

Candelaria's husband José Miguel Aldrete was 1835 state land commissioner of Coahuila y Tejas. Aldrete joined several Texas insurgent groups to resist Santa Anna.

Refugia married José María Jesús Carbajal in 1832. Initially, he teamed up with Fernando De León and Peter Kerr, to trade livestock for munitions to help his old friend and mentor Stephen F. Austin. Carbajal, however, felt his loyalties lay with the Mexican people, not the Texas cause. He moved across the Rio Grande and waged guerilla warfare in Mexico against Santa Anna's political machine. Doña Patricia loaned Carbajal $6,000 for his cause. Fernando later became aide-de-camp to provisional Texas governor James W. Robinson.

Maria had one daughter with her husband Mexican politician and military officer Rafael Manchola. He died of cholera in 1832 or 1833.

Augustina married Plácido Benavides, who opposed Santa Anna's dictatorship, but felt Texas should remain part of Mexico. Benavides led a unit of Tejano fighters at the Battle of Goliad. He was recruited by Stephen F. Austin for the 1835 Siege of Béxar to drive Martín Perfecto de Cos out of Texas. Silvestre fought beside his brother-in-law Plácido at the Siege of Béxar. Benavides earned himself the sobriquet of the "Texas Paul Revere" for his 1836 journey from San Patricio to Goliad to Victoria, warning residents of the approaching Mexican army.

Doña Patricia's youngest son Agapito was murdered in 1836. In 1972, Recorded Texas Historic Landmark number 6538 was designated in recognition of Agapito De León.

On July 20, 1836, Brigadier General Thomas Jefferson Rusk ordered Mexican families in the Victoria area to be evacuated in an attempt to stem any assistance being given to Santa Anna. The Carbajal, Benavides and De León families left for New Orleans, forced to abandon their money and possessions. In Louisiana, they lived in poverty, and then moved back with Doña Patricia's family in Soto la Marina. She was able to sell 25,000 acres of land near Garcitias Creek for $10,000 in 1837.

Silvestre De León returned to Victoria in 1842 to try and reclaim the family's property, and was murdered by persons unknown.

Doña Patricia returned to Texas in 1844, only to find her assets had been redistributed among new settlers. In the new climate, she had lost her social standing in the community. She devoted the rest of her life in service to the local Catholic church.

== Death ==
Doña Patricia died in 1849, and is buried at Evergreen Cemetery in Victoria, Texas. Before her death, she had donated the original De León homestead to the Catholic Church. She also donated altar vessels and a gold monstrance. Saint Mary's Catholic Church occupies the site of the De León homestead.

Recorded Texas Historic Landmark number 6539 placed at Evergreen Cemetery in 1972 acknowledges Patricia de la Garza De León's contribution to Texas. Recorded Texas Historic Landmark number 6543 placed at Church and Bridge Streets in 1936 denotes the home of Patricia de la Garza De León and Don Martin De León's home in Victoria.
