= José María Jesús Carbajal =

Mexican freedom fighter (1809–1874)

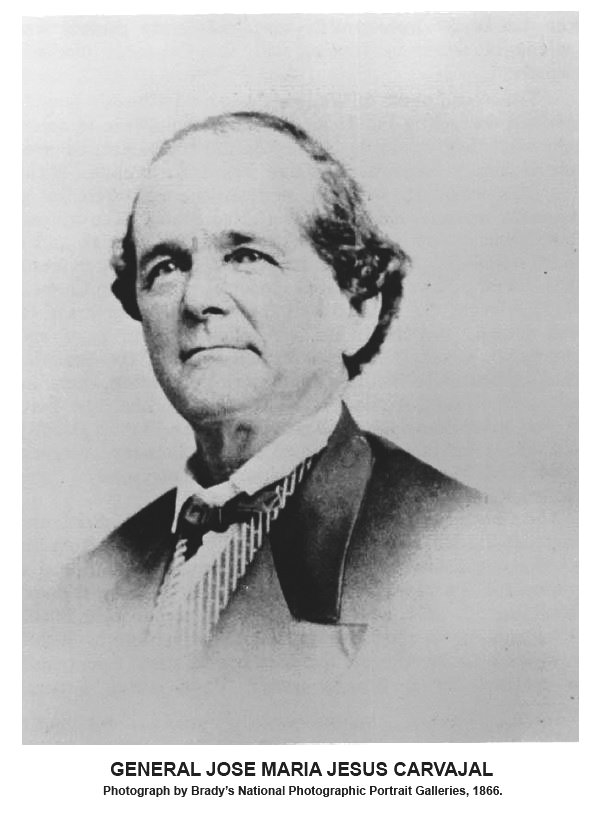
- Photograph of General Jose Maria Jesus Carvajal made by Matthew Brady in 1866.

Governor of Tamaulipas
- In office 4 March 1866 – 20 August 1866
- Preceded by: Juan Nepomuceno Cortina
- Succeeded by: Servando Canales Molano
- In office 26 September 1864 – 15 April 1865
- Preceded by: Juan Nepomuceno Cortina
- Succeeded by: Francisco de León

Personal details
- Born: 1809 San Fernando de Béjar, Viceroyalty of New Spain (now San Antonio, Texas, U.S.)
- Died: 1874 (aged 64–65) Soto la Marina, Tamaulipas, Mexico
- Spouse: María del Refugia De León Garza
- Children: Antonio; José María Jr. Cresenciano
- Parent(s): José Antonio Carbajal Peña; María Gertrudis Sánchez Soto
- Occupation: Surveyor; Politician

Military service
- Allegiance: Rio Grande (Federalist Wars); Mexico
- Branch/service: Mexican Army
- Rank: General
- Battles/wars: Mexican Federalist Wars; Rio Grande Rebellion; Mexican–American War; Reform War; Second Franco–Mexican War

José María Jesús Carbajal (also spelled Carvajal, Caravajal, Carabajal, and Carbahal; 1809 –1874) was a Mexican-Tejano surveyor, politician and military leader. A controversial borderlands figure, Carbajal served as a conscientious objector during the Texas Revolution, refusing to take up arms directly against fellow Mexicans. He later engaged in federalist revolts, commanded irregular Mexican forces in the Mexican–American War, led border expeditions in the 1850s, and actively supported Benito Juárez’s liberal government during the Reform War and the Second French intervention, serving as military commandant and governor of Tamaulipas.

== Early life ==
=== Birth and background, Stephen F. Austin ===
José María Jesús Carbajal was born one of eleven children in 1809 in the villa of San Fernando de Béxar, which would later become the American city of San Antonio, Texas, to soldier José Antonio Carbajal Peña and his wife María Gertrudis Sánchez Soto. The family was directly descended from Jeronimo Carbajal, who came to San Antonio with other Canary Islands settlers in the 18th century; among his ancestors were conquistador Luis de Carvajal y de la Cueva and Francisco de Carvajal. José Antonio died while José María was a young child, leaving his widow and eleven children to survive in a community that was beginning to receive Anglo settlers. Among the Anglos the family befriended was Stephen F. Austin, who took young José María under his mentorship.

=== Kentucky, Virginia, return to Texas ===
Austin obtained parental permission for young Carbajal to travel to Frankfort, Kentucky in 1823 with merchant Littleberry Hawkins and learn the tanning trade from Hawkins' brother-in-law Blanchard. Two years later, Carbajal moved to Lexington to train under a saddle maker by the name of Peter Hedenbergh. Carbajal converted from Catholicism to Protestantism in 1826 and was baptized in the Reformed Baptist Church of Lexington. It was at this church that Carbajal heard theologian Alexander Campbell of Bethany, Virginia. Campbell enrolled Carbajal in Bethany College, and Carbajal roomed in the Campbell home for the next two years.

Carbajal returned to Texas in 1830 and requested Austin's assistance in marketing bibles that had been translated into Spanish by the Bishop of Madrid. The price of the bibles was to be on a sliding scale, depending on an individual's ability to pay. It is unknown whether Austin involved himself with the Bible sales. Austin did, however, have such sufficient faith in Carbajal's character and abilities by 1832 that Austin detailed him to New Orleans on a personal issue, to meet with Rezin Bowie and collect a debt owed to Austin by the Bowie family.

== Political beginnings ==
=== Surveyor ===
Carbajal decided upon the profession of a surveyor, completing his studies in his chosen field by 1831. His bi-lingual abilities gave him an advantage when communicating to Anglo settlers the complex legal documents written in Spanish.

Stephen F. Austin sponsored him in obtaining employment as the official surveyor for empresario Martín De León and his wife Patricia de la Garza De León to plat the town of Victoria, Texas. The market square he originally laid out is now known as DeLeon Plaza and Bandstand. Carbajal married the De Leon daughter María del Refugia De León Garza and became one of the colonists who settled in the De Leon land grant.

The Law of April 6, 1830 of Mexico had been passed to stop the tide of Anglo immigration into the country, hoping to safeguard against the annexation of Texas by the United States. The state government of Coahuila y Tejas sent Carbajal and Jose Francisco Madero to conduct land grant surveys in East Texas in January 1831, for settlers who had been residing outside the authority of any other empresario grants prior to 1828. A confrontation about the granting of the titles arose between Madero and Mexican Colonel Juan Davis Bradburn, who was the military governor over Galveston Bay. After correspondence disputing Madero's authority to make the surveys, and Madero's faux pas of not making a courtesy call to discuss the issue, Bradburn issued a directive on February 13, instructing Madero to meet with him. When Madero ignored that order, Bradburn immediately arrested both Madero and Carbajal. The two remained incarcerated for ten days. They were released, pending Bradburn's receiving further direction from Mexico City. Madero and Carbajal resumed their surveying, filing sixty completed land titles. On April 12, the government in Saltillo sent Madero orders to stop surveying in Bradburn's territory, but the work had already been completed by that date.

=== Coahuila y Tejas ===
Carbajal, aided by influence from Stephen F. Austin, threw his energies into politics. In May 1831, Carbajal became part of an elected caucus formed to redress the Mexican government over Bradburn's actions. Six months later in November, Carbajal was appointed to the San Felipe local government. In 1832, Carbajal had a seat on the Nacogdoches town council. He was also instrumental in assisting the town of Liberty with setting up its own town council.

Antonio López de Santa Anna was elected President of Mexico on April 1, 1833, after effecting the ouster and exile of President Anastasio Bustamante. Santa Anna revoked the 1824 Constitution of Mexico and replaced its Federalist form of government with a Centralist regime to further his military dictatorship. He appointed his brother-in-law Martín Perfecto de Cos as commandant-general northeast of Saltillo.

Carbajal had been ad interim secretary for the ayuntamiento of Bexar. In the spring of 1835, he was elected deputy to the legislature of Coahuila y Texas, as one of Bexar's pro-immigration liberals. In March, Carbajal was elected secretary and authorized to publish the laws and decrees of the state in English and Spanish. Carbajal, along with James Grant and John Marie Durst of Nacogdoches were on the Committee of Civic Militia and Colonization. Carbajal met with Samuel May Williams, whom he had known through Stephen F. Austin. Williams wanted to enlist Carbajal's help in passage of a new law he planned to introduce.

The Four Hundred League Law, was first proposed as Decree 278 and passed April 19, 1834. It authorized the governor to sell up to four hundred leagues (1.5 million acres) in Texas, in order to generate income for the state treasury for the purpose of a volunteer militia to protect the citizenry specifically against Indian attacks. Samuel May Williams and John Durst introduced Decree 293, which passed on March 14, 1835, and was similar to Decree 278. However, Decree 293 did not limit the funding to protection against Indian attacks. 293 also lifted restrictions for the method of selling the four hundred leagues of land. On March 16, Williams, Durst and Grant proposed to buy the four hundred leagues themselves, before the land went on sale to the public. Grant also gave Williams his power of attorney in the sales. The appearance of conflict of interest angered many.

General Cos declared the new law illegal. On March 31, 1835, the Central Government passed the Federal Militia Reduction Act 1835. On April 28, 1835, federal legislation in Mexico invalidated the Four Hundred League Law. The state legislature challenged the federal invalidation, and the two entities found themselves entangled. General Cos sent troops to shut down the legislature, and ordered the arrest of all who voted for the Four Hundred League Law.

Colonel Domingo Ugartechea, as principal commandant of Coahuila y Texas, ordered Carbajal arrested, but soldiers were unsuccessful in their attempts at doing so when they arrived in Victoria. Upon orders from Victoria's alcalde, who happened to be Carbajal's brother-in-law Plácido Benavides, the local Victoria militia blocked the soldiers from entry into Victoria, and the soldiers retreated.

Carbajal had gone into hiding. He described himself as a "true Mexican" who was not in opposition to Mexico, but rather Santa Anna and the Centralist regime he had installed.

=== Texas war of independence ===
In 1835, Stephen F. Austin issued an appeal for arms to equip the Texans in the war against Santa Anna. Carbajal responded to his old mentor's appeal by teaming up with his brother-in-law Fernando De León, and with Peter Kerr. The trio rounded up horses and mules, and herded them aboard the Hannah Elizabeth to be traded for munitions in New Orleans. During a pursuit by the Mexican warship Bravo on the return trip with the purchased equipment, the crew was forced to dump the cargo into the Gulf of Mexico. The crew of the Bravo boarded the Hannah Elizabeth, taking several prisoners. Carbajal and De León were incarcerated at Brazos Santiago, but Kerr was set free. Fernando De León was released with payment of a bribe. Carbajal was transferred to Matamoros, Tamaulipas, with an intended transfer for imprisonment at San Juan de Ulloa. Plácido Benavides bribed the guards at Matamoros to effect an escape for Carbajal, who afterwards returned to Victoria. The United States government took public credit for release of all prisoners.

During the Texas War of Independence many Mexicans were opposed to Santa Anna's regime but refused to take up arms against their own people. Carbajal counted himself among those conscientious objectors. Mexicans who refused to take up arms were suspected as sympathizers, if not active allies, of the Santa Anna regime, and they were treated accordingly. Brigadier General Thomas Jefferson Rusk confiscated the homes of those who wished to remain neutral in the war. In July 1836, Rusk ordered the Carbajal, Benavides and De Leon families of Victoria escorted off their own land. The two families left for New Orleans. Having been stripped of their wealth and everything they owned, they resorted to manual labor to survive in New Orleans. Carbajal renounced his ties to the new Republic of Texas.

In 1842, Carbajal's brother-in-law Silvestre De León returned to Victoria, and was murdered.

== Freedom fighter and guerrilla warfare ==
=== Federalist wars of Mexico, Republic of the Rio Grande ===
After Santa Anna lost Texas, Anastasio Bustamante returned from exile and in 1837 once again became President of Mexico. The people of Mexico blamed Santa Anna's Centralist regime for the loss of Texas. They saw Bustamante as his puppet and wanted a return to the Federalist form of government. Carbajal and Antonio Canales Rosillo recruited insurgents to resist the Centralist troops, and to try to establish a breakaway republic. During one of the skirmishes, Carbajal was struck by a musket ball and permanently lost the use of his left arm.

=== Mexican–American War ===
The 1845 annexation of Texas by the United States was the opening salvo of the Mexican–American War. Mexico had seen the government of the Republic of Texas as illegitimate and hoped for a return of Texas to Mexico. Complicating the annexation issue was the disputed area of the Nueces Strip.

Seeing an opportunity to revive the Federalist cause, Canales Rosillo sent a letter to Zachary Taylor on January 29, 1846, requesting a meeting with either himself or Carbajal, to discuss United States aid in ousting the Centralist government. During a meeting with Carbajal, Taylor requested Carbajal submit a written proposal. Carbajal's written proposal detailed their request for money, supplies, and ammunition to support their rebellion. Additionally, they wanted Taylor's permission to recruit several thousand volunteers from the United States. In return, the Federalists only offered to retain the status quo situation of the Nueces Strip being open for negotiation. Taylor forwarded the request to Secretary of War William L. Marcy, who declined the request. Marcy did, however, instruct Taylor that if any Mexicans wanted to cross the border to enlist in the United States military, Taylor was to welcome them.

Carbajal and Canales Rosillo threw their loyalties behind the Centralist government, conducting guerilla warfare in the border regions against the United States.

The war came to an end in 1848 with the signing of the Treaty of Guadalupe Hidalgo.

=== The Merchants War ===
Carbajal sought to establish a Federalist state in 1851, the Republic of Sierra Madre. Mexican import tariffs and the issue of runaway slaves from Texas became facilitating factors. Abolitionists in Texas had developed an underground to assist runaway slaves to escape to freedom in the Mexican border area. Out of this situation grew bounty hunters who were dedicated to recovering runaway slaves.

The mercantile smuggling industry had developed in the border areas, due to Mexico's ban of some imported goods, and exorbitant import duty on the goods it did allow. The ensuing rebellion over the import tariffs came to be known as the Merchants War. The initial seed money for Carbajal's army was raised in June 1851 through the sale of Mexican land grants to disgruntled merchants in Texas. An additional $6,000 came from an earlier loan that Carbajal's mother-in-law Patricia de la Garza De León had advanced him before her 1849 death. Carbajal recruited his troops from within Texas, some of whom joined in part because he had promised them recovery of the runaways. Among the recruits were thirty Texas Rangers led by Colonel John S. Ford.

In 1851, Carbajal led an incursion of filibuster troops from Texas into Mexico, and on September 19 attacked Camargo. The captured Mexican troops signed a surrender agreement. Carbajal immediately slashed the Camargo tariff rates for goods coming into Mexico, resulting in an immediate increase of goods, and filling the coffers of the Camargo customs house. His action was countered by Mexican General Francisco Avalos, who announced a tariff cut for any goods entering Mexico through Matamoros. On October 6, 1851, Carbajal's troops captured Reynosa. On October 20, 1851, Carbajal's troops began their ten-day attack on Matamoros. Avalos and reinforcements put up a fierce resistance. On October 30, Carbajal ordered his troops to retreat.

On November 24, 1851, Carbajal's troops engaged Centralist troops in Cerralvo, and lay siege to the town. On November 27, Carbajal received word that a thousand Centralist reinforcements were about to enter Cerralvo. Carbajal ordered his troops to retreat. In February 1852, the Carbajal troops again advanced on Camargo. This time they were beaten back by National Guard troops from Ciudad Victoria, under the command of Antonio Canales Rosillo.

A grand jury in Brownsville, Texas issued an indictment in January 1852 against Carbajal and others, for violation of the Neutrality Act of 1818. A change of venue to Galveston was granted. The charges were dismissed on January 2, 1854, due to technicalities on the qualifications of the original grand jurors who brought the indictment. During the Texas state fair held in Corpus Christi in May 1852, Carbajal was a featured speaker, raising funds and support for his Federalist cause.

Former members of Carbajal's group, led by Major Alfred Norton and A.J. Mason, conducted an armed raid in Carbajal's name on Reynosa on March 25, 1853. General William S. Harney had Carbajal and some of his associates arrested and indicted on March 31 by U.S. District Attorney William Pitt Ballinger. Nolle prosequi (unwilling to pursue) was entered in the case in June 1855.

=== Castle Carbajal, Piedras Negras ===
Prior to the Mexican–American War, Carbajal had moved to Camargo Municipality, Tamaulipas, where he taught school and did some surveying work. At the end of the war, Carbajal returned to Camargo and built a grand home that became known as Carbajal's Castle. By 1855, Carbajal had moved his family to Piedras Negras.

In October 1855, Texas Ranger James Hugh Callahan, retreating from a skirmish with Seminole Indians, burned Piedras Negras to the ground. Carbajal filed a $21,792 damage claim with the United States government, but his claim was denied. In 1856, in the midst of a dispute between Santiago Vidaurri and Camargo over customs receipts, Carbajal's castle was destroyed.

=== Reform war ===
Santa Anna returned to power in 1853. In order to raise money to build up the Mexican army, he made a $10 million deal in 1854 to sell to the United States 29,640-square-mile (76,800 km^{2}) of Mexico that are now part of Arizona and New Mexico. The sale of Mexican lands to the United States was a tipping point that helped foster the Plan of Ayutla, removing Santa Anna from office once again in 1855. This set the stage for a tug of war between conservatives and liberals in Mexico. Carbajal sided with Minister of Justice Benito Juárez, who became president of Mexico in 1858.

General David E. Twiggs abandoned Fort Brown in 1859. On September 28, Juan Cortina captured Brownsville, Texas, to exact revenge on persons he considered his enemies. Two days later, Carbajal led a group of men who persuaded Cortina to depart. When Brownsville formed its own militia, Carbajal loaned the city twenty-five muskets from the National Guard. Cortina continued to cause problems in Mexico, and Carbajal requested the intervention of assistance from the United States.

The contested 1861 election for the seat of governor of Tamaulipas caused Carbajal as head of the Rojas Party, to invade Matamoros. With no clear victory in Carbajal's incursion, Benito Juarez declared martial law in Tamaulipas and named Santiago Vidaurri as state military commander. Vidaurri ordered Colonel Julian Quiroga into Matamoros to bring an end to the conflict. Carbajal escaped into Texas. Brigadier General Henry McCulloch ordered Colonel John S. Ford to arrest Carbajal and turn him over to Quiroga. Ford instead told Carbajal of the arrest warrant, and allowed Carbajal to escape. McCullouch then relieved Ford of his command.

Carbajal was appointed military governor of Tamaulipas in 1864.

=== French incursion ===
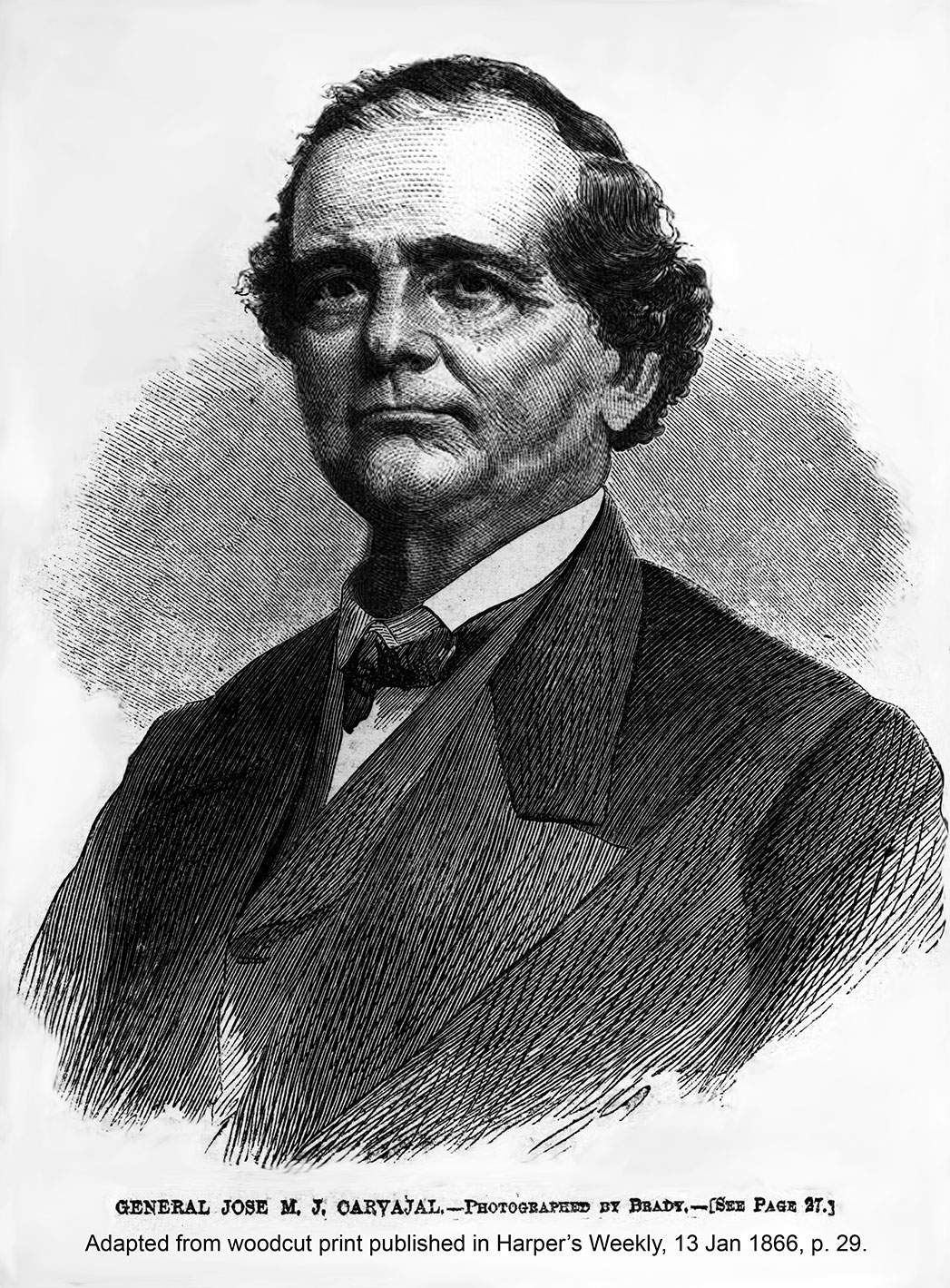
1866 portrait of Mexican General Carvajal; woodcut print made from a Matthew Brady photo.

The Reform War drove the Juarez government of Mexico into debt with four powerful countries: France, England, the United States and Spain. In January 1862, France, Great Britain and Spain had taken over the customs house in Veracruz to recoup some of the monies owed them. Great Britain and Spain eventually withdrew. Napoleon III planned an invasion to acquire Mexico for France.

Juarez enlisted Carbajal as general of the Liberal forces. On November 12, 1864, Juarez authorized Carbajal to enlist upwards of ten thousand foreign citizens. Juan Cortina had been in control of Matamoros, and surrendered the city to the French, under the control of Tomas Mejia. President Abraham Lincoln and Secretary of War Edwin M. Stanton sent General Lew Wallace on a covert operation to assist Carbajal in procurement of arms and ammunition. In 1866, Napoleon III withdrew his troops from Mexico. Mejia surrendered Matamoros to Carbajal, who was by then Governor and Military Commandant of Tamaulipas. Seizures of churches from French clerics, and forced loans from French-leaning merchants were part of Carbajal's operations. Sebastián Lerdo de Tejada appointed Santiago Tapia to replace Carbajal. The military garrison of Matamoros also rebelled against Carbajal.

== Personal life and final years ==
When María del Refugia De León Garza accepted Carbajal's marriage proposal, her mother Patricia de la Garza De León had strong objections to her Catholic daughter marrying a Protestant. In spite of that issue, the couple tied the knot in 1832. Their first son Antonio was born in 1833. José María Jr. was born in 1834. The year of son Cresenciano's birth is unknown, but his death is listed as 1846. During the Civil War, Carbajal enrolled his two surviving sons in Bethany College in West Virginia, where they lived with Alexander Campbell. Carbajal retired in 1870 to his ranch in Mexico. He died in Soto la Marina, Tamaulipas in 1874, where he had been living for two years.
