= José Francisco Madero =

Mexican surveyor and land commissioner

José Francisco Madero Gaxiola y San Martín (died 1833) was a Mexican surveyor and land commissioner. He was the father of Evaristo Madero Elizondo and great-grandfather of Francisco I. Madero, leader of the Mexican Revolution and president of Mexico.

He was also the founder of Liberty, Texas, when Texas was still a part of Mexico.

He died during a cholera epidemic in the Mexican state of Coahuila on September 26, 1833.

== See also ==
- José María Jesús Carbajal Helped Madero survey East Texas
