= General Colonization Law =

Mexican law on immigration (1824)

The Colonization Law of August 18, 1824 was a Mexican statute allowing foreigners to immigrate to the country.

== Background ==
Under Spanish rule, New Spain was populated almost solely with native peoples or Spanish settlers. Foreign immigration was forbidden for much of the country. Few settlers chose to journey to the economically stagnant northern frontier, leaving provinces like Spanish Texas and Alta California chronically underpopulated. Despite multiple efforts to increase the population along the frontier, by 1821 there were only 3,200 settlers in Alta California, and only 2,500 in Texas.

In 1819, after the United States abandoned its claims to Texas, Spain implemented a new immigration policy. In January 1821, Spanish authorities gave Moses Austin, a former Spanish subject from Louisiana, a land grant and permission to bring families from Louisiana to Texas. Austin died before bringing any families. Several months later, at the urging of Mexican delegates, the Spanish Cortes granted permission for foreigners to live on public lands along the northern frontier of the colony. The lack of a formal policy had not stopped many immigrants – a number of people had left the United States to settle in the Mexican northern provinces. Local officials were not eager to expel potentially productive settlers who could help improve the colonies, and the squatters were generally left alone.

Shortly thereafter, Mexico gained independence from Spain. The new country was sparsely populated. Approximately 6.2 million people lived in an area that spanned from what is now the United States state of Oregon to what is now Guatemala. Almost 10% of the population – primarily young men – had been killed during the Mexican War of Independence, leaving the young nation with a shortage of laborers.

Many Mexicans believed that a new method for increasing population along the frontiers was necessary. The sparse settlements were vulnerable to attacks from native tribes and for encroachment by foreign powers. The most vulnerable was Texas; early in 1821 the town of Goliad had been captured by American filibusters as part of the Long Expedition. By 1823, approximately 3,000 Americans from the United States were living illegally in Texas. The roughly 200 Mexican troops garrisoned in the province were unable to effectively patrol the borders to keep out additional squatters, nor were they powerful enough to evict the squatters already there. Proponents of immigration reform argued that legalizing these settlers would help to turn their loyalty towards Mexico.

Some believed that their own countrymen were not suitable colonists, and most agreed that the system of missions and presidios did not work well for settling the frontiers. Mexican liberals argued in favor of allowing foreigners to immigrate. This would satisfy multiple objectives, including boosting economic growth, increasing the size of the military, and bringing new capital and skills into the country to replace those lost during the expulsion of many Spaniards. Proponents of immigration pointed to the United States' population growth, attributed largely to immigration. Opponents cautioned that there may be difficulties in attracting settlers and later assimilating them to Mexican mores.

Emperor Agustin I of Mexico made colonization a priority for his administration. He appointed a government commission, headed by Juan Francisco Azcárate y Ledesma, to recommend a plan. The commission recommended following the precedent of the earlier Spanish law and allowing foreign settlers to help colonize Coahuila, Nuevo Santander, Baja California, Alta California, New Mexico, and Texas. The proposal suggested that Europeans and American citizens be recruited for most of the states and provinces, although for California they recommended sending Mexican convicts and recruiting Chinese settlers.

Iturbide's primary concern was stabilizing the new government, and the Imperial Colonization Law was not signed until February 18, 1823. Iturbide was overthrown a month later, and the law was annulled shortly thereafter. During its brief existence, a few land grants were awarded to empresarios who agreed to settle a number of families. One went to Stephen F. Austin, son of Moses Austin, and another to Martin de Leon.

== Details ==
On August 18, 1824, the new Mexican government passed the General Colonization Law. This statute allowed foreigners to gain title to land that was at least 20 leagues from the border of another country or at least 10 leagues of the coast. Settlers would be exempt from taxes for ten years.

Most individuals were restricted to a total of 11 square leagues of land (71.5 square miles (185 km^{2})). Of them, 6 square leagues could be of quality for grazing animals, 1 square league could be irrigable land, and 4 square leagues could be non-irrigable. New towns would be given an additional 4 leagues of land for public use. Empresarios were granted more personal land. For every 100 families settled, the empresario could receive 5 sitios of grazing land and 5 labores of farmland.

The law did not require settlers to be Mexican citizens although citizens were given preference in land grants, and it did not require that the settlers convert to Catholicism. However, federal laws prohibited all religions except Catholicism.

Land would be granted from available public land. Spanish custom had allowed residents continuing use of their land as long as there was no challenge to ownership. The new law allowed residents, including Christianized natives, to claim title to any land they inhabited, cultivated, or used for grazing.

Each state was to have administrators to survey land, confirm land titles, and settle disputes. Missionaries were tasked with helping the native tribes to understand the process. Governors were to organize and to preside over land commissions to review and to finalize the land titles.

== Results and modifications ==
The process for gaining an official land title was expensive and time-consuming, and many residents did not have their land surveyed or complete the application process. Empresarios often claimed land that was already inhabited by people who had not sought legal protection forcing the existing residents from their homes. Many of the traditional hunting grounds of the native tribes were considered public land and given to empresarios to settle foreigners.

Many Americans immigrated to Mexico, where land was cheaper. By 1830, Texas had a population of 7,000 foreign-born residents, with only 3,000 Mexican nationals.

The new population was not fully assimilated. Many immigrants settled in the eastern part of Texas and were isolated from the established Mexican towns. The attitudes of the immigrants culminated in the Fredonian Rebellion's failed secession attempt in 1827, which alarmed Mexican officials.

The Law of April 6, 1830 rescinded all empresario contracts that had not been completed, and it prohibited Americans from settling in any Mexican territory adjacent to the United States. Secretary of State Lucas Alamán, who wrote the 1830 law, stated, "Texas will be lost for this Republic if adequate measures to save it are not taken.... Where others send invading armies... [the Americans] send their colonists."

In 1836, federal officials rescinded the provision allowing governors to preside over land commissions. Although most governors were honest, in Arizona and California some were land speculators who seized land illegally and gave it to their friends and relatives. The updated rules forbade anyone who was not a federal official from issuing the patent.

== See also ==
- Law of April 6, 1830
- Immigration to Mexico
- Illegal immigration to Mexico

== Sources ==
- Menchaca, Martha (2001), Recovering History, Constructing Race: The Indian, Black, and White Roots of Mexican Americans, The Joe R. and Teresa Lozano Long Series in Latin American and Latino Art and Culture, Austin, Texas: University of Texas Press, ISBN 0-292-75253-9
- Weber, David J. (1982), The Mexican frontier, 1821-1846: the American Southwest under Mexico, University of New Mexico Press, ISBN 978-0-8263-0603-6
