= Martín De León =

Rancher and wealthy Mexican empresario

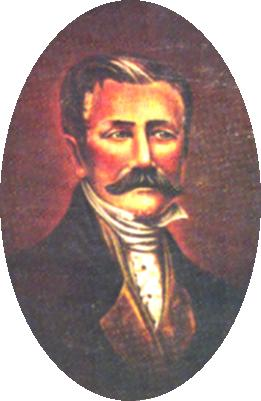
- Born: Martín de León y Galván; 1765; Nuevo Santander, New Spain (now Tamaulipas, Mexico)
- Died: 1833 (aged 68); Victoria, Coahuila y Tejas, First Mexican Republic
- Resting place: Evergreen Cemetery; Victoria, Texas; 28°48′43″N 97°00′48″W
- Known for: Empresario founded De León's Colony
- Spouse: Patricia de la Garza
- Children: Fernando (1798); Candelaria (1800); Silvestre (1802); Guadalupe (1804); Félix (1806); Agapito (1808); María (1810); Refugio (1812); Agustina (1814); Francisca (1818)
- Parent(s): José Bernardo de León y García; María Antonia Galván y de las Rivas

Martín De León (1765–1833) was a rancher and wealthy Mexican empresario in Texas who was descended from Spanish aristocracy. He was the patriarch of one of the prominent founding families of early Texas. De León and his wife Patricia de la Garza established De León's Colony, the only predominantly Mexican colony in Texas. They founded the town of Villa de Nuestra Señora de Guadalupe Victoria Nombre de Jesús (now known as Victoria) on the Guadalupe River. The name referred both to the river and to Mexico's president Guadalupe Victoria.

De León was a merchant who originally supplied basic necessities to mine workers at Real de San Nicolás. In 1790 he joined the Fieles de Burgos regiment, where he was promoted to captain. The De León E–J (Espíritu de Jesús) cattle brand became the first registered brand in what was to become Texas. The extended De León family included politicians and freedom fighters who helped alter the course of history both in Texas and in Mexico. Recorded Texas Historic Landmark number 6542, placed at Evergreen Cemetery in 1936, acknowledges Don Martin de León's contribution to Texas. Recorded Texas Historic Landmark number 6543, placed at Church and Bridge Streets in 1936, denotes Don Martin de León's home in Victoria.

== Early life ==
Martín De León was born in 1765 in Burgos, Tamaulipas, Mexico to José Bernardo de León y García and María Antonia Galván y de las Rivas from Burgos, Spain who were wealthy and well-connected aristocratic immigrants. He first worked as a supplier of basic necessities to Real de San Nicolás mine workers. He joined the Fieles de Burgos regiment in 1790, being promoted to captain.

== De Leon's colony ==
De León and his wife Patricia de la Garza began ranching in Cruillas following their marriage.

In 1799, De León moved northward and established Rancho Chiltipiquin, a cattle ranch in the vicinity of San Patricio County, Texas. Their cattle brand, with a connected E and J (standing for Espíritu de Jesús), became the first registered cattle brand in what was to become Texas. The brand had been modeled after one used by the Jesuits, and brought from Spain when the De León family emigrated. Martín officially registered it in Texas under the family name in 1807.

De León's 1807 and 1809 petitions to act as an empresario for colonization in Texas were denied by the Spanish government. After Mexico gained its independence from Spain in 1821, colonization possibilities looked more favorable. The provisional Mexican government approved a contract on April 13, 1824 for De León to settle forty-one Mexican families on the lower Guadalupe and Lavaca rivers, in the vicinity of Coleto, Garcitas, Arenosa, and Zorillo (Placido) creeks. The settlement's original name was Villa de Nuestra Señora de Guadalupe Victoria Nombre de Jesús, for both the river and Mexico's president Guadalupe Victoria. It is now known as Victoria.

This was the only predominantly Mexican colony in Texas, where the eastern areas were settled primarily by immigrants from the United States. The Mexico legislature passed the General Colonization Law on August 18, and enacted on March 25, 1825, allowing foreigners to gain title to land that was not within 20 leagues of the border of another country or within 10 leagues of the coast.

== Family ==
In 1795, Martín De León married Patricia de la Garza. Her financial inheritance contributed to the foundation of De León's Colony. Upon her husband's death, de la Garza assumed the role of head of the De León family. She kept the family together during exile in Louisiana. After their return to Victoria, she became a leading figure who helped shape and nurture the community. Their extended family colonized Texas, and included politicians whose deeds affected the course of history both in Texas and in Mexico.

The couple had four sons: Fernando, Silvestre, Félix and Agapito. Fernando helped trade livestock for munitions to help Stephen F. Austin, and later became aide-de-camp to provisional Texas governor James W. Robinson. Silvestre fought beside his brother-in-law Plácido at the 1835 Siege of Béxar to drive Martín Perfecto de Cos out of Texas.

The couple also had six daughters, who were overshadowed by the men they married. Candelaria married José Miguel Aldrete, who was 1835 state land commissioner of Coahuila y Tejas. Aldrete joined several Texas insurgent groups to resist President Antonio López de Santa Anna. Guadalupe married Desiderio García, of whom nothing is known. María de Jesús (María) married politician Rafael Manchola, who was elected to the state legislature in 1830. María del Refugio (Refugio) married Mexican freedom fighter José María Jesús Carbajal, who waged guerrilla warfare in Mexico against López de Santa Anna's political machine. Agustina married Plácido Benavides, who opposed Santa Anna's dictatorship, but believed that Texas should remain part of Mexico. Benavides led a unit of Tejano fighters at the Battle of Goliad. He was recruited by Stephen F. Austin for the Battle of Bexar. Benavides became known as the "Texas Paul Revere" for his 1836 journey from San Patricio to Goliad to Victoria, warning residents of the approaching Mexican army. Francisca married Vicente Dosal, of whom nothing is known.

== Death and legacy ==
Martín De León died of cholera in 1833, a year of epidemics that swept North America along its waterways. His estate was worth $500,000. De León is buried at Evergreen Cemetery in Victoria, Texas.

Recorded Texas Historic Landmark number 6542 placed at Evergreen Cemetery in 1936 acknowledges Don Martin de León's contribution to Texas. Recorded Texas Historic Landmark number 6543 placed at Church and Bridge Streets in 1936 denotes Don Martin de León's home in Victoria.

== See also ==
- History of the Mexican-Americans in Texas
