= Peter Kerr (Texas settler) =

Peter Kerr (September 12, 1795–November 18, 1861), also known as Peter Carr, was one of the founders of Burnet, Texas, and a member of the Old Three Hundred, the original settlers in Stephen F. Austin's colony.

== Early life ==
Peter Kerr or Carr was born in Carlisle, Pennsylvania, on September 12, 1795.

Kerr and his partner, William Kerr, received title to a league of land now in Washington County, Texas, on August 10, 1824. At some point in 1824, he landed at Matagorda Bay and proceeded overland to Victoria, where he established a mercantile business. He was listed in the census of 1826 as a merchant with three servants. Soon thereafter his plans to marry a Spanish girl were thwarted when he was robbed on a trading expedition among the Indians further down the Texas coast. Her father broke the contract because the robbery left Kerr penniless.

Kerr obtained a charter ship, which was soon wrecked in a storm. Kerr received insurance money for his ship and bought a hack and a pair of horses, which were in turn wrecked the first time he put them into use. After a trip to Pennsylvania he returned to New Orleans, purchased a still, and put it on a ship to Texas. The ship sailed without him.

In 1835, Kerr and José María Jesús Carbajal drove a herd of horses to New Orleans and sold them in exchange for merchandise for the Texas trade and for arms and munitions for the Texas army. The provisions were loaded onto the ship the Hannah Elizabeth, which was captured by the Mexican Bravo. The William Robbins (later the Liberty), a Texas privateer, recaptured the Hannah Elizabeth and Kerr was able to redeem his property by paying half its worth.

On March 24, 1836, General Sam Houston ordered Kerr's arrest on charges of spreading false news and of having befriended the Mexicans. The charges resulted from Kerr's delivery of the news of James W. Fannin's defeat in the battle of Coleto. Although Kerr spoke the truth, Houston could take no chances of a panic among his men.

== Entrepreneur and Civic Leader ==
After the battle of San Jacinto, Houston appointed Kerr interpreter for the Texas army. The Fourth Congress of the new Republic of Texas granted Kerr 320 acres (129 ha) of land and twenty-four dollars for his services as interpreter. From 1846 to 1848 he was a justice of the peace in Travis County. In 1849 he leased part of the Hamilton league in Burnet County and obtained a contract with the government to furnish beef to Fort Croghan. Kerr obtained a deed from John Hamilton on October 27, 1851, for the entire league, minus 600 acres (2.4 km^{2}) on the west side, which Hamilton had sold earlier. Kerr then leased to the government all of the league west of Hamilton Creek, including the land where Fort Croghan was located. Under the provisions of the agreement, if the government gave up the lease, Kerr would receive title to all of the improvements that had been made on the land.

In 1852, Kerr began laying out the townsite of Hamilton (later Burnet) on the east side of Hamilton Creek and selling the lots. When the county was organized later that year, he donated ten lots for a courthouse square and 100 acres (0.40 km^{2}) east of town to the county in order to ensure that Hamilton would be chosen county seat. Kerr soon amassed a sizable fortune as a result of his land dealings and cattle enterprise. When the government abandoned Fort Croghan in December 1853, he sold 617 acres (2.50 km^{2}), including the Fort Croghan site, for $6,000. In a letter to his brother in Pennsylvania in 1858 he estimated his holdings at $50,000.

Kerr died on November 21, 1861, and was buried in an unmarked grave in the northwestern section of the Old Burnet Cemetery. Three days before his death he established a will leaving all of his property except his land and $23,499.99 in notes due him to his nephew, William S. Carothers. The land was to be sold after ten years to establish Peter Kerr College at Burnet. Carothers contested the will and had it annulled. The city of Burnet received two acres (eight thousand m²) for a public school.
