= Coahuila y Tejas =

1824–1835 state of Mexico

Coordinates: 28°50′N 99°30′W

Estado Libre y Soberano de Coahuila y Tejas Coahuila y Tejas
- State of Mexico
- 1824–1835
- Flag

- Coahuila y Tejas within Mexico
- Capital: Saltillo Monclova (March 9, 1833)
- Demonym: Coahuiltejano
- Area
  - 1824^{[a]}: 555,500 km^{2} (214,500 sq mi)
  - Texas: 389,400 km^{2} (150,300 sq mi)
  - Coahuila: 166,100 km^{2} (64,100 sq mi)
- Population
  - 1828: 70,955
- Government
  - Type: Federated state
- Legislature: Unicameral Congress
  - Upper house: Congreso del Estado Libre y Soberano de Coahuila y Tejas
- History
  - Mexican Independence: September 27, 1821
  - Established: May 7 1824
  - Texas Revolution: October 2, 1835
  - Disestablished: December 15, 1835
  - Texas annexation: December 29, 1845
| Preceded by | Succeeded by |
| Mexican Texas | Republic of Texas; Coahuila |
- Today part of: Mexico: Coahuila; United States; Texas
- a. Texas had approximately 389,400 km^{2} and Coahuila 166,100 km^{2}. Texas had 18 municipalities: San Antonio de Bexar, 2,400; Goliad, 700; Victoria, 300; San Patricio, 600; San Felipe, 2,500; Columbia, 2,100; Matagorda, 1,400; Gonzalez, 900; Mine, 1,100; Nacogdoches, 3,500; San Augustine, 2,500; Liberty, 1,000; Johnsburg, 2,000; Anahuac, 50; Bevil, 140; Teran, 10; Tenaha, 100.

Coahuila y Tejas, officially the Estado Libre y Soberano de Coahuila y Tejas (lit. 'Free and Sovereign State of Coahuila and Texas'), was one of the constituent states of the newly established United Mexican States under its 1824 Constitution.

It had two capitals: first Saltillo (1822–1825) for petition of Miguel Ramos Arizpe, that changing the capital for dispute of political groups, but Monclova recovered primacy because it was the colonial capital since 1689; this action provoked a struggle between the residents of Saltillo and Monclova in 1838–1840, but the political actions of Antonio López de Santa Anna convinced the monclovenses to accept the final change of political powers to Saltillo. In the case of Tejas its territory was organized for administrative purposes, with the state being divided into three districts: Béxar, comprising the area covered by Texas; Monclova, comprising northern Coahuila; and Río Grande Saltillo, comprising southern Coahuila.

The state remained in existence until the adoption of the 1835 "Constitutional Bases", whereby the federal republic was converted into a unitary one, and the nation's states (estados) were turned into departments (departamentos). The State of Coahuila and Texas was split in two and became the Department of Coahuila and the Department of Texas.

Both Coahuila and Texas seceded from Mexico after Antonio López de Santa Anna abolished Mexico's Constitution, ending the federal system and establishing a provisional centralist system. Texas eventually became the independent Republic of Texas. Yucatán, Nuevo León, Tamaulipas, and Tabasco later also declared their independence from Mexico for the same reasons as Coahuila and Texas. Coahuila joined with Nuevo León and Tamaulipas, to form the short-lived Republic of the Rio Grande.

== History ==
=== Formation ===
Mexico in 1824. Coahuila y Tejas is the northeasternmost state.

In 1821, the Mexican War of Independence severed the control that Spain had exercised on its North American territories, and the new country of Mexico was formed from much of the lands that had comprised New Spain. In the early days of the country, there was much disagreement over whether Mexico should be a federal republic or a constitutional monarchy. In 1824, a new constitution restructured the country as a federal republic with nineteen states and four territories. One of the new states was Coahuila y Tejas, which combined the sparsely populated Spanish provinces of Texas and Coahuila. The poorest state in the Mexican federation, Coahuila y Tejas covered the boundaries of Spanish Texas but did not include the area around El Paso, which belonged to the state of Chihuahua and the area of Laredo, which became part of Tamaulipas.

Erasmo Seguin, Texas's representative to Congress during the constitutional deliberations, originally advocated for Texas to become a federal territory. He knew that Texas's small population and insufficient resources made the region ill-prepared to be an independent state, and that the federal government had an obligation to assist territories. Because Coahuila was more populous than Texas, he feared that in a combined state Coahuila would wield greater power in decision making. The representative from Coahuila, Miguel Ramos Arizpe, was likewise concerned that his region was ill-equipped to become an independent state. Ramos Arizpe was unwilling to join with other nearby states, as Coahuila compared unfavorably to those states in either population or economy and would thus be a weaker partner. To convince the Texans to join forces with Coahuila, Ramos Arizpe wrote to the ayuntamiento in Bexar to warn the political leaders that a territory would lose its ownership of public lands to the federal government. State governments retained ownership of public land. This was enough to persuade the Texans to drop their opposition to the merger.

=== Immigration and slavery ===
The federal government had little money to spare for the military, so settlers were empowered to create their own militias to help control hostile native tribes. The border region of Texas faced frequent raids by Apache and Comanche tribes. In the hopes that an influx of settlers could control the raids, the government liberalized its immigration policies, and settlers from the United States were permitted to move to Mexico.

States were responsible for implementing the General Colonization Law. Officials in Saltillo, the capital of Coahuila y Tejas, were soon besieged by foreign land speculators who wanted to claim land in Texas. The state enacted its own colonization law in 1825. Approximately 3,420 land grant applications were submitted by immigrants and naturalized citizens, many of them Anglo-Americans. Only one of the twenty-four empresarios, Martín De León settled citizens from within Mexico; the others came primarily from the United States.

From the time Mexico became independent from Spain, there was public support for abolishing slavery. Fears of an economic crisis if all of the slaves were simultaneously freed led to a gradual emancipation policy. In 1823, Mexico forbade the sale or purchase of slaves, and required that the children of slaves be freed when they reached fourteen. Any slave introduced into Mexico by purchase or trade would also be freed. Many of the colonists in Texas, however, had already owned slaves and were allowed to bring them to the new territory when they immigrated from the United States.

In 1827, the legislature of Coahuila y Tejas banned the admission of additional slaves into the state and granted freedom at birth to all children born to a slave. The new laws also stated that any slave brought into Texas should be freed within six months. Two years later, slavery was officially prohibited in Mexico. The governor of Coahuila y Tejas, Jose Maria Viesca, wrote to the president to explain the importance of slavery to the east Texas economy, and the importance of the Texas economy to the development of the state. Texas was temporarily exempted from the slavery prohibition rule. By 1830, the state was ordered to comply in full with the emancipation law. Many colonists converted their slaves to indentured servants with 99-year terms, a practice which the state also banned in 1832.

=== Tensions ===
As the number of Americans living in Texas blossomed, Mexican authorities became apprehensive that the United States might wish to annex the area, possibly using force. On April 6, 1830, the Mexican government passed a series of laws restricting immigration from the United States into Texas. The laws also cancelled all unfilled empresario contracts and called for the first enforcement of customs duties. Implementation of the new laws angered colonists in Texas, and in June 1832 a group of armed settlers marched on the military base at Anahuac, and deposed the commander, Juan Davis Bradburn. A second group forced the surrender of another Mexican military commander at the Battle of Velasco. The small rebellion coincided with a revolt led by General Antonio Lopez de Santa Anna against the centralist policies of Mexican president Anastasio Bustamante. Texans aligned themselves with Santa Anna's federalist policies.

Settlers in Texas continued to press for changes in Mexican law. In 1833, they requested separate statehood, going so far as to draft a proposed state constitution.

In March 1833, the capital of the state was transferred from Saltillo to Monclova, which was closer to Tejas. Shortly thereafter, civil war erupted as the federal government moved away from federalism and towards a more centralized government. As fighting erupted, residents in Saltillo declared that Monclova had been illegally made the state capital and selected a new governor. Texans in Saltillo recommended establishing a provisional government in Bexar during the unrest to strengthen the autonomy of Texas. Juan Seguin, political chief of Bexar, called for a town meeting to create a government but was forced to postpone it when Mexican troops advanced in the direction of Texas.

In 1835, it could be seen that Texas had become separated within itself, with natives and venturers looking to gain control over pieces of available land. There was an attempt to put a stop to this separation by legislation, using special orders to restrict the issuing of land titles. This attempt was semi-successful, since land titles had extensively been put out in years before, leading to the self-righteousness of land owners. With so much resistance, the legislature of Coahuila y Tejas didn’t have much of a foothold. They decided to look towards Congress to handle these problems, which were dealt with by the issuing of the general land law.

=== Disestablishment ===
In 1835, President Santa Anna revoked the Constitution of 1824 and began consolidating his power. In various parts of the country federalists revolted, and in May 1835 Santa Anna brutally crushed a revolt in Zacatecas. The federalists, including Agustín Viesca, the governor of Coahuila y Tejas, were afraid that Santa Anna would march against Coahuila after subduing the rebels in Zacatecas, so they disbanded the state legislature on May 21, 1835, and authorized the governor to set up an office in a different part of the state. Viesca was arrested as he traveled to San Antonio. When Viesca escaped and reached Texas, no one recognized him as governor. In October 1835, Santa Anna abolished all state governments, replacing them with administrative divisions from Mexico City. Settlers in Texas revolted the same month, and, at the conclusion of the Texas Revolution in April 1836, Texas had become self-established as the independent Republic of Texas.

== Government ==
Possible flag of the Mexican State of Coahuila y Tejas 1824–1836

Coahuila y Tejas was divided into several departments, each of which was governed by a political chief. Departments were further subdivided into municipalities, which were governed by alcaldes, similar to a modern-day mayor. Each municipality also had an elected ayuntamiento, similar to a city council. Originally, all of Texas was included in the Department of Béxar, while Coahuila comprised several departments. After many protests from residents of Texas, in early 1834 the region was divided into three departments, Béxar, Brazos, and Nacogdoches. At the same time, Texas was granted three representatives to the state legislature from the original two.

Laws were set by a state legislature. Ten of the 12 members were elected from Coahuila, with two coming from Texas. Legislators met at the state capital, originally Saltillo, Coahuila, later Monclova, Coahuila. The choice of capital city was controversial; Saltillo was located in the extreme south of the state, more than 300 leagues from the northernmost part of Texas.

=== State Constitution ===
The state of Coahuila y Tejas established its own constitution on the 11th of May in 1827. This was the first ever constitution of Texas to be constructed and officially established. It was created under President Santiago del Valle and Vice President Juan Y. Campos. This constitution was given with 225 articles throughout seven titles containing multiple sections. It is 30 pages long, containing detailed articles with descriptions of the state’s procedures when it comes to protecting its citizens’ rights and how the citizens should act in respect to the state. The constitution also provides information on the state’s government and how Coahuila y Tejas will interact with other states. When the state's constitution was established, Coahuila y Tejas officially came together as one and emerged as the largest state in Mexico.

=== Defense ===
The federal government recognized that border states required a different military model than other states. In 1826, Coahuila y Tejas and the nearby states of Tamaulipas and Nuevo León were placed under a single military commandant general, who was stationed near Laredo. According to the regulations, each of the garrisons in Texas (at the Alamo Mission in Bexar and at Presidio La Bahia in Goliad) should have 107 soldiers, not including officers. By 1832 there were a combined 70 soldiers with guns (with an additional 70 who had no weapons). The federal government occasionally established other garrisons within Texas, but when the immediate threat was considered to be gone the garrisons were usually disbanded. The bulk of the rest of the army remained in Mexico City, in large part so its leaders could curry political favor.

The government had little money, and troops were often unpaid, with ammunition, guns, and food in short supply. In many cases townspeople were forced to provide food and other supplies to the soldiers. Few men volunteered for military service in the frontier, so many garrisons were composed of convicts or others forcibly recruited.

In 1828, Coahuila y Tejas passed legislation authorizing an official state militia. Texas had at least three militia units – at Bexar, Goliad, and in Stephen F. Austin's colony along the Brazos River.

== Demographics ==
Despite the influx of settlers from the United States after the colonization laws were passed, the majority of settlers within Coahuila y Tejas were either Mexican citizens or Tejanos. Texas made up only a minority of the state's population. Within Texas, however, by 1830 approximately 80% of the population was from the United States or Europe. Most of the demography consisted of Anglo-Saxon settlers, with little to no Mexican or Spanish settlers. In contrast, Coahuila had mainly Mexican settlers with less Anglo-Saxon settlers in comparison.

In the frontier areas of the state, similar to the rest of the Mexican frontier, there was more ethnic intermarriage than in the interior regions. Although both the federal and state constitutions established the Catholic Church as the official religion, the frontier areas often disobeyed the rule.

== Economy ==
For the most part, only enough food was grown for use in the area; little was exported. This was partially due to labor shortages and partly due to raids from native tribes. Wild game was abundant, and many families survived by hunting, keeping a few head of livestock, and subsistence farming.

Within Texas, the economy depended heavily on the cultivation of cotton. In 1834, Texas exported over 7,000 bales of cotton. Ranching was also lucrative, and Texas exported over 5,000 head of cattle in 1834. Lumber was exported in small quantities, primarily to Matamoros. In the mid-1830s, Texas imported approximately $630,000 worth of goods. Exports amounted to only about $500,000. The trade deficit resulted in a lack of currency in Texas; in a report to his superiors Juan Almonte estimated that only about 10% of transactions within Texas were conducted with specie.

Much of the trade was run by recent immigrants; few Tejanos were involved in exporting or industry. The newcomers may have had increased access to capital markets and to transportation, and may have had closer ties with, or at least a better understanding of, foreign markets.

Many inhabitants of the Mexican frontier chafed at rules that limited trade with the United States. As these areas, including Texas, were far from federal – and often state – control, smuggling was rampant. Coahuila did not have a coastline, and thus could not import goods from other countries. From 1823 through 1830, Texas settlers had an exemption on tariffs for some goods. Tariffs could not be collected on other goods because there was no customs house to collect the duties. A customs house was established in Anahuac in 1830, but the soldiers were expelled by settlers in 1832. A similar incident occurred in 1835, again resulting in the closure of the customs house. Texas continued to serve as a smuggling haven, with some of the goods being sent into the Mexican interior and into the territory of New Mexico.

== Map gallery ==
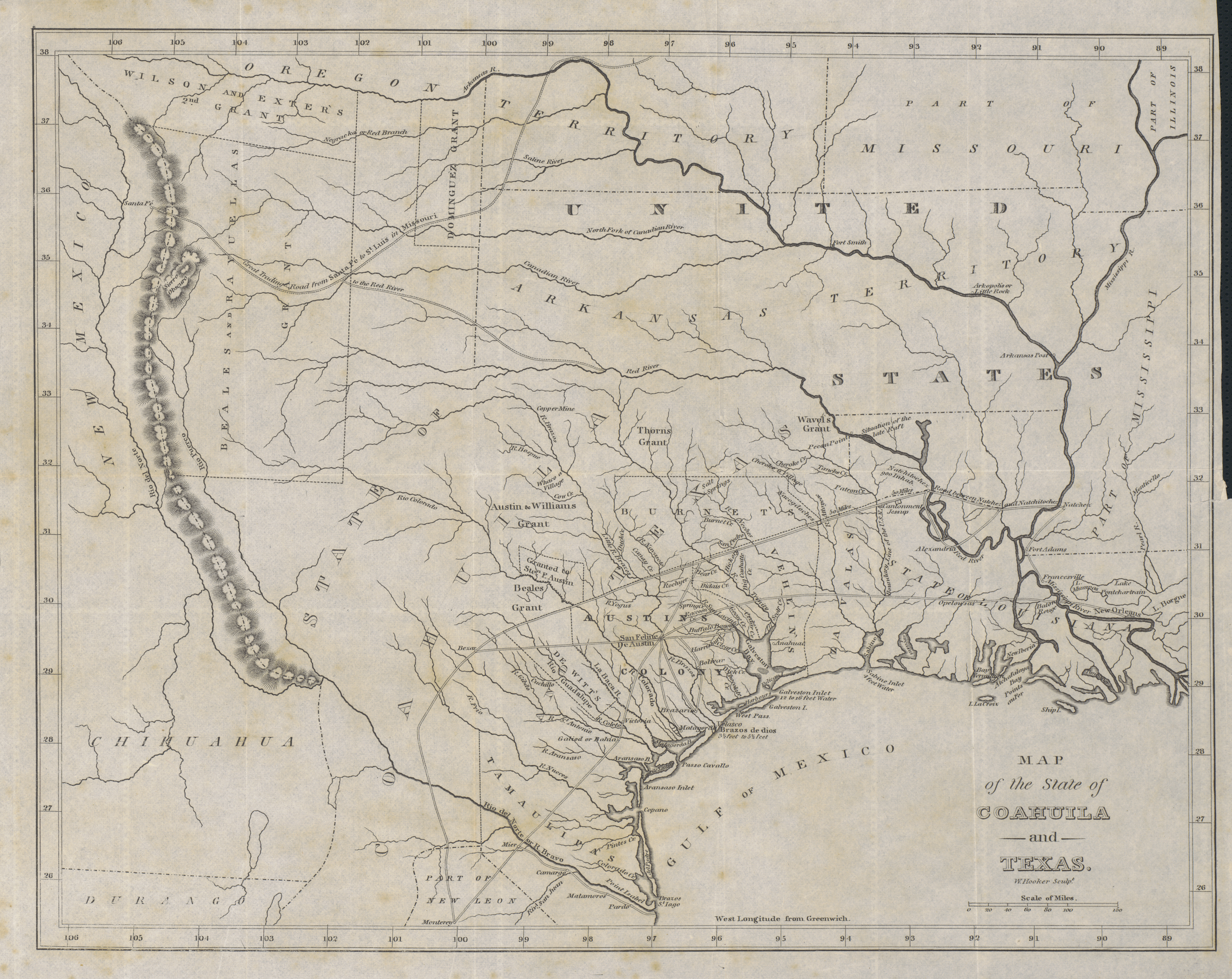
1833 map of Coahuila y Tejas

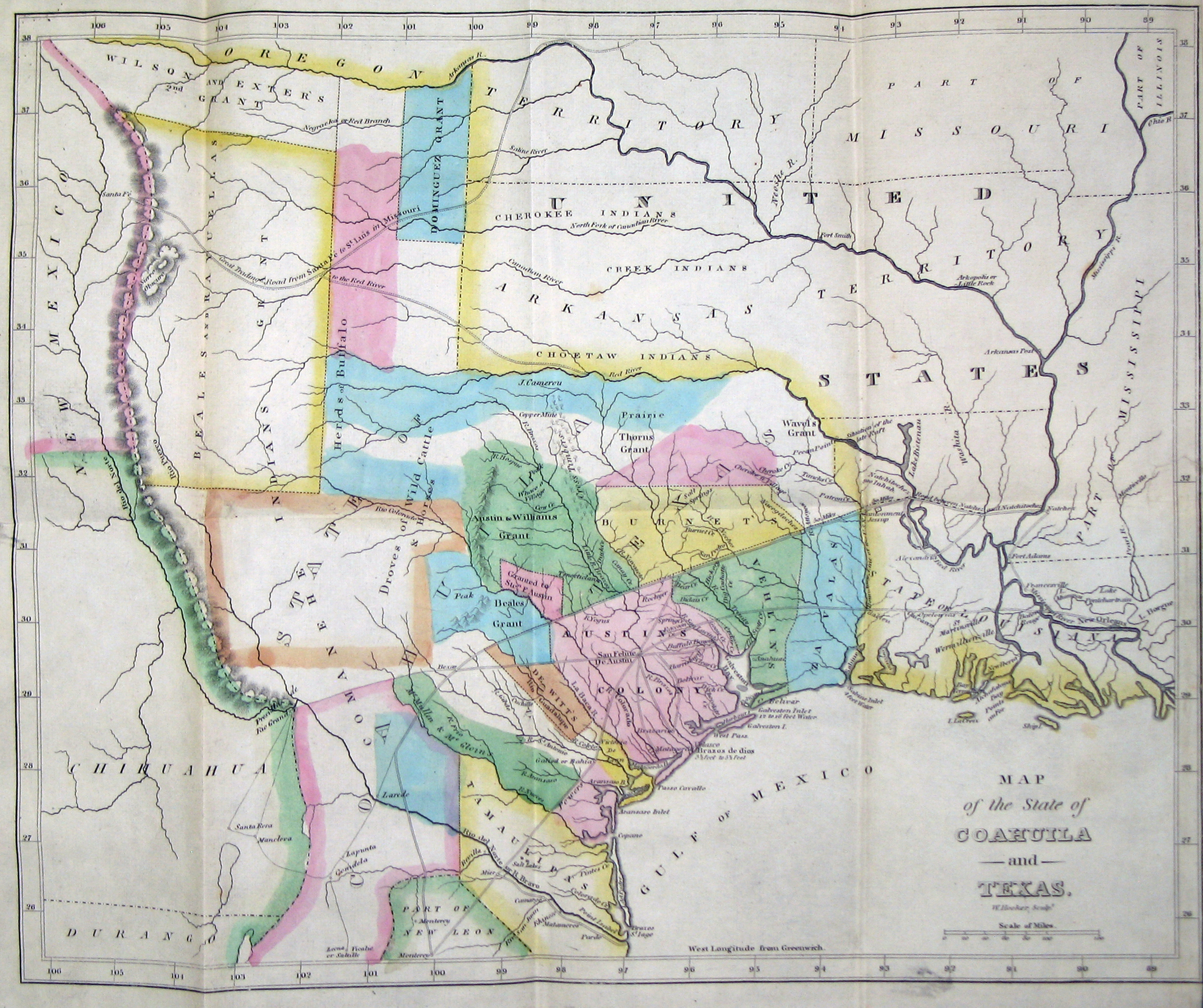
1834 map

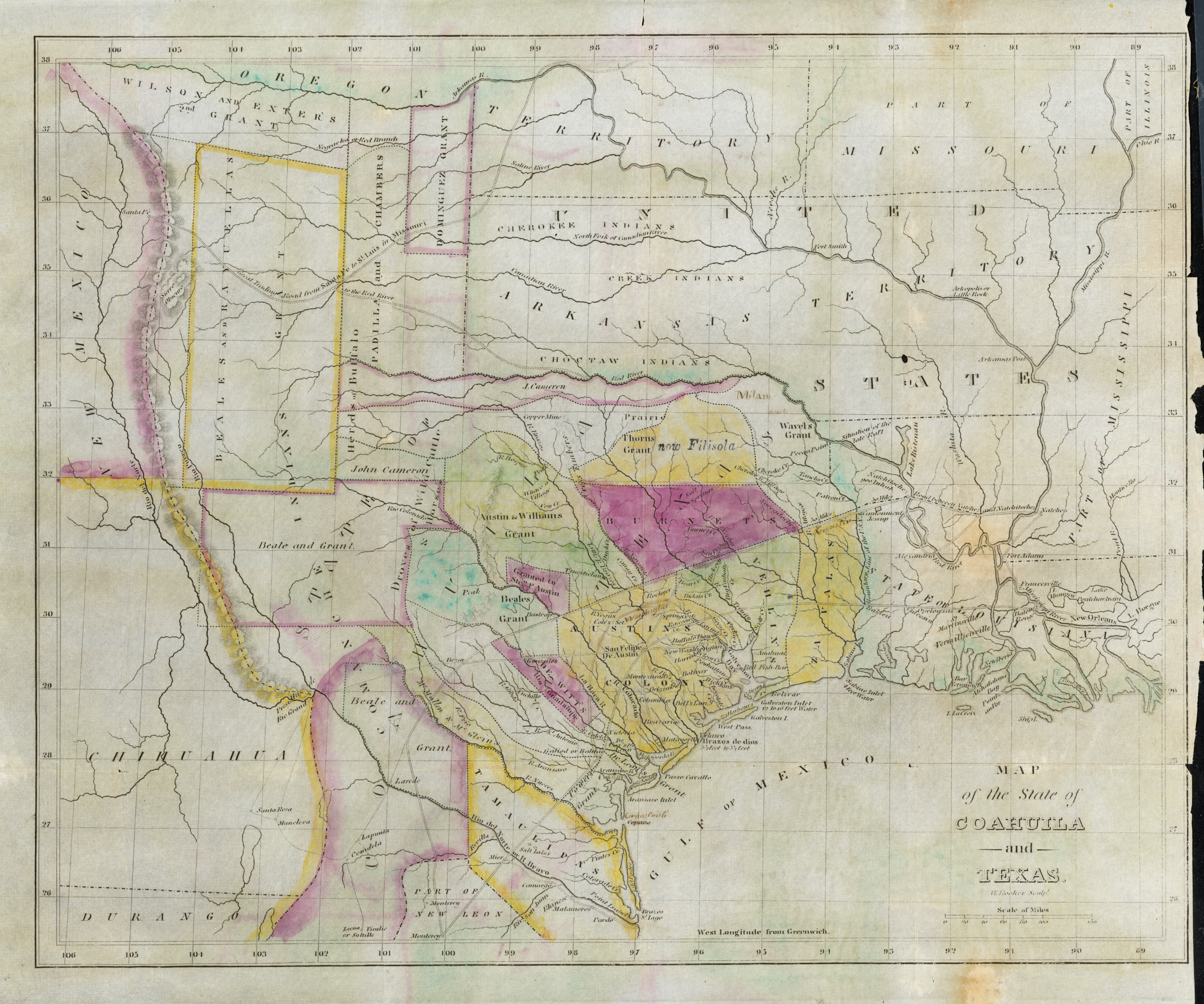
1836 map

== See also ==
- Mexican Texas
- Fredonian Rebellion
- Law of April 6, 1830
- Territorial evolution of Mexico
- States of Mexico

== Sources ==
- Coahuila and Texas (Mexico). (1839). Laws and Decrees of the State of Coahuila and Texas, in Spanish and English: to Which Is Added the Constitution of Said State. (J.P. Kimball, Trans.) Houston: Telegraph Power Press. pp. 313-343.
- de la Teja, Jesus F. (1952). "The Historical Governance of Texas: From Coahuila to Independence". Texas State Historical Association. Retrieved 2025-10-02.
- de la Teja, Jesus F. (1997), "The Colonization and Independence of Texas: A Tejano Perspective", in Rodriguez O., Jaime E.; Vincent, Kathryn (eds.), Myths, Misdeeds, and Misunderstandings: The Roots of Conflict in U.S.–Mexican Relations, Wilmington, DE: Scholarly Resources Inc., ISBN 0-8420-2662-2
- Edmondson, J.R. (2000), The Alamo Story-From History to Current Conflicts, Plano, TX: Republic of Texas Press, ISBN 1-55622-678-0
- Ericson, Joe E. (2000), The Nacogdoches story: an informal history, Heritage Books, ISBN 978-0-7884-1657-6
- Gonzalez Oropeza, Manuel. (2019). "Genesis of the Constitution of Coahuila and Texas: Debates and Agreements in the Construction of Its Only Magna Carta" (PDF). Journal of the Texas Supreme Court Historical Society. 8 (3): pp. 23–37.
- Henson, Margaret Swett (1982), Juan Davis Bradburn: A Reappraisal of the Mexican Commander of Anahuac, College Station, TX: Texas A&M University Press, ISBN 978-0-89096-135-3
- Manchaca, Martha (2001), Recovering History, Constructing Race: The Indian, Black, and White Roots of Mexican Americans, The Joe R. and Teresa Lozano Long Series in Latin American and Latino Art and Culture, Austin, TX: University of Texas Press, ISBN 0-292-75253-9
- Mintz, Steven (2009), Mexican American Voices: A Documentary Reader, Volume 4 of Uncovering the Past: Documentary Readers in American History, Wiley-Blackwell, ISBN 978-1-4051-8260-7
- Morton, Ohland (July 1943), "Life of General Don Manuel de Mier y Teran", Southwestern Historical Quarterly, 47 (1), Texas State Historical Association, archived from the original on 2020-08-09
- Nugent, Walter (2009), Habits of Empire: a History of American Expansionism, Random House, ISBN 978-1-4000-7818-9
- Vazquez, Josefina Zoraida (1997), "The Colonization and Loss of Texas: A Mexican Perspective", in Rodriguez O., Jaime E.; Vincent, Kathryn (eds.), Myths, Misdeeds, and Misunderstandings: The Roots of Conflict in U.S.–Mexican Relations, Wilmington, DE: Scholarly Resources Inc., ISBN 0-8420-2662-2
- Weber, David J. (1982), The Mexican frontier, 1821-1846: the American Southwest under Mexico, Histories of the American frontier, University of New Mexico Press, ISBN 978-0-8263-0603-6
- Yoakum, Henderson K. (1855). "History of Texas: From Its First Settlement in 1685 to Its Annexation to the United States in 1846, Volume 2". The Portal to Texas History. Retrieved 2025-10-08
