= Empresario =

Type of settler in Coahuila y Tejas

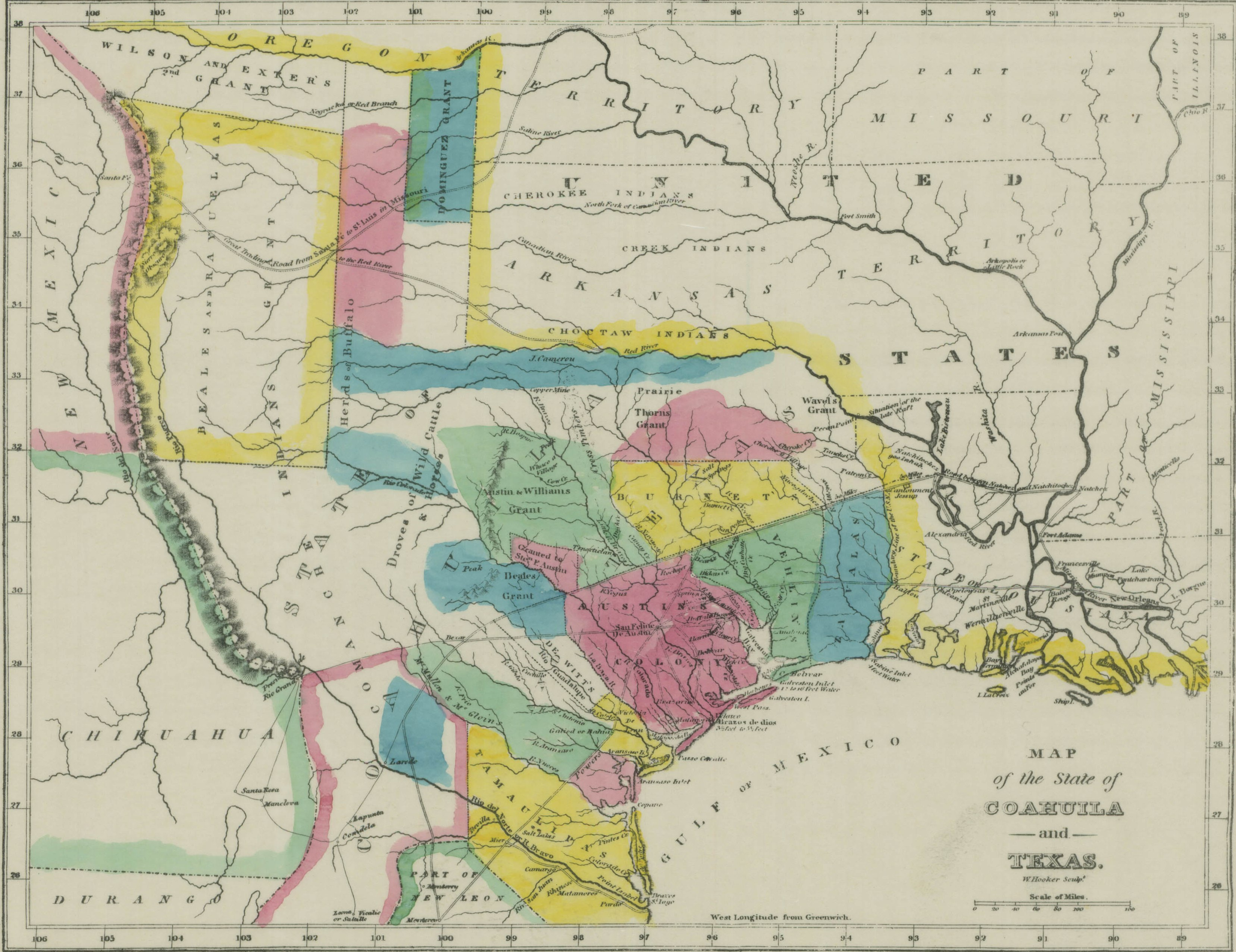
Map of Texas in 1833 showing several of the land grants

An empresario (Spanish pronunciation: [em.pɾe.ˈsaɾ.jo]) was a person who entered into a contract with the Spanish or Mexican government during the early nineteenth century in order to settle on sizeable grants of land in exchange for recruiting families and settling land in areas of then Coahuila y Tejas. (The word empresario is in current use in Spanish, meaning "businessman" or "entrepreneur".)

== Stephen F. Austin ==
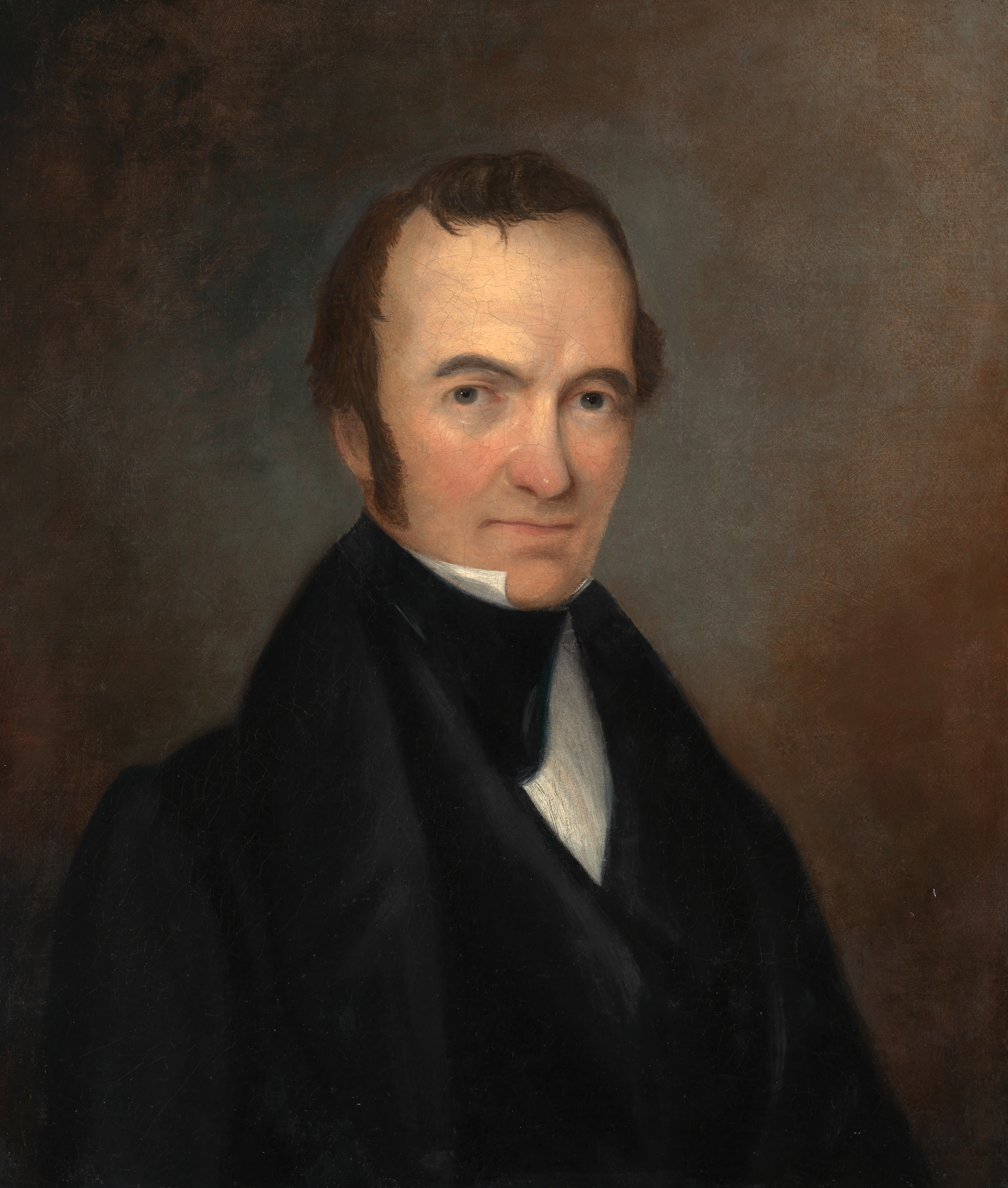
Stephen F. Austin, known as the "Father of Texas"

Stephen F. Austin, also known as "The Father of Texas", is most known for bringing over the first group of colonists into the state of Texas, this group is famously known as The Old Three Hundred.

He was born to Moses and Maria Austin on November 3rd in the year 1798 somewhere in southwestern Virginia before his family relocated to southeastern Missouri where the town of Potosi was then established. That is where Austin spent his time getting educated until he turned eleven, which is the age in which Moses sent him to Connecticut to receive a proper education. After attending his grade school there, he spent two years in Transylvania University in the state of Kentucky.

After returning home in the spring of 1810, Stephen worked as the manager of his father's general store while also serving in his town's local militia and obtaining the charter for the Bank of St. Louis. After the failure of his family's business, he made a new life for himself in the state of Arkansas as a circuit judge where he served from July 1820 to August of the same year. He moved yet again to the city of New Orleans, there in which he lived with Joseph H. Hawkins, a close friend who later helped with the colonization of Texas. During this time, Moses Austin had traveled to San Antonio to apply for the land grant that his son would later inherit.

In the year 1821, Moses Austin's land grant was approved, giving him permission to settle 300 families in the state of Texas, known then as Coahuila y Tejas, but he died shortly after the approval, leaving Stephen to inherit his father's empresario contract. Stephen F. Austin was unable to settle the land until later that year and quickly found willing colonists to join him. The Old Three Hundred, as the title in which this group is famously known by, arrived in Texas from 1823 to 1824. During this time, Austin worked to two land commissioners, Baron de Bastrop and Gaspar Flores de Abrego, to issue titles. The land in which was settled along the Brazos, Colorado and San Bernard Rivers, most of which is considered modern-day Brazos County and the area of San Felipe de Austin.

== Background ==
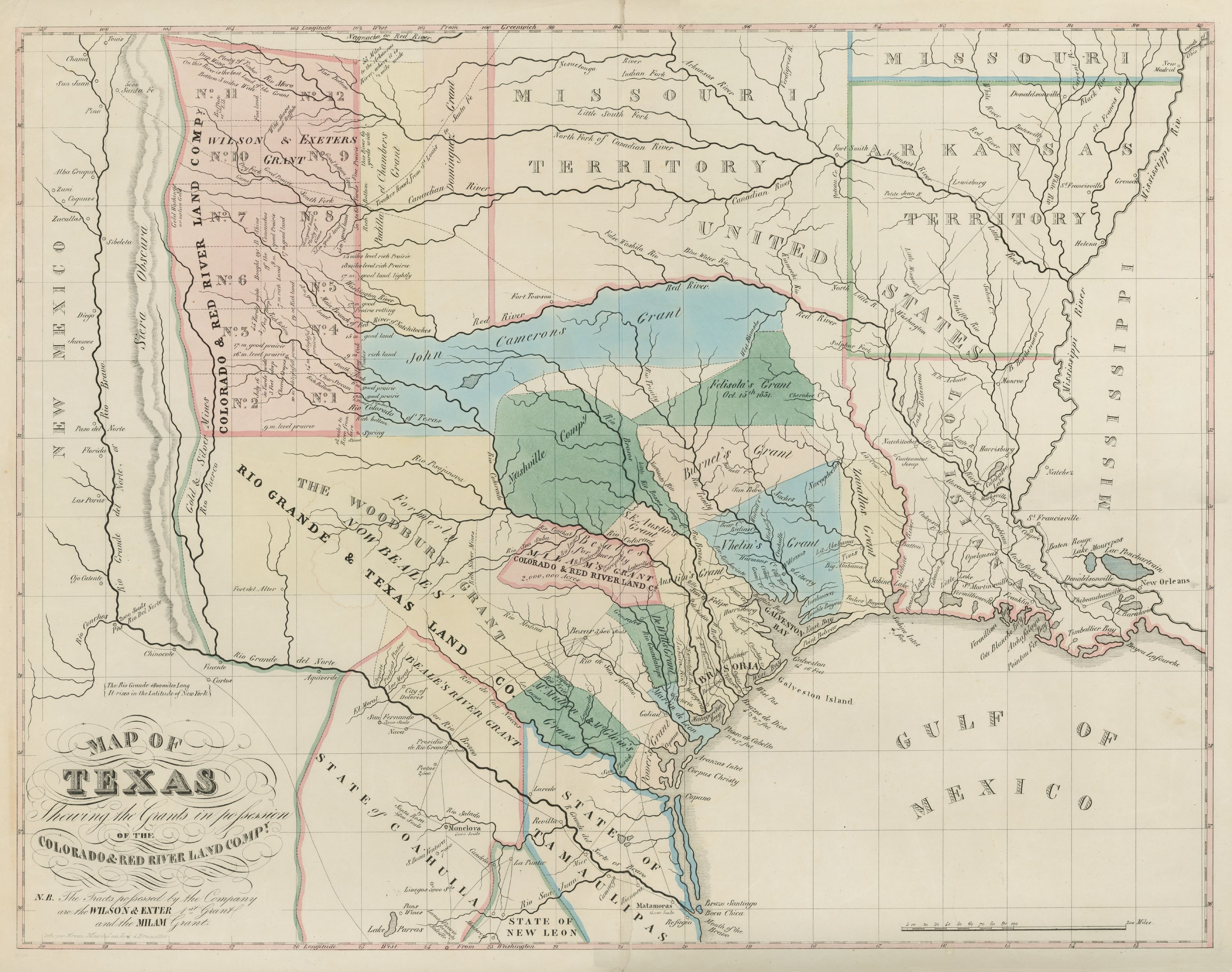
Colorado & Red River Land Co. map of empresario grants, circa 1835

In the late 18th century, Spain stopped allocating new lands in much of Spanish Texas, stunting the growth of the province. Spain's shift in policy reflected growing concern over U.S. expansionism and the declining population of its northern frontier, which left Texas vulnerable to foreign encroachment. It changed this policy in 1820 and made it more flexible, allowing colonists of any religion to settle in Texas (formerly settlers were required to be Catholic, the established religion of the Spanish Empire). Moses Austin, an American colonist, was the only man granted an empresarial contract in Texas under Spanish law. But Moses Austin died before he could begin his colony, and Mexico achieved its independence from Spain in September 1821. At this time, about 3500 colonists lived in Texas, mostly congregated at San Antonio and La Bahia.

The Mexican government continued the generous immigration policies in order to develop east Texas. Mexican officials viewed Anglo-American immigration as a strategic buffer against Indigenous groups such as the Comanche, whose raids threatened settlement stability in the region. Even as the government debated a new colonization law, Stephen F. Austin, son of Moses Austin, was given permission to take over his father's colonization contract. Stephen F. Austin is probably the best known and most successful empresario in Texas. The first group of colonists, known as the Old Three Hundred, arrived in 1822 and settled along the Brazos River, ranging from the Gulf of Mexico to near present-day Dallas.

In 1823, Mexico’s authoritarian ruler Agustín de Iturbide enacted a colonization law authorizing the national government to enter into a contract granting land to an “empresario,” or promoter, who was required to recruit a minimum of two hundred families to settle the grant.

Mexico approved immigration on a wider basis in 1824 with enactment of the General Colonization Law. This law authorized all heads of household who were citizens of or immigrants to Mexico as eligible to claim land. The law also authorized individual Mexican states to establish their own colonization regulations, which allowed Coahuila y Tejas to adopt its own laws governing land distribution and empresario contracts. After the law was enacted, the state government of Coahuila y Tejas was inundated with requests by foreign speculators to establish colonies within the state. There was no shortage of people willing to come to Texas. The United States was still struggling with the aftermath of the Panic of 1819, and soaring land prices within the United States made the Mexican land policy seem very generous.

Most successful empresarios recruited colonists primarily in the United States. Only two of the groups that attempted to recruit in Europe built lasting colonies, Refugio and San Patricio. These colonies were successful in part because the empresarios spoke Spanish, were Catholic and generally familiar with Mexican ways, and allowed local Mexican families to join their colonies.

Mexican officials grew increasingly concerned about Anglo-American settlers' insistence on bringing enslaved people into Texas, which conflicted with evolving national policies on slavery. In 1829, Mexico abolished slavery, which affected the Anglo-American settlers’ quest for wealth in building colonizations worked by enslaved Africans. They lobbied the Mexican government for a reversal of the ban and gained only a one-year extension to settle their affairs and free their bonded workers—the government refused to legalize slavery. In response to the tensions, the Mexican government passed the law of April 6, 1830, which prohibited further immigration from the United States and established new presidios to enforce customs and immigration laws. Anglo-Texan colonists responded by organizing conventions in 1832 and 1833, where they demanded renewed U.S. immigration and proposed that Texas become a separate Mexican state.

== Rules for settlers ==
Unlike its predecessor, the Mexican law required settlers to practice Catholicism and stressed that foreigners needed to learn Spanish. The Mexican authorities struggled to regulate migration of U.S. citizens due to resistance from Anglos and limited officials in the Mexican government. However, settlers were supposed to own property or have a craft or useful profession, and all people wishing to live in Texas were expected to report to the nearest Mexican authority for permission to settle. The rules were widely disregarded, and many families became squatters.

Under the new laws, people who did not already possess property in Texas could claim 4438 acres of irrigable land, with an additional 4438 available to those who owned cattle. Empresarios and individuals with large families were exempt from the limit. Soldiers were given first choice of land, followed by citizens and immigrants, and those who had held property under Spanish rule were allowed to retain is as long as they had not supported Spain during the war for independence. Immigrants were also expected to follow the same settlement policies as Mexican citizens, and Native Americans who moved into Texas after independence were treated as immigrants under the law. Colonists were also required to provide proof of their Christian faith, good moral character, and good habits before receiving title to land.

== Notable empresarios ==
Empresario	Colony location	Capital	Notes Empresido of Mexico in New Madrid, Spanish Louisiana Territory,
Philip Alston (counterfeiter)	New Madrid, Spanish Louisiana Territory	New Orleans	sold land grants
Stephen F. Austin	Austin's Colony between Brazos and Colorado rivers	San Felipe De Austin	took over his father Moses Austin's empresario contract and later secured additional grants to settle 100 families near Bastrop and 800 more across Texas.
David G. Burnet	East Texas, northwest of Nacogdoches		sold his land grant to the Galveston Bay and Texas Land Company
Martín De León	De León's Colony	Victoria	The only colony that was primarily Mexican and not Anglo-American
Green DeWitt	DeWitt Colony	Gonzales	His colony was established partly to help defend against Comanche raids in central Texas.
Haden Harrison Edwards	East Texas – from the Navasota River to 20 leagues west of the Sabine River, and from 20 leagues north of the Gulf of Mexico to 15 leagues north of the town of Nacogdoches.	Nacogdoches	Expelled from Texas after launching the Fredonia Rebellion in 1827
Benjamin Drake Lovell and John Purnell	Nueces River, Medina River junction within Bexar county Source: Official website for detailed information.		Attempted to establish a socialist colony; Purnell died and Lovell abandoned the colony in 1826; land was later given to McMullen and McGloin.
John McMullen and James McGloin	Lies between Nueces and Medina rivers Source: Historic Texas Maps for detailed map.	San Patricio	of Irish descent, these men recruited primarily European settlers
James Power and James Hewetson	Land between Guadalupe and Lavaca rivers.	San Patricio and Refugio	Half of settlers were to come from Ireland, the other half from Mexico.
Sterling C. Robertson	An area along the Brazos River about 100 miles wide and 200 miles long, centered on Waco, comprising all or some of thirty present-day counties in Central Texas.	Sarahville	At various times also called Robertson's Colony, the Texas Association, Leftwich's Grant, the Nashville colony, or the upper colony.
Lorenzo de Zavala	southeastern Texas in the Galveston Bay Area		transferred ownership to the Galveston Bay and Texas Land Company
Henri Castro	southwestern Texas on the Medina River	Castroville	French-born diplomat and empresario, one of the faces of Texan empresario. Source: Texas State Historical Association for further details.

== After Texas Independence ==
After the Republic of Texas won its independence from Mexico, the young nation continued its own version of the empresario program, offering grants to French diplomat Henri Castro and abolitionist Charles Fenton Mercer, among others. Mercer later organized the Texas Association to finance and promote settlement under his empresario contract after receiving it in 1844. By this time, many earlier empresario contracts had already been canceled or suspended under Mexican law, especially after the 1830 immigration restrictions and the political instability that followed. The new Texan government used empresario grants primarily to encourage settlement in frontier regions and to strengthen defenses against Indigenous groups such as the Comanche. In 1837, the Republic of Texas declared that empresario contracts had ended with the Texas Declaration of Independence.

== See also ==
- Ranchos of California
- Patroon (a similar system in New Netherland)

== Sources ==
- Davis, Graham (2002), Land!: Irish Pioneers in Mexican and Revolutionary Texas, Centennial Series of the Association of Former Students, Texas A&M University; No. 92, College Station, TX: Texas A&M University Press, ISBN 978-1-58544-189-1
- de la Teja, Jesus F. (1997), "The Colonization and Independence of Texas: A Tejano Perspective", in Rodriguez O., Jaime E.; Vincent, Kathryn (eds.), Myths, Misdeeds, and Misunderstandings: The Roots of Conflict in U.S.–Mexican Relations, Wilmington, DE: Scholarly Resources Inc., ISBN 0-8420-2662-2
- "The Irish Empresarios". Discover Texas Online. May 19, 2021.
- Edmondson, J.R. (2000), The Alamo Story-From History to Current Conflicts, Plano, TX: Republic of Texas Press, ISBN 1-55622-678-0
- Ericson, Joe E. (2000), The Nacogdoches story: an informal history, Heritage Books, ISBN 978-0-7884-1657-6
- Manchaca, Martha (2001), Recovering History, Constructing Race: The Indian, Black, and White Roots of Mexican Americans, The Joe R. and Teresa Lozano Long Series in Latin American and Latino Art and Culture, Austin, TX: University of Texas Press, ISBN 0-292-75253-9
- Vazquez, Josefina Zoraida (1997), "The Colonization and Loss of Texas: A Mexican Perspective", in Rodriguez O., Jaime E.; Vincent, Kathryn (eds.), Myths, Misdeeds, and Misunderstandings: The Roots of Conflict in U.S.–Mexican Relations, Wilmington, DE: Scholarly Resources Inc., ISBN 0-8420-2662-2
- Whitehurst, Katie (2013). "Mexican Rule". Texas PBS. Texas: Texas PBS.
- Henderson, Mary Virginia (July 1928). "Minor Empresario Contracts for the Colonization of Texas, 1825-1834, II". The Southwestern Historical Quarterly. 32 (1). Texas State Historical Association: 1–28. JSTOR 30235006.
- Williams, Amelia W. (2016), Henri Castro, Texas State Historical Association
- “The Texas Empresarios.” Discover Texas, 6 Nov. 2023, www.discovertexasonline.com/2023/11/the-texas-empresarios-2.
- Texas State Historical Association. “Austin, Stephen Fuller.” Texas State Historical Association, www.tshaonline.org/handbook/entries/austin-stephen-fuller.
- “Areas of Interest.” Stephen F. Austin | Texas State Library, www.tsl.texas.gov/treasures/giants/austin/austin-01. Accessed 4 May 2025.
- Barker, Eugene C. n.d. “Empresario.” Handbook of Texas Online. Texas State Historical Association
- De León, Arnoldo, and Jesús de la Teja. “The Impact of the Mexican War of Independence on Texas.” Handbook of Texas Online. Texas State Historical Association
- Barker, Eugene C. n.d. “Mexican Colonization Laws.” Handbook of Texas Online. Texas State Historical Association
- Wallenfeldt, Jeff. “Texas Revolution.” Britannica, 20 Apr. 2026, www.britannica.com/topic/Texas-Revolution. Accessed 28 Apr. 2026.
