= Convention of 1832 =

First political gathering of colonists in Mexican Texas

The Convention of 1832 was the first political gathering of colonists in Mexican Texas. Delegates sought reforms from the Mexican government and hoped to quell the widespread belief that settlers in Texas wished to secede from Mexico. The convention was the first in a series of unsuccessful attempts at political negotiation that eventually led to the Texas Revolution.

Under the 1824 Constitution of Mexico, Texas was denied independent statehood and merged into the new state Coahuila y Tejas. After growing suspicion that the United States government would attempt to seize Texas by force, in 1830 Mexican President Anastasio Bustamante enacted the Law of April 6, 1830 which restricted immigration and called for customs duty enforcement. Tensions erupted in June 1832, when Texas residents systematically expelled all Mexican troops from eastern Texas.

The lack of military oversight emboldened the colonists to increase their political activity. On October 1, 1832, 55 political delegates met at San Felipe de Austin to petition for changes in the governance of Texas. Notably absent was any representation from San Antonio de Béxar, where many of the native Mexican settlers (Tejanos) lived. The delegates elected Stephen F. Austin, a highly respected empresario, as president of the convention.

Delegates passed a series of resolutions requesting, among other things, a repeal of the immigration restrictions, a three-year exclusion from customs duties enforcement, permission to form an armed militia and independent statehood. They also voted themselves the power to call future conventions. Before the petition could be delivered to Mexico City, the political chief of Texas, Ramón Músquiz, ruled that the convention was illegal and annulled the resolutions. In a compromise, the ayuntamiento (city council) of San Antonio de Béxar drafted a new petition with similar language to the convention resolutions and submitted it through proper legal channels. Músquiz forwarded the new document to the Mexican Congress.

== Background ==
In 1821, several of Spain's former colonies in the New World won their independence and joined together to create a new country, Mexico. The Constitution of 1824 established Mexico as a federalist republic comprising multiple states. Sparsely populated former Spanish provinces were denied independent statehood and instead merged with neighboring areas. The former Spanish Texas, which marked Mexico's eastern border with the United States, was combined to Coahuila to form the new state Coahuila y Tejas. To assist in governing the large area, the state was subdivided into several departments; all of Texas was included in the Department of Béxar. With the formation of a new state government, the Texas provincial governing committee was forced to disband, and the capital was moved from San Antonio de Béxar to Saltillo. Many Tejanos—native Mexican citizens who lived in Texas—were reluctant to give up their self-rule.

The bankrupt federal government was unable to provide much military assistance to the settlers in Texas, who faced frequent raids by native tribes. Hoping that an influx of settlers could control the raids, in 1824 the government appointed empresarios to encourage families from the United States and Europe to settle in Texas. However, as the number of settlers from the US and other non-Spanish-speaking areas increased in Texas, Mexican authorities became apprehensive that the United States might wish to annex the area, possibly using force. On April 6, 1830, the Mexican government passed a series of laws restricting immigration from the United States into Texas. The laws also canceled all unfilled empresario contracts and called for the first enforcement of customs duties.

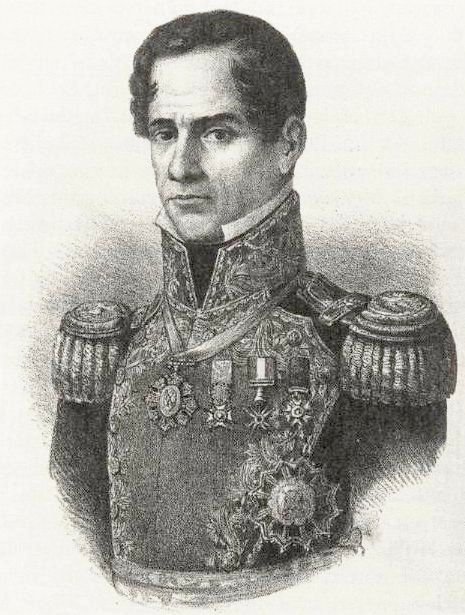
General Antonio Lopez de Santa Anna's revolt against the Mexican government gave the Texians an excuse for their own rebellion.

The new laws angered both Tejanos and recent immigrants (Texians). Stephen F. Austin, a well-respected empresario who had brought the first group of American settlers to Texas, warned Mexican President Anastasio Bustamante that the laws seemed designed to destroy the colonies. Texas's two delegates to the state legislature, both Tejanos, were so vocal in their opposition that one of them was expelled from the legislature. Austin was elected to fill his seat, and in December 1830 he left for Saltillo.

Implementation of the laws led to much tension within Texas. Much to the displeasure of the colonists, a new military post was established in Anahuac to begin collecting customs duties. The commander of the post, Colonel Juan Davis Bradburn, often clashed with the locals over his strict interpretation of Mexican law. In June 1832, colonists armed themselves and marched on Anahuac. As a result of these Anahuac Disturbances, Bradburn was forced to resign.

The small Texian rebellion coincided with a revolt led by General Antonio López de Santa Anna against Bustamante's centralist government. The chaos in the Mexican interior and the Texian success at Anahuac emboldened other Texas settlers to take arms against garrisons throughout eastern Texas. Within weeks, settlers expelled all Mexican soldiers from eastern Texas. Free from military oversight, the settlers began to increase their political activity.

== Meeting ==
Buoyed by their success, Texians organized a political convention to persuade Mexican authorities to weaken the Laws of April 6, 1830. On August 22, the ayuntamiento at San Felipe de Austin (the capital of Austin's colony) called for each district to elect five delegates. Although Austin attempted to dissuade the instigators, elections were held before his return from Saltillo. Sixteen communities chose delegates. The two municipalities with the largest Tejano population, San Antonio de Béxar and Victoria, refused to participate. The majority of the elected delegates were known as relatively even-tempered. Many known agitators, such as James Bowie and William B. Travis, were defeated. Tejanos did not have a large presence at the convention, largely due to the boycott by the Béxar and Victoria municipalities. Convention organizers invited several prominent Tejanos from these towns to attend, but all declined.

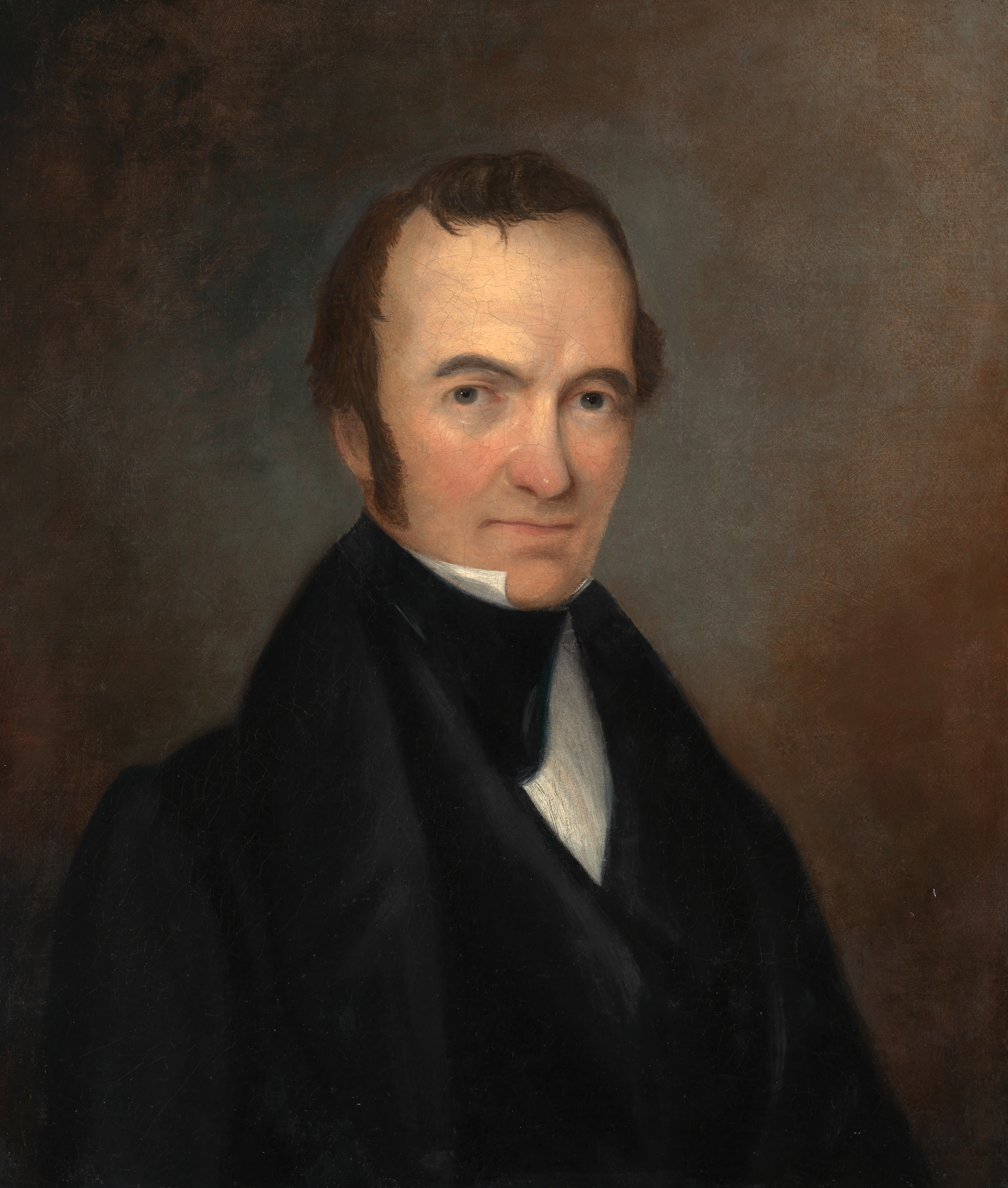
Stephen F. Austin was elected president of the convention.

On October 1, 1832, 55 delegates met in San Felipe de Austin; attendance may have been diminished due to the short notice. The gathering marked the first time residents from each of the colonies had convened to discuss common goals. The convention was called to order by John Austin, one of the alcaldes of San Felipe de Austin. In his remarks, John Austin laid out four key points that the convention needed to address: the "misrepresentations" made by "enemies of Texas" that the settlers desired independence from Mexico, an appeal of the restrictions on immigration from the United States, a method to grant land titles to residents in certain areas of the province, and reduction of tariffs on many imported items. The first order of business was the election of officers. Stephen F. Austin and William H. Wharton, a known hothead, were nominated to lead the convention; Austin won, 31–15. Frank W. Johnson, who had led the armed resistance at the Anahuac Disturbances, was elected secretary. In his acceptance speech, Austin praised the delegates for exerting their constitutional rights to petition the government.

Over the next six days, the delegates adopted a series of resolutions requesting changes in the governance of Texas. Historian Eugene Campbell Barker suggests that the discussions would likely not have concluded so swiftly unless the delegates had done "considerable preparation before the meeting". Several of the resolutions were designed to stimulate the local economy. Delegates requested that customs duty enforcement be delayed until 1835 and that citizens be granted a method to remove corrupt customs officers. Resolutions encouraged that land titles be issued more quickly and that public lands be sold to raise money for bilingual schools. Delegates from Nacogdoches asked that the government take a firmer hand in preventing new settlers from encroaching on lands that had previously been promised to native tribes. After explaining that law-abiding potential citizens were being excluded from Texas while disreputable squatters continued to stream illegally in, the delegates asked for the repeal of the prohibition on immigration from the United States. Furthermore, they requested permission to raise a militia, ostensibly for protection from marauding native tribes. The most controversial resolution asked that Texas become an independent state, separate from Coahuila. The separation request was added by a vote of 36–12. The motion included as justification the fact that Coahuila and Texas were very dissimilar in climate and economy and mentioned that Texas's limited representation in the state legislature made it very difficult to enact laws that specifically addressed the needs of its citizens. Delegates insisted that independent statehood was not a pretext for secession from Mexico.

After approving the list of resolutions, delegates created a seven-member central committee to convene future meetings. (Note: The central committee was composed of Johnson, James B. Miller, Stephen F. Austin, Lewis Veeder, Robert Peebles, Wylie Martin, and William Pettis. (Gammel (1898), p. 496.)) The central committee would be based in San Felipe "for the purpose of circulating information of events of importance to the interest of the people". In addition, each municipality was asked to create a committee of correspondence and safety. The sub-committees would keep in close contact with the central committee because "united our strength and resources are more than adequate to our defense in any possible event. Disunited, we may become an easy prey, even to a handful of cowardly invaders".

The convention adjourned on October 6 after unanimously electing Wharton to deliver the resolutions to the state legislature in Saltillo and to the Mexican Congress in Mexico City. Just before the group dispersed, Rafael Manchola, the alcalde (mayor) of Goliad, arrived. He was the only delegate from Goliad and the only Tejano to appear at the convention. Manchola volunteered to accompany Wharton at his own expense—he and other delegates thought the expedition might have more success if a Tejano was also involved. Days later, Austin wrote that "we have just had a convention of all Texas, native Mexicans and foreign settlers—all united as one man".

== Results ==
Following the convention, much of the unrest in Texas subsided. Austin believed the public was calmed simply by having the opportunity to air their grievances. Before the list of concerns could be presented to the state and federal governments, Ramón Músquiz, the political chief, or head, of the Department of Béxar, ruled that the convention was illegal. This type of activism was traditionally forbidden in Texas. (Note: Neither Spain nor Mexico had allowed this type of activism.) The law directed that citizens should protest to their local ayuntamiento (similar to a city council), which would forward their concerns to the political chief. The political chief could then escalate the concerns to the state or federal government. Because the colonists had not followed this process, Músquiz annulled their resolutions. The ayuntamientos at San Felipe, Nacogdoches, Gonzales and Liberty half-heartedly apologized for their participation, and Wharton's mission was cancelled.

The lack of Tejano representation and the San Antonio de Béxar residents' refusal to participate fostered a perception that only newcomers to Texas were dissatisfied. Austin agreed to meet with the political leaders in San Antonio de Béxar to persuade them to support the resolutions. These Tejano leaders, including Erasmo Seguin, largely agreed with the result of the convention but opposed the methods by which the resolutions had been proposed. The Tejano leaders urged patience; Bustamante was still president and would not look favorably on a petition from Texas settlers who had sided with his rival, Santa Anna.

Austin and the Tejano leaders agreed to a compromise. Because San Antonio de Béxar was the seat of the Department of Béxar, its ayuntamiento drafted a petition containing similar language to the convention resolutions. The petition was endorsed by the ayuntamientos at Goliad, San Felipe, and Nacogdoches and then given to Músquiz, who forwarded it to the Mexican Congress in early 1833. Although Músquiz had publicly supported the petition, he secretly included a note to the Coahuila y Tejas governor warning that this might be a precursor to secession.

The political leaders also agreed to Austin's stipulation that if the federal government refused to address the petition within several months, Texas residents would form their own state government, essentially declaring independence from Coahuila, if not from Mexico. The central committee elected by the convention was too impatient to wait long. In late December, the committee called for a March election for delegates to the Convention of 1833. The second convention reiterated some of the previous concerns and took additional steps to declare Texas an independent state, further concerning Mexican authorities, who feared this was a step towards Texas joining the United States.

The Mexican government attempted to address some of the concerns identified by the conventions of 1832 and 1833. In November 1833, part of the Laws of April 6, 1830 were repealed, allowing Americans to immigrate legally to Texas. Several months later, Texas was granted increased representation in the Coahuila y Tejas legislature. Several American legal concepts, such as trial by jury, were introduced to Texas, and English was authorized as a second language. Unimpressed with these compromises, some Texas residents continued to campaign for independent statehood. Rising tensions eventually led to the Texas Revolution, which began in October 1835.

== See also ==
- History of slavery in Texas
- List of Convention of 1832 delegates
- Timeline of the Texas Revolution

== Sources ==
- Barker, Eugene Campbell (1985), The Life of Stephen F. Austin, founder of Texas, 1793–1836, Austin: University of Texas Press, ISBN 0-292-78421-X originally published 1926 by Lamar & Barton
- Davis, William C. (2006), Lone Star Rising, College Station: Texas A&M University Press, ISBN 978-1-58544-532-5 originally published 2004 by New York: Free Press
- de la Teja, Jesus F. (1997), "The Colonization and Independence of Texas: A Tejano Perspective", in Rodriguez O., Jaime E.; Vincent, Kathryn (eds.), Myths, Misdeeds, and Misunderstandings: The Roots of Conflict in U.S.–Mexican Relations, Wilmington, DE: Scholarly Resources Inc., ISBN 0-8420-2662-2
- Edmondson, J.R. (2000), The Alamo Story-From History to Current Conflicts, Plano: Republic of Texas Press, ISBN 1-55622-678-0
- Ericson, Joe E. (2000), The Nacogdoches story: an informal history, Westminster, MD: Heritage Books, ISBN 978-0-7884-1657-6
- Gammel, Hans (1898), The Laws of Texas, 1822–1897, Volume I digital images courtesy of Denton, TX: University of North Texas Libraries, The Portal to Texas History
- Henson, Margaret Swett (1982), Juan Davis Bradburn: A Reappraisal of the Mexican Commander of Anahuac, College Station: Texas A&M University Press, ISBN 978-0-89096-135-3
- Huson, Hobart (1974), Captain Phillip Dimmitt's Commandancy of Goliad, 1835–1836: An Episode of the Mexican Federalist War in Texas, Usually Referred to as the Texian Revolution, Austin: Von Boeckmann-Jones Co.
- Manchaca, Martha (2001), Recovering History, Constructing Race: The Indian, Black, and White Roots of Mexican Americans, The Joe R. and Teresa Lozano Long Series in Latin American and Latino Art and Culture, Austin: University of Texas Press, ISBN 0-292-75253-9
- Morton, Ohland (July 1943), "Life of General Don Manuel de Mier y Teran", Southwestern Historical Quarterly, 47 (1), Texas State Historical Association, archived from the original on 2020-08-09
- Vázquez, Josefina Zoraida (1997), "The Colonization and Loss of Texas: A Mexican Perspective", in Rodriguez O., Jaime E.; Vincent, Kathryn (eds.), Myths, Misdeeds, and Misunderstandings: The Roots of Conflict in U.S.–Mexican Relations, Wilmington, DE: Scholarly Resources Inc., ISBN 0-8420-2662-2
- Winders, Richard Bruce (2004), Sacrificed at the Alamo: Tragedy and Triumph in the Texas Revolution, Military History of Texas Series: Number Three, Abilene: State House Press, ISBN 1-880510-80-4
