= Mexican Texas =

Era of Texan history between 1821 and 1836, when it was part of Mexico

Mexican Texas in 1833

Mexican Texas is the historiographical name used to refer to the era of Texan history between 1821 and 1836, when it was part of Mexico. Mexico gained independence in 1821 after winning its war against Spain, which began in 1810. Initially, Mexican Texas operated similarly to Spanish Texas. Ratification of the 1824 Constitution of Mexico created a federal structure, and what is now Texas was joined with the province of Coahuila to form the state of Coahuila y Tejas.

By 1821, approximately 3,500 settlers were concentrated in San Antonio and La Bahia; settlers were overwhelmingly outnumbered by indigenous tribes despite official efforts. To increase settlement and development, Mexico enacted the General Colonization Law in 1824, which enabled all heads of household, regardless of race, religion or immigrant status, to acquire land in Mexico.

The first empresarial grant had been made under Spanish control to Stephen F. Austin, whose settlers, known as the Old Three Hundred, settled along the Brazos River in 1822. The grant was later ratified by the Mexican government, which also authorized additional, similar concessions for colonization. Twenty-three other empresarios brought settlers to the state, the majority coming from the American South, while only one colony was settled by Mexican nationals, and two by European immigrants.

Under the 1824 Constitution of Mexico, Texas was denied independent statehood and merged into the new state Coahuila y Tejas. The legislature passed the Law of April 6, 1830, which prohibited further immigration by U.S. citizens. The government established several new presidios in the region to monitor immigration and customs practices. Settlers held their first political convention in 1832 to demand that U.S. citizens be allowed to immigrate to Tejas. At the convention of 1833, settlers proposed that Texas become a separate Mexican state. Mexico's new president Antonio López de Santa Anna transformed Mexico's constitution from a federation of states into a centralist dictatorship, forcing the region's settlers to choose between despotism or revolution.

The first violent incident occurred on June 26, 1832, at the Battle of Velasco. On March 2, 1836, Texans declared their independence from Mexico forming the Republic of Texas. Mexico refused to recognize Texas as a new country. The Texas Revolution ended on April 21, 1836, when Santa Anna was taken prisoner by Texan forces following the Battle of San Jacinto.

== Mexican independence ==
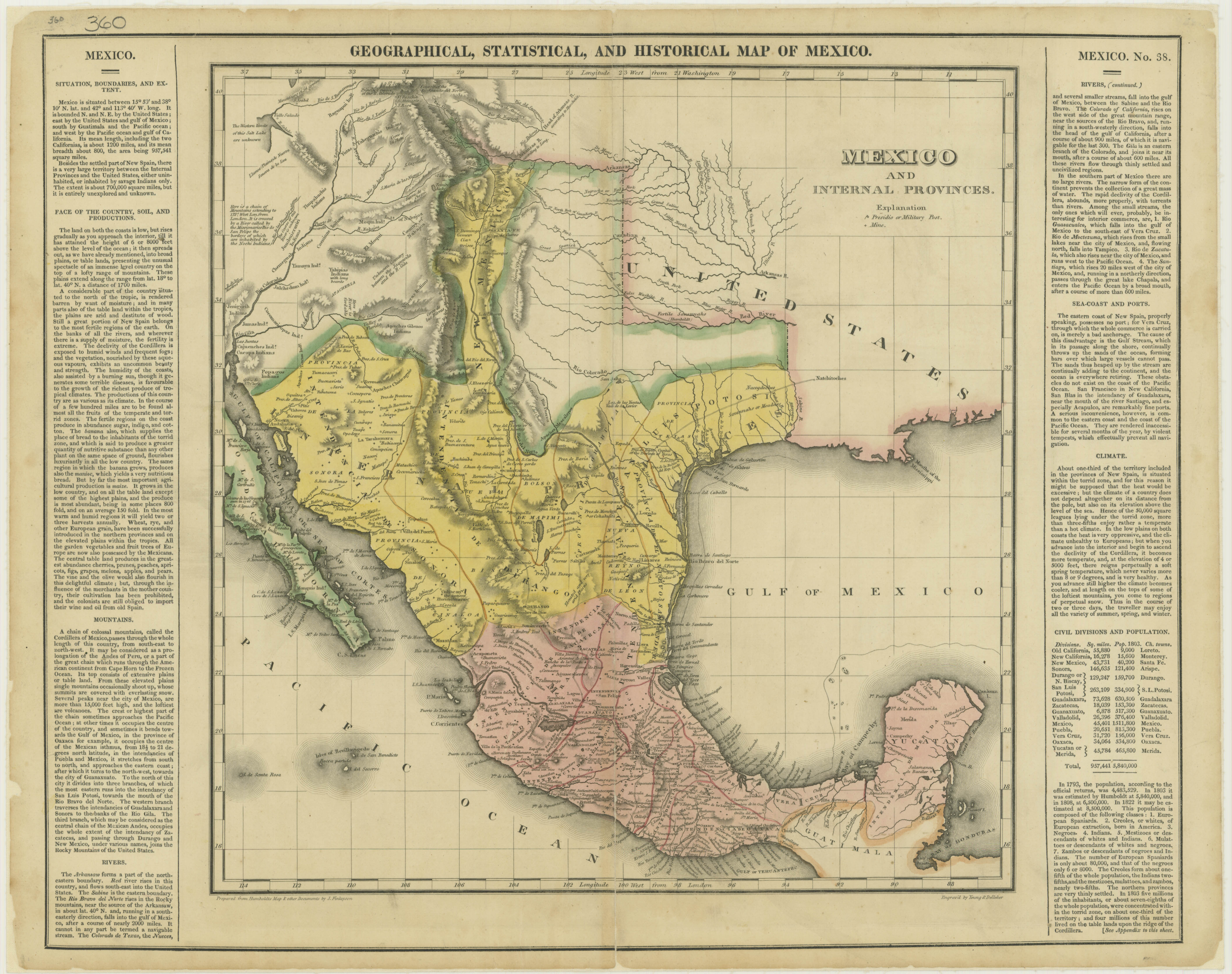
Mexico and its interior provinces in 1822, including the province of Texas

In 1821, Mexico gained independence from Spain after the brutal and destructive Mexican War for Independence. Its territory included much of the former New Spain, including Spanish Texas. The victorious rebels issued a provisional constitution, the Plan of Iguala. This plan reaffirmed many of the ideals of the Spanish Constitution of 1812 and granted equal citizenship rights to all races.

Initially, there was disagreement over whether Mexico should be a federal republic or a monarchy. The first monarch, Agustín I, abdicated in March 1823. The following month the citizens of San Antonio de Bexar established a governing committee for the province of Texas consisting of seven representatives from San Antonio, one from La Bahia, and one from Nacogdoches. In July, a new national provisional government named Luciano Garcia as the political chief of Texas. On November 27, 1823, the people of Mexico elected congressional representatives and set out to create a new constitution. Texas was represented in congress by Erasmo Seguín. A new Mexican constitution was adopted on October 4, 1824, making the country a federal republic with nineteen states and four territories. The constitution was modelled on the constitution of the United States of America, but the Mexican constitution made Roman Catholicism the official, and only, religion of the country.

Because it was sparsely populated, Texas was combined with Coahuila to create the state of Coahuila y Tejas. Texas had originally asked to become a territory if its statehood claim was denied, but after realizing that states controlled their own public lands, while as a territory public land would be controlled by the national government, Seguin chose not to request territorial status. The Congress did allow Texas the option of forming its own state "'as soon as it feels capable of doing so.'" The new state, the poorest in the Mexican federation, covered the boundaries of Spanish Texas but did not include the area around El Paso, which belonged to the state of Chihuahua and the area of Laredo, Texas, which became part of Tamaulipas. The capital of Texas moved from San Antonio to Monclova and then to Saltillo. Along with the states of Tamaulipas and Nuevo León, Coahuila y Tejas was under a unified military organization. With the formation of a new state government, the Texas provincial governing committee was forced to disband. Many Tejanos were reluctant to give up their self-rule.

The 1824 constitution dismantled the mission system, requiring missions more than ten years old to be converted into parishes, while newer missions would be given until 1842 to become secularized. Most of the missions had been secularized before the 1820s, and only Missions Refugio, Espiritu Santo and Rosario were not currently secularized. By 1830, these missions had been converted into parishes, and most of the mission Natives moved to other settlements in Texas. As the missions were secularized, the mission lands were distributed amongst the Natives, who would later be taxed on the profits.

The new Mexican government was bankrupt and had little money to devote to the military. Settlers were empowered to create their own militias to help control hostile Native American tribes. Texas faced raids from both the Apache and Comanche tribes, and with little military support the few settlers in the region needed help. In the hopes that an influx of settlers could control the Indian raids, the government liberalized its immigration policies for the region for the first time, and settlers from the United States were permitted in the colonies for the first time.

== Immigration ==
The Centralist Republic with the separatist movements generated by the dissolution of the Federal Republic. Territory proclaimed its independency Territory claimed by the Republic of Texas Territory claimed by the Republic of the Rio Grande Rebellions

In the late 18th century, Spain had stopped allocating new parcels of land in San Antonio and La Bahia, making it difficult for some families to accommodate their growth. Occupancy rights were granted to people in the northeast part of Texas, but the new residents had no official ownership of the land on which they lived. Just before Mexico achieved independence, Spain reversed its policies and passed a colonization law. Although the law did not state a religious requirement for settlers in Texas, it was understood that Spain's only religion was Catholicism, per the 1812 Constitution. Notably, article 28 of this law prohibited the importation of slaves into Spanish territories, and if brought to the area, they would be freed. Mexico adopted a similar law in 1824. The General Colonization Law enabled all heads of household who were citizens of or immigrants to Mexico to be eligible to claim land. The law did not differentiate among races or social stature, and people who had been granted occupancy rights would be able to claim the land patent for the dwellings. Unlike its predecessor, the Mexican law required immigrants to practice Catholicism and stressed that foreigners needed to learn Spanish. Settlers were supposed to own property or have a craft or useful profession, and all people wishing to live in Texas were expected to report to the nearest Mexican authority for permission to settle. The rules were widely disregarded and many families became squatters.

As soon as the national colonization law was passed, approval for settlement contracts for Texas was the responsibility of the state government in Saltillo. They were soon besieged by foreign speculators wanting to bring colonists into the state. Coahuila y Tejas implemented the federal law in 1825. At this time, about 3500 people lived in Texas, mostly congregated at San Antonio and La Bahia. Under the new law, people who did not already possess property in Texas could claim one square league (4438 acres) of irrigable land, with an additional league available to those who owned cattle. Soldiers were given first choice of land, followed by citizens and immigrants. Empresarios and individuals with large families were exempt from the limit. Those who had owned land under Spanish control were allowed to retain their property as long as they had not fought on the side of the Spanish during the Mexican War of Independence. Immigrants were subject to the same policies as Mexican citizens, and Native Americans who migrated to Texas after Mexican independence and were not indigenous to the area would be treated as immigrants.

Approximately 3420 land grant applications were submitted by immigrants and naturalized citizens, many of them Anglo-Americans. The first group of colonists, known as the Old Three Hundred, arrived in 1822 to settle an empresarial grant that had been given to Stephen F. Austin by the Spanish. The group settled along the Brazos River, ranging from the near present-day Houston to Dallas. Shortly after they arrived, Austin learned that the new Mexican government had not ratified his father's land grant with Spain. He was forced to travel to Mexico City, 1,200 miles (1,931 km) away, to get permission for his colony. During his time in the capitol, Austin impressed various important people in the government by offering to draw a map of Texas, to help remove sediment obstructing navigation of the Colorado River, and by promising to carry out an Indian pacification campaign. On February 18, 1823, ten months after Austin arrived in Mexico City, Agustin I approved his colonization contract. One month later, Agustin abdicated as emperor, and the newly created republican congress nullified all acts of his government, including Austin's colonization contract. Many of Austin's new friends in Mexico praised his integrity before the congress, and his contract was re-approved in mid-April. On his return to Texas in July 1823, Austin established San Felipe de Austin as the new headquarters for his colony.

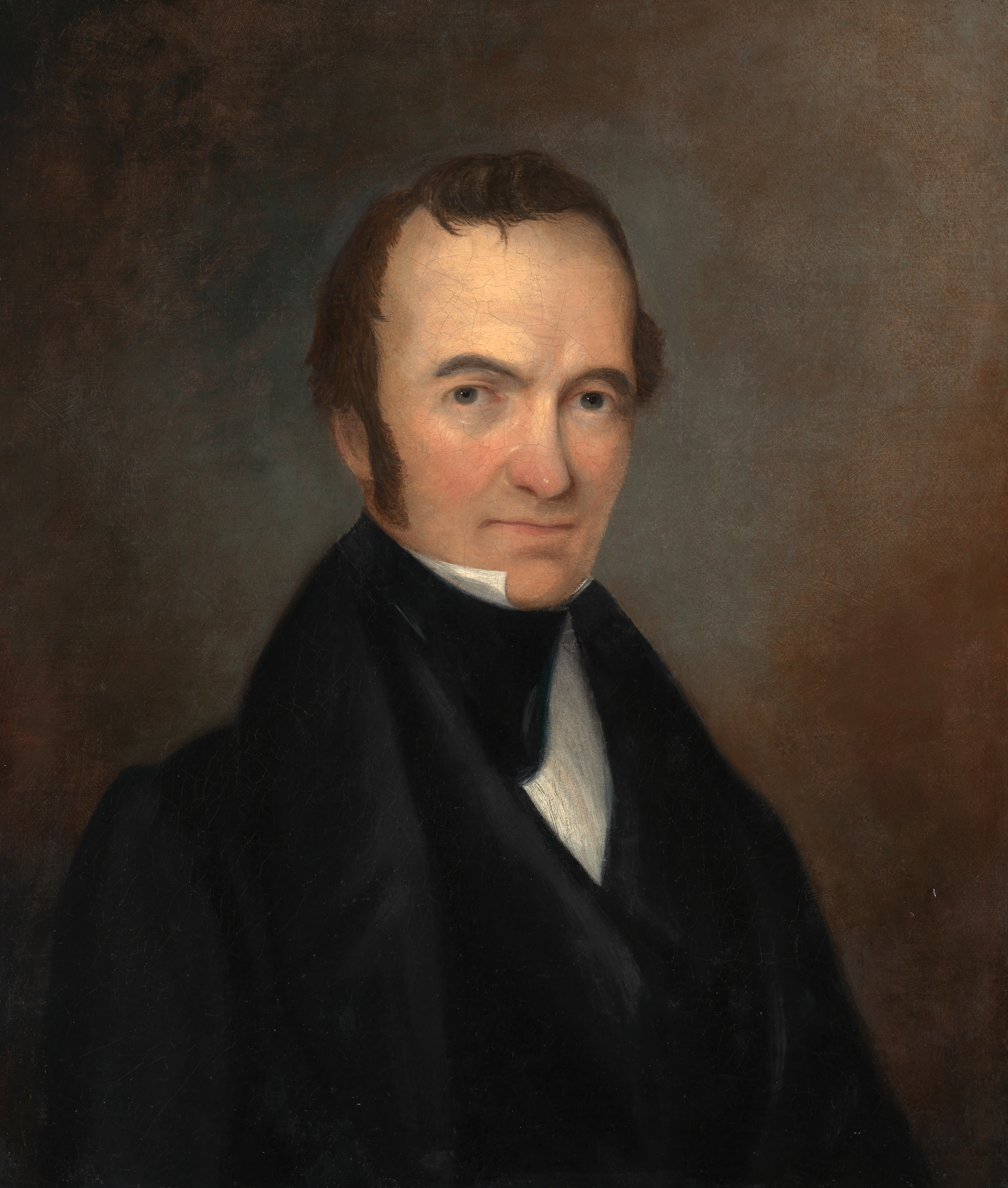
Stephen F. Austin was the first empresario to establish a colony in Mexican Texas.

There was no shortage of people willing to come to Texas. The United States was still struggling with the aftermath of the Panic of 1819, and soaring land prices within the United States made the Mexican land policy seem very generous. In 1827 Austin received a second grant allowing him to settle 100 families along the Old San Antonio Road to Nacogdoches, near what is now Bastrop. The location was chosen at the behest of the Tejanos, who hoped that colonists in that area could help defend against Comanche raids. Austin was later granted permission to resettle 800 other families in Texas. Twenty-three other empresarios also brought immigrants to Texas. Of these, only one of the empresarios, Martín De León settled citizens from within Mexico; the others came primarily from the United States. Many of the Anglo settlers owned slaves. All colonists were expected to become naturalized Mexican citizens, and they were also supposed to follow the state religion. In Austin's colony, the local priest formally converted new arrivals but then allowed them to worship as they pleased.

Austin was granted the rank of lieutenant colonel of the militia, and he was given absolute authority over all justice, excluding the sentencing for capital crimes. To maintain order within his colony, he issued the first Anglo-American law code in Texas. His Instructions and Regulations for the Alcades was issued January 22, 1824. It comprised a penal code and codes of criminal and civil procedure. The instructions authorized the creation of sheriff and constable offices and established a rudimentary court system. It relied on English common law concepts for defining criminal behavior and also established punishments for vices that Austin deemed disruptive, such as gambling, profane swearing, and public drunkenness.

Under the terms of the colonization contracts, the empresarios were responsible for providing security within their lands. In 1823 Austin created a company of men who would patrol his colony and protect the colonists from Native attacks and to defuse internal issues. The initial company, known as Ranger Company, comprised 10 volunteers who served terms of 3–6 months and were paid in land. The men were not uniformed and were not subject to military law or regulation. They were the precursors to the Texas Rangers. After the Karankawa repeatedly attacked the settlers, Austin organized a militia to fight back; they almost annihilated the tribe.

Comanches were a threat to some of the colonies. Green Dewitt began his colony west of Austin's in December 1825. In July 1826 his headquarters, Gonzales, was burned to the ground in a Comanche attack. All but one colonist escaped to San Felipe. They returned to rebuild their colony the following year. For protection, the political chief of the region granted the community a small cannon.

Land speculators flooded into Texas. Colonization laws limited Anglos to only one league of land, but Mexican nationals were in many cases eligible for up to 11 leagues. Anglo speculators would often convince a Mexican national to claim his 11 leagues and then sell the land to the speculator through a power of attorney.

== Rising tensions ==
In 1825, Mexican authorities became concerned with the actions of empresario Haden Edwards in Nacogdoches. Edwards had threatened to confiscate the land of any Mexican already living in the area in which he planned to bring settlers unless the Mexicans could present written deeds to the property. Mexican authorities promptly told him that he did not have the authority to confiscate land and he should honor the claims of the previous settlers. After multiple confrontations, on December 16, 1826, Edwards, his brothers, and 30 settlers issued a declaration of independence and called themselves the Republic of Fredonia. Other empresarios disassociated themselves from Edwards, and Austin sent 250 militiamen to Nacogdoches to help the Mexican forces quell the revolt. Edwards was finally forced to flee Mexican territory.

After hearing reports of other racial issues, the Mexican government asked General Manuel Mier y Teran to investigate the outcome of the 1825 colonization law in Texas. In 1829, Mier y Teran issued his report, which concluded that most Anglo Americans refused to be naturalized and tried to isolate themselves from Mexicans. He also noted that slave reforms passed by the state were being ignored.

Although many Mexican congressmen wanted to abolish slavery, fears of an economic crisis in Veracruz and Acapulco caused by mass emancipation led to a more gradual policy. In 1823, Mexico forbade the sale or purchase of slaves and required that the children of slaves be freed when they reached fourteen. Any slave introduced into Mexico by purchase or trade would also be freed. By 1825, however, a census of Austin's Colony showed 1,347 Anglo-Americans and 443 people of African descent, including a very small number of free African Americans. Two years later the legislature of Coahuila y Tejas outlawed the introduction of additional slaves into the state and granted freedom at birth to all children born to a slave. The new laws also stated that any slave brought into Texas should be freed within six months.

In 1829, slavery was officially outlawed in Mexico. Austin feared that the edict would cause widespread discontent and tried to suppress publication of it. Rumors of the new law quickly spread throughout the area and the colonists seemed on the brink of revolt. The governor of Coahuila y Tejas, Jose Maria Viesca, wrote to the president to explain the importance of slavery to the Texas economy, and the importance of the Texas economy to the development of the state. Texas was temporarily exempted from the rule. On April 6, 1830, Mexican president Anastasio Bustamante ordered Texas to comply with the emancipation proclamation or face military intervention. To circumvent the law, many Anglo colonists converted their slaves into indentured servants for life. Others simply called their slaves indentured servants without legally changing their status. Slaveholders wishing to enter Mexico would force their slaves to sign contracts claiming that the slaves owed money and would work to pay the debt. The low wages the slave would receive made repayment impossible, and the debt would be inherited, even though no slave would receive wages until age eighteen. This tactic was outlawed by an 1832 state law which prohibited worker contracts from lasting more than ten years. A small number of slaves were imported illegally from the West Indies or Africa. The British consul estimated that in the 1830s approximately 500 slaves had been illegally imported into Texas. By 1836, there were approximately 5,000 slaves in Texas.

Exportation in the slave-owning areas of the state surpassed that of the non-slave-owning areas. A survey of Texas in 1834 found that the department of Bexar, which was mostly made up of Tejanos, had exported no goods. The Brazos department, including Austin's colonies and those of Green DeWitt, had exported 600,000 pesos worth of goods, including 5,000 bales of cotton. The department of Texas, which included the eastern settlements, expected to export 2,000 bales of cotton and 5,000 head of cattle.

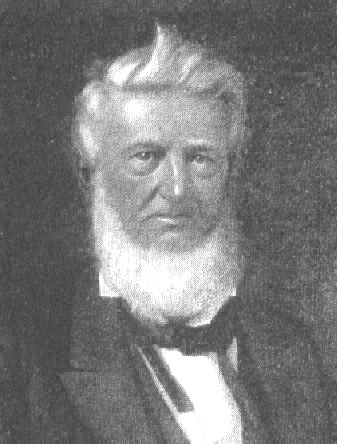
David G. Burnet's empresarial contract was cancelled when he could not bring enough settlers. Burnet later became the interim president of the Republic of Texas.

Bustamante implemented other measures to make immigration less desirable for Anglo-Americans. He rescinded the property tax law, which had exempted immigrants from paying taxes for ten years. He further increased tariffs on goods entering Mexico from the United States, causing their prices to rise. The 1830s laws also brought settlement contracts under federal rather than state control. Colonies that did not have at least 150 inhabitants would be canceled. Among the affected colonies were the Nashville Company run by Sterling C. Robertson and the Galveston Bay and Texas Land Company, run by David G. Burnet, Lorenzo de Zavala and Joseph Vehlein. Finally, he prohibited further immigration to Texas from the United States, although Anglos would still be welcome in other parts of Mexico. The ban and other measures did not stop U.S. citizens from migrating illegally to Texas by the thousands. By 1834, it was estimated that over 30,000 Anglos lived in Texas, compared to only 7,800 Mexicans.

Anglos often viewed the Mexicans as foreigners and intruders. The feeling was often returned; Rafael Antonio Manchola, son-in-law of empresario Martín De León, served as the commander of the presidio at La Bahia from 1828 to 1830 and then as the alcalde of Goliad. He warned the military commander for Texas that

"'No faith can be placed in the Anglo-American colonists because they are continually demonstrating that they absolutely refuse to be subordinate, unless they find it convenient to what they want anyway, all of which I believe will be very detrimental to us for them to be our neighbors if we do not in time, clip the wings of their audacity by stationing a strong detachment in each new settlement which will enforce the laws and jurisdiction of a Mexican magistrate which should be placed in each of them, since under their own colonists as judges, they do nothing more than practice their own laws which they have practiced since they were born, forgetting the ones they have sworn to obey, these being the laws of our Supreme Government.'"

== International issues ==
Many Americans thought the United States had been cheated out of Texas. American land speculators believed they could make fortunes in the vast region of Texas, and American politicians believed Texas could help maintain a balance of power between free and slave states. In 1827, American president John Quincy Adams offered US$1 million for Texas. Mexican president Guadalupe Victoria refused. Two years later, Andrew Jackson increased the United States' offer to $5 million; President Vicente Guerrero again declined to sell.

In July 1829, Mexican authorities had other concerns, as General Isidro Barradas landed 2,700 Spanish troops to the eastern coast of Mexico, near Tampico in an attempt to reclaim the country for Spain. At the request of the government, Austin mustered a local militia to help defend Texas if the invasion were to reach the northern regions of the country. Yucatan governor Antonio López de Santa Anna led a force of Mexican troops to halt the invasion. Barradas surrendered as his troops suffered greatly from tropical diseases, and Santa Anna was hailed as a hero. During the invasion, the Mexican Congress had granted war powers to President Guerrero, making him essentially a monarch. This alarmed the Anglo colonists in Texas, who were accustomed to a separation of powers.

== Precursor to revolt ==
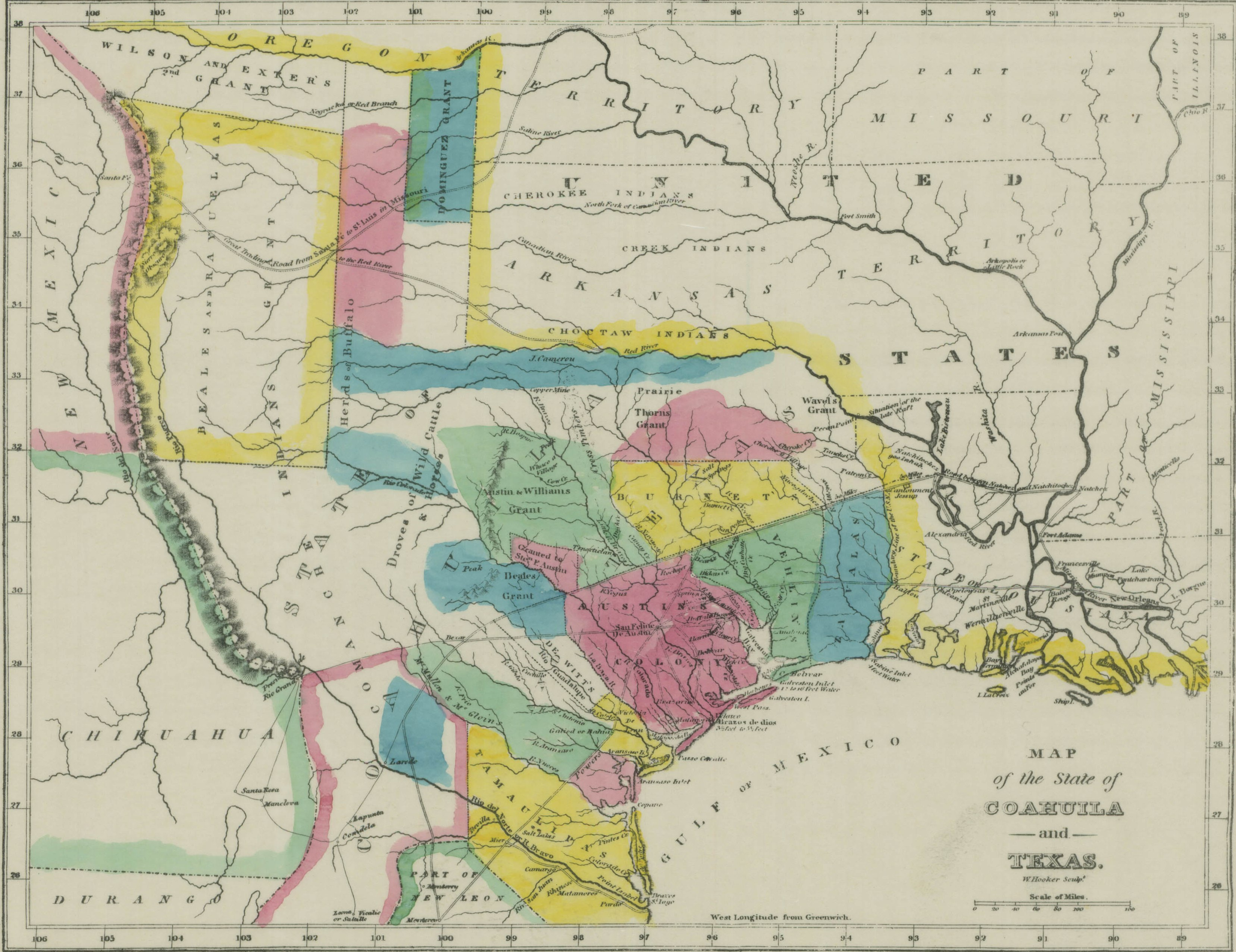
The State of Coahuila and Texas in 1833, showing the major land grants

Mier y Teran's 1828 report had recommended new garrisons in Texas which could oversee the Anglo colonists and encourage Mexicans to resettle in the area. The new garrisons were to be partly staffed by convicts. The first was established along Galveston Bay in 1831 at the site of present-day Anahuac. It became the first port in Texas to collect customs. A second custom port, Velasco, was established at the mouth of the Brazos River, while a third garrison established Fort Teran on the Neches River below Nacogdoches to combat smuggling and illegal immigration.

Mier y Teran further ordered the garrison at Bexar to abandon their fort and create a new presidio. Fort Tenoxtitlán was established in 1830 on the west bank of the Brazos River, 100 miles (161 km) above San Felipe. Shortly after the fort was completed, 50 immigrants from Tennessee arrived in the area under empresario Sterling C. Robertson. The settlers had arrived illegally, as Robertson's contract had been invalidated by Guerrero's 1830 laws. The garrison commander chose not to expel them, instead sending to Mexico for advice. Three months later he received instructions to expel the settlers immediately. He chose not to do so, allowing the Robertson's Colony to be saved. The fort closed in 1832. After having received no replacements or supplies, the commander finally ordered all of the soldiers to return to San Antonio.

Anahuac was placed under the control of Colonel Juan Davis Bradburn. Bradburn enforced the 1830 laws strictly, angering many colonists. He forbade the state commissioner from granting property titles to squatters and insisted on enforcing the law freeing any slave who set foot in Mexican territory. He and his men also confiscated settlers goods for their own personal wealth. This angered many of the Anglos, believing that their rights under the Mexican Constitution of 1824 were being violated. In 1832, local men organized a militia, supposedly to protect the settlement from Indian attacks, although all Indians in the area were peaceful. Mexican law forbade residents from creating militias, so Bradburn arrested the ringleader, Patrick C. Jack. Citizens were very angry. In Brazoria, residents held a town meeting to decide what to do. William H. Wharton complained that there was little support within Austin's colony to oppose Bradburn with military force; he and other advocates of armed conflict felt that their opposition from other settlers was as deep as that of the Mexican soldiers in the area. Bradburn eventually agreed to release Jack, and tensions cooled for a brief period.

In May 1832, Bradburn received a letter, ostensibly from a friend, warning that 100 armed men were stationed 40 miles (64 km) away, intent on reclaiming runaway slaves held by Bradburn. When Bradburn realized that the letter was a hoax, he arrested William Barret Travis for questioning. He intended to send Travis to Matamoros for a military trial on charges of attempted insurrection, with the goal being separation from Mexico. Conviction on this charge would certainly lead to Travis's execution. The settlers were outraged that the arrest did not require a warrant, a statement of charges, or trial by jury. Most were unfamiliar with Mexican law and assumed that the United States Bill of Rights still applied to them. Settlers attacked the Anahuac garrison to free Travis in an event that became known as the Anahuac Disturbances.

Additional settlers had gathered in Brazoria to transport several cannon to aid the group in Anahuac. Colonel Domingo de Ugartechea, who led the garrison at Velasco, at the mouth of the Brazos River, refused to allow the ship carrying the cannon to pass. On June 26, settlers initiated the Battle of Velasco; Ugartechea surrendered the following day.

Several days later, Colonel Jose de las Piedras arrived from Nacogdoches to assist Bradburn. He removed Bradburn from his command, and the settlers dispersed.

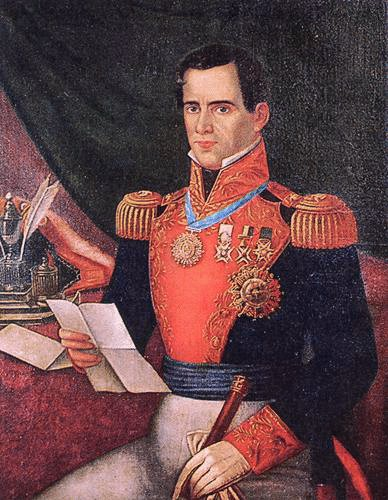
Antonio Lopez de Santa Anna

In 1832, Antonio Lopez de Santa Anna led an insurrection against Mexican president Bustamante. Although most of the Mexican Army supported the Bustamante administration, this led to a small civil war. Many of the Anglo settlers sided with Santa Anna and followed General José Antonio Mexía, who led soldiers in Texas against Bustamante. Mexia removed the commander at Matamoros from his post. In October, 55 delegates from Texas communities attended the Convention of 1832 in San Felipe. The delegates drafted three petitions to the Congress of Mexico. They wished for an annulment of Article 11 of the colonization law of 1830 (which prohibited foreign settlement as well as customs reform), recognition of squatters as valid immigrants, and a separate state for Texas.

On December 19, 1832, the Bexar Remonstrance was issued to the Mexican Congress. It legally proclaimed the grievances that the population of Texas had suffered under the centralist style Mexican government. It addressed such issues as improper protection against Indian attacks and poor pay for militia, insufficient local and legislative representation, forbidding of immigration from the United States, lack of schools and funding for education, and various violations of the repudiated republican style Constitution of 1824. On April 1, 1833, a second convention at San Felipe asserted that " the evils and injustice to Texas" included "the practical deprivation of Texas of a voice in the government"

Santa Anna was elected the president of Mexico on January 19, 1833. A resulting second convention was held that year in April. This one, attended by recent arrivals such as Sam Houston, appointed a commission to draft a constitution for a new Mexican state of Texas and selected delegates to represent Texas before the federal government. Austin was chosen to deliver the proposed constitution to Santa Anna's government in Mexico City. Although Austin pointed out that Texas had been given permission to form a separate state and had now grown to 46,500 inhabitants, the political chief of Bexar warned the government that the Anglos might be proposing separate statehood as part of a plan to join with the United States. Austin was arrested on November 21, 1833, on suspicion of treason. Austin was imprisoned for about a year. Santa Anna decided to do away with the Mexican Constitution of 1824 and became a dictator. At this point, Austin switched from promoting peace to supporting separation from Mexico.

The Mexican government attempted to address some of the Texans' concerns. Article 11 was repealed on November 21, 1833, allowing American immigrants to again flow into Texas. Five months later, Coahuila y Tejas separated Texas into three departments, San Antonio-Bexar, Brazos, and Nacogdoches, with political chiefs for each department and more representation in the state legislature. Furthermore, trial by jury was introduced, and English was authorized as a second language. An Anglo American, Jefferson Chambers, was appointed superior circuit judge of Texas in 1835 and extensions were granted for settlement contracts that had not met their conditions for the number of settlers. Six English-speaking Texan communities were elevated to municipalities.

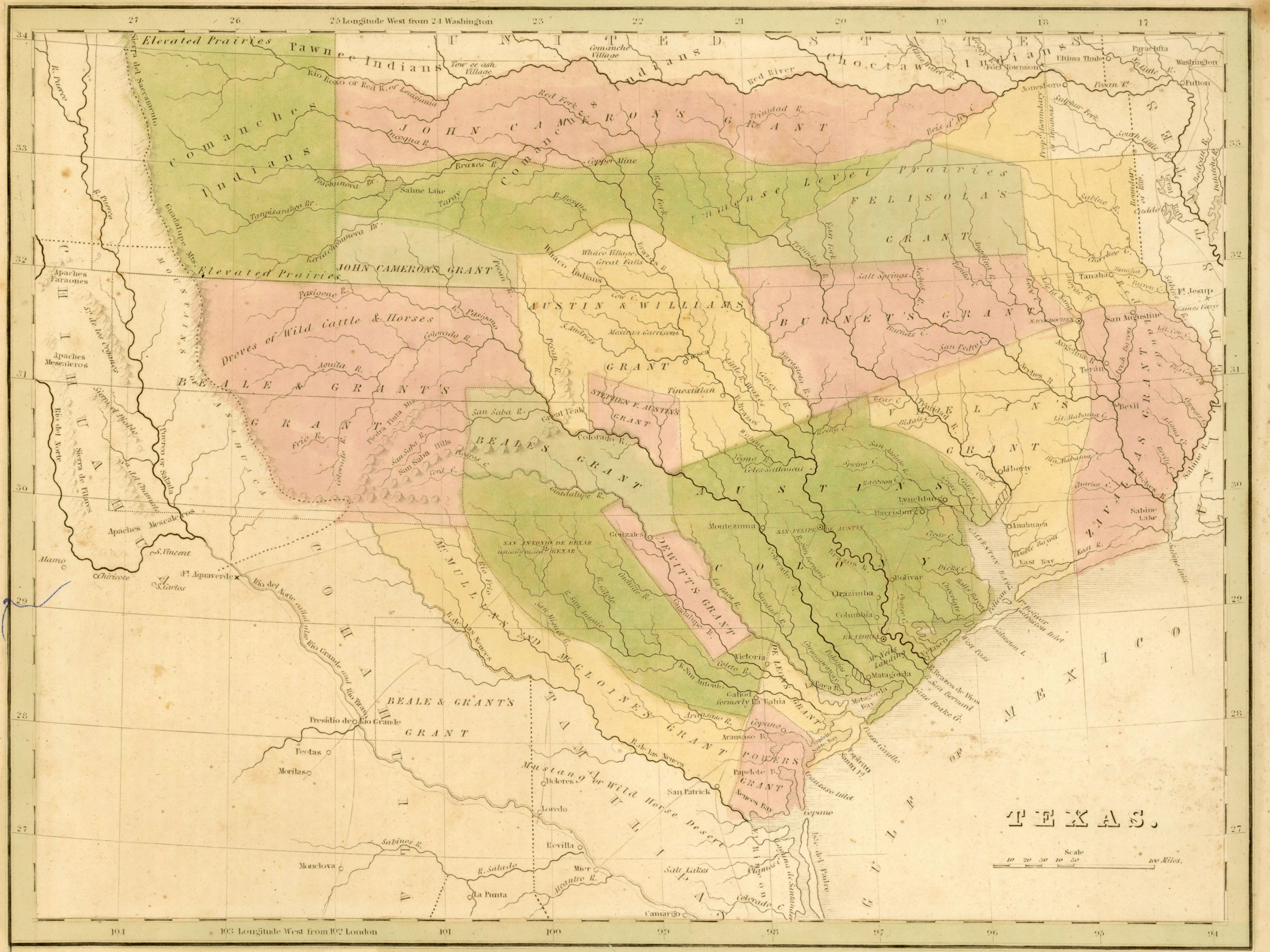
Thomas Gamaliel Bradford's map of Texas in 1835

In March 1833, the capital of the state was transferred from Saltillo to Monclova. The following year, centralists began urging Santa Anna to overturn the federal system and introduce centralism. Some legislators believed that centralism would be the only way to retain Texas, as newspapers in the United States continued to make statements about the forthcoming annexation of Texas. When the national congress attempted to centralize the nation, a civil war ensued. As fighting erupted, Saltillo declared that Monclova had been illegally made the state capitol and selected its own governor. Texans in Saltillo recommended establishing a provisional government in Bexar during the unrest to strengthen the autonomy of Texas. Juan Seguin, political chief of Bexar, called for a town meeting to create a government but was forced to postpone it when news arrived of approaching Mexican troops.

By the end of the year, however, Santa Anna began to exhibit centralist tendencies, and in 1835 he revoked the Constitution of 1824 and began consolidating his power. In various parts of the country federalists revolted, and in May 1835 Santa Anna brutally crushed a revolt in Zacatecas; over 2,000 noncombatants were killed. The federalists, including Agustín Viesca, the governor of Coahuila y Tejas, were afraid that Santa Anna would march against Coahuila after subduing the rebels in Zacatecas, so they disbanded the state legislature on May 21, 1835, and authorized the governor to set up an office in a different part of the state. Viezca was arrested as he traveled to San Antonio. Under the pretext of being angry over Viezca's imprisonment the people of Anahuac organized a resistance under Travis. Their real grievance was that the two-year grace period on tariffs had ended and the Anahuac customs office had reopened. When Viezca escaped and reached Texas, no one recognized him as governor. As protests spread across Texas, Mexican officials increasingly blamed the settlers from the United States for the discontent.

== Texas Revolution ==
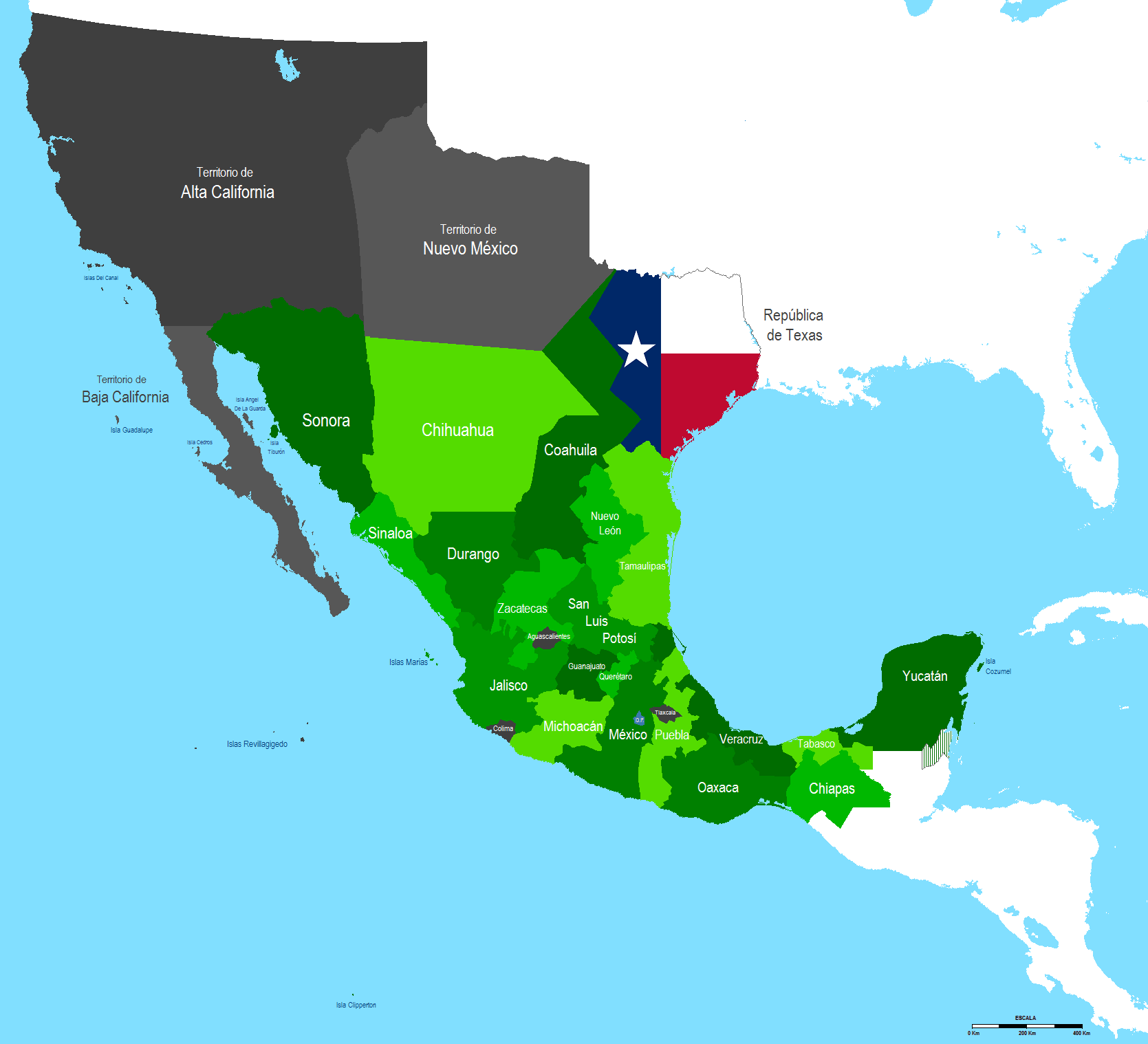
Map of México in 1836.

In an effort to secure his freedom, in January 1835 Austin had published his Exposition to the Public Regarding the Affairs of Texas. In this document, he explained that Texas wanted to be a separate state, not an independent nation. He discussed the grievances against the Texas justice system and justified the conventions of 1832 and 1833 as "'an exercise of the right to petition that belongs to every free people'". He was finally released from prison and had returned to Texas, by August. He changed his mind in prison about the future of Texas and issued a call to arms, announcing that Texas should be "'forever free of any Mexican control'".

After the Mexican Congress elected Antonio López de Santa Anna as President of Mexico in 1833, he appointed Valentín Gómez Farías as his vice president and turned over much of the governing of Mexico to him. However, the Vice President began implementing reforms, particularly impacting the Mexican Army and the Catholic Church. These reforms angered the powerful centrist forces, who urged Santa Anna to abandon his semi-retirement. Santa Anna agreed and led the reaction against liberalization, forcing Gómez Farías and his Federalist supporters, including Mexican General José Antonio Mexía, to flee into exile in the United States. Some went to New Orleans, where they planned to resist the Centralist government.

Although the United States government remained officially neutral in the Mexican struggle between Santa Anna's Centralists and Gomez Farias' Federalists, there was much political sympathy favoring the separation of Texas from Mexico. A number of men, known as "filibusters", were attracted to militia-type organizations such as the New Orleans Greys, preparing to go fight for Texas independence. General Mexia soon found financing in New Orleans and began raising an expedition to attack the important Mexican port of Tampico. He persuaded influential people in New Orleans that seizing the port would aid the Texian cause. However, the "Tampico Expedition" that he began on November 6, 1835, failed.

In 1835 Juan Seguin, Plácido Benavides, Manuel Leal, and Salvador Flores began raising companies of volunteers from the San Antonio and Victoria areas to support the federalist cause. By the end of the year over 100 Tejanos had joined the Federal Army of Texas to defend the Constitution of 1824 against the centralists. The political chief of the Nacogdoches region told the militias to take arms against the Mexican troops in July 1835 and asked the rest of the citizens to form a volunteer army. "Texas committees" in cities such as New Orleans and New York City mustered volunteers and began sending an army and money to assist the Texas colonists in their fight. Austin commanded the militias, while Sam Houston was placed in charge of the volunteers. The first violent incident occurred on October 2 at the Battle of Gonzales.

The Consultation met in November to discuss the reasons for the revolt. The Consultation denounced centralism and organized a provisional state government based "'on the principles of the 1824 Constitution'". The following month, San Antonio surrendered to the Anglos, giving the rebels a great deal of military equipment. Some Texans traveled to the United States seeking aid. Although they were denied a loan, they managed to heavily advertise the availability of land in Texas, ensuring that more volunteers would come to fight.

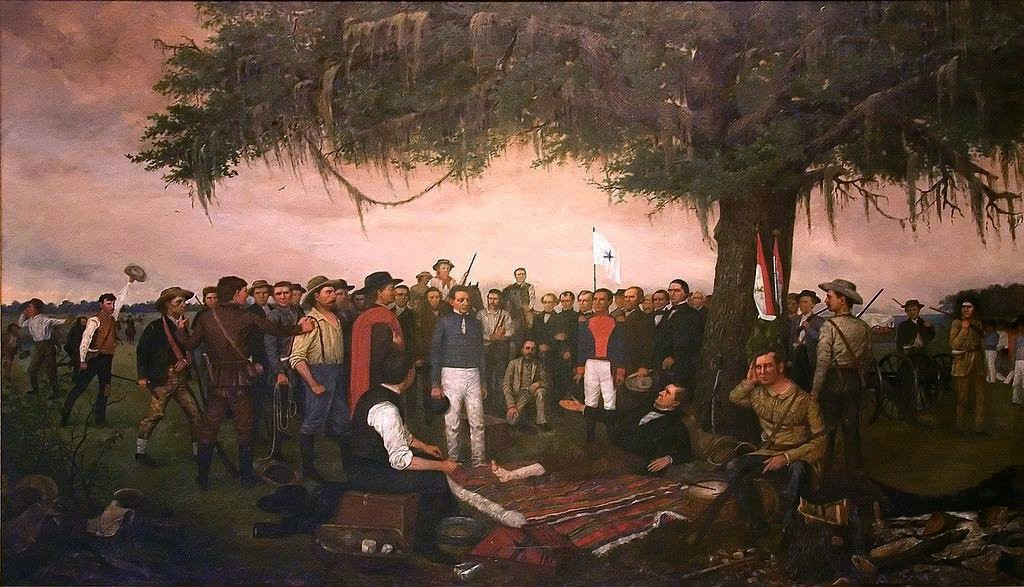
The painting "Surrender of Santa Anna" by William Henry Huddle shows the Mexican general Santa Anna surrendering to a wounded Sam Houston.

Texas formally declared independence at Washington-on-the-Brazos on March 2, 1836. The revolt was justified as necessary to protect basic rights and because Mexico had annulled the federal pact. The colonists maintained that Mexico had invited them to move to the country and they were determined "to enjoy 'the republican institutions to which they were accustomed in their native land, the United States of America.'" The declaration did not acknowledge that Mexico had attempted to incorporate some of their demands. The new Texas constitution specifically allowed slavery and said no free person of African descent could reside in the new country without Congress's consent. Many of the Tejanos left the fight after the declaration of independence as they were disappointed with the growing anti-Mexican rhetoric. Only Seguin's company remained in the Texian Army.

The war ended with the Battle of San Jacinto on April 21, 1836, with the birth of the Republic of Texas. Santa Anna was taken prisoner, and the Mexican troops were forced to withdraw south of the Rio Grande. It is remarkable that Sam Houston was able to keep the Texans from killing Santa Anna since he had slaughtered the men of the Alamo and Goliad. In the ensuing Treaties of Velasco, Santa Anna promised he would convince the Mexican government to recognize Texan independence. Santa Anna was released to the United States, which then turned him over to Mexico. The newly appointed president of Mexico (Anastasio Bustamante) and the Mexican Congress both rejected the Treaties of Velasco, declaring that because he had signed them under duress, they were null and void. Santa Anna later said, "I did promise to try to get a hearing for the Texas Commissioners, but this in itself did not bind the government to receive them."

== See also ==
- Illegal immigration to Mexico

== Sources ==
- Anderson, Gary Clayton (1999). The Indian Southwest, 1580–1830: Ethnogenesis and Reinvention. Norman: University of Oklahoma Press. ISBN 0-8061-3111-X.
- Barr, Alwyn (1996). Black Texans: A history of African Americans in Texas, 1528–1995 (2nd ed.). Norman: University of Oklahoma Press. ISBN 0-8061-2878-X.
- Barr, Alwyn (1990). Texans in Revolt: the Battle for San Antonio, 1835. Austin: University of Texas Press. ISBN 0-292-77042-1. OCLC 20354408.
- Brown, Johny Henry (1893). History of Texas : from 1685 to 1892, volume 1. St. Louis: L. E. Daniell. OCLC 2650999.
- Davis, William C. (2006). Lone Star Rising. College Station: Texas A&M University Press. ISBN 978-1-58544-532-5. originally published 2004 by New York: Free Press
- del la Teja, Jesus (1991). A Revolution Remembered: The Memoirs and Selected Correspondence of Juan N. Seguin. Austin, TX: State House Press. ISBN 0-938349-68-6.
- de la Teja, Jesus F. (1997). "The Colonization and Independence of Texas: A Tejano Perspective". In Rodriguez O., Jaime E.; Vincent, Kathryn (eds.). Myths, Misdeeds, and Misunderstandings: The Roots of Conflict in U.S.–Mexican Relations. Wilmington, DE: Scholarly Resources Inc. ISBN 0-8420-2662-2.
- del la Teja, Jesus (2010). Tejano Leadership in Mexican and Revolutionary Texas (Elma Dill Russell Spencer Series in the West and Southwest). US: Texas A&M University Press. ISBN 978-1-60344-166-7.
- Edmondson, J.R. (2000). The Alamo Story-From History to Current Conflicts. Plano, TX: Republic of Texas Press. ISBN 1-55622-678-0.
- Hardin, Stephen L. (1994). Texian Iliad – A Military History of the Texas Revolution. Austin: University of Texas Press. ISBN 0-292-73086-1. OCLC 29704011.
- Henson, Margaret Swett (1982). Juan Davis Bradburn: A Reappraisal of the Mexican Commander of Anahuac. College Station: Texas A&M University Press. ISBN 978-0-89096-135-3.
- Horton, David M.; Turner, Ryan Kellus (1999). Lone Star Justice: A Comprehensive Overview of the Texas Criminal Justice System. Austin, TX: Eakin Press. ISBN 1-57168-226-0.
- Lozano, Ruben Rendon (1985). Viva Texas: The Story of the Tejanos, the Mexican-born Patriots of the Texas Revolution. San Antonio, TX: The Alamo Press. ISBN 0-943260-02-7.
- Menchaca, Martha (2001). Recovering History, Constructing Race: The Indian, Black, and White Roots of Mexican Americans. The Joe R. and Teresa Lozano Long Series in Latin American and Latino Art and Culture. Austin: University of Texas Press. ISBN 0-292-75253-9.
- Meyer, Michael C. (1995) [1979]. The course of Mexican History (5th ed.). New York: Oxford University Press. ISBN 0195089790.
- Miller, Edward L. (2004). New Orleans and the Texas Revolution. Texas A&M University Press. ISBN 1-58544-358-1.
- Nofi, Albert A. (1992). The Alamo and the Texas War of Independence, September 30, 1835 to April 21, 1836: Heroes, Myths, and History. Conshohocken, PA: Combined Books, Inc. ISBN 0-938289-10-1.
- Vazquez, Josefina Zoraida (1997). "The Colonization and Loss of Texas: A Mexican Perspective". In Rodriguez O., Jaime E.; Vincent, Kathryn (eds.). Myths, Misdeeds, and Misunderstandings: The Roots of Conflict in U.S.–Mexican Relations. Wilmington, DE: Scholarly Resources Inc. ISBN 0-8420-2662-2.
- Ward, Forrest E. (October 1960). "Pre-Revolutionary Activity in Brazoria County". Southwestern Historical Quarterly. 64 (2).
- Weber, David J. (1982). The Mexican Frontier, 1821-1846: The American Southwest Under Mexico. Albuquerque: University of New Mexico Press. ISBN 978-0-8263-0603-6.
- Williams, David A. (1997). Bricks Without Straw: A Comprehensive History of African Americans in Texas. Austin, TX: Eakin Press. ISBN 1-57168-041-1.
