= Jared Groce =

American planter, slaveowner and settler

Jared Ellison Groce (October 12, 1782, Halifax County, Virginia – November 20, 1836) was an American planter, slaveowner and settler. He was one of the first American settlers in Texas, making him one of the Old Three Hundred.

== Early life and family ==
Groce's great-grandfather, Samuel Groce, arrived in West Point, Virginia, from Basingstoke, England in 1722 at the age of 20. He settled in Kenbridge, Virginia in 1727 and farmed tobacco with slaves, and married Elsa Murray, an Ulster Scots woman from Carrickfergus. In the 1750s, Groce's grandfather moved to Halifax County, Virginia.

An article in the Southwestern Historical Quarterly states that Jared Groce's father and uncle emigrated from England c. 1772. During the American Revolutionary War, Groce's father enlisted in George Washington's army, while his uncle supported the British; such was the uncle's anger that the two men never saw each other ever again, and the father changed the spelling of his surname from Gross to Groce.

In 1802, at the age of 20, Jared Groce left the family home to invest in land in South Carolina. On August 29, 1804, he married Mary Ann Waller, a member of the prominent Waller family. Shortly after, he purchased a plantation in Lincoln County, Georgia. Already a slaveowner, he had to purchase many more to work his plantation. The couple had three sons and one daughter: Leonard Waller, Edwin (who drowned while he was young), Sarah Ann, and Jared Ellison Jr. His wife died on either November 7, 1813, while visiting her relatives, or in 1814. He married her oldest sister Ann Weller in 1814 and had two more children. Groce established Fort Groce in Alabama. Ann died in 1818.

At the end of 1821, Groce heard about Steven F. Austin plans to establish a colony in Texas. He packed up 50 wagons and 90 slaves and reached the Brazos River in January 1822 with his family.

== Mexico and Texas ==
The Mexican government gave him title to ten leagues of land (approximately 44,280 acres) on July 29, 1824.

=== Bernardo Plantation ===
Constructed on the east bank of the Brazos River, where there was a cross between the Coushatta Trace and the river, four miles south of what is now Hempstead, the Bernardo Plantation was born. Bernardo was the largest and one of the first plantations in Texas to grow and gin cotton up until the Civil War.

Upon arrival, about a third of his 90 slaves built a basic, 30-by-30-foot cabin out of cottonwood logs. The cabin consisted of four large downstairs rooms, two rooms upstairs, and a house-length gallery. By the end of 1822, the main home was finally finished. The name "Bernardo" supposedly came from Bernardo de Gálvez, an old Spanish governor. Slave quarters were also built.

Towards the end of 1822, Groce planted his first crop, cotton, and was possibly the first to do so in Austin's colony. The first couple of cotton crops failed, but later on, a single successful crop became the catalyst for a huge boom in cotton farming in Texas. Cotton was a major contributor to the Texas economy for many decades. In 1825, he built one of the original cotton gins in Texas.

In light of his great success, Groce had a dairy house and a small cabin built for the resident doctor in town. The original log cabin had six beds moved into it for guests. Jared Groce and the plantation became a popular stopping destination, as he became known for his welcoming family and demeanor.

He played an active role in colonizing and managing the Austin colony. In 1824, he was the head of a committee to petition the congress of Mexico to allow for protection of the acknowledgement of the property of slave ownership in Texas. That same year, Groce wrote to his friends and family in other states declaring Texas to be the promised land and inviting everyone to come see for themselves.

=== Anti-independence stance ===
Groce was openly against the Fredonian Rebellion (December 21, 1826 – January 23, 1827), the first attempt of Texan settlers to throw off Mexico's control. To show his opposition, he donated ferries, wagons, teams, supplies, and even some of his slaves to Mexican Colonel Mateo Ahumada, who was marching on Nacogdoches, Texas. Seeing as how the Mexican government was treating him very well (giving him land and ownership benefits), he believed that seceding would only harm his business and personal interests. He only confirmed this when he was selected to be a delegate from the District of Viesca (now Milam County), at the Convention of 1832, and opposed all ideas of seeking independence from Mexico. Following the convention, he and several other opposing members drafted a bill for tariff reduction in hopes that it would reduce the number of people wanting to secede.

The following year at a secondary convention, he made his case again about the disadvantages of separating from Mexico. He was very adamant about his position for a couple of years, but he eventually relented.

=== Groce's Retreat ===
In 1833, Groce divided up his estate among his children and relocated some miles north to Wallace Prairie (now Grimes Country) to get away from the malaria-prone region. He took 20 slaves with him and established Groce's Retreat. This became his main home for the second half of his life. The place sat on three acres on the highest point of the plots. William Fairfax Gary, a guest there at one point, described the multitude of houses on the plantation as "numerous but small and crowded".

The town of Retreat is two miles east of Groce's Retreat and was established in 1851.

=== Role in Texas independence ===
By 1836, he fully supported the revolution. No one really understood why he switched his position, as he was a man of strong morals and personal opinions. There were some theories floating around that the Mexican government had learned that he had purchased some land in other states in a non-respectable manner and they were planning to take back some of the land they had given him years before, when he originally moved to Texas. Others speculated that he had made enemies within the Mexican government and wanted to cut ties between them before they could harm his business and personal interests. Whatever the reasoning, he changed his tune and became a major contributor to the revolutionary efforts and a major financial contributor to the costs of war as well. General Sam Houston even wrote about him in his journal, commending Groce for his contributions and efforts, even stating that they most likely would not have been able to succeed without his help and generosity.

Beginning on the night of March 2, 1836, a draft of the Texas Declaration of Independence was written by a committee led by George Childress in only 24 hours at Groce's Retreat. It was signed the next day in Washington-on-the-Brazos. David G. Burnet, interim President of Texas, and his cabinet stayed at Groce's Retreat between March 18 and March 21, making it the temporary capital of the Republic of Texas. Towards the end of the fight for independence, Groce's Retreat was one of many places under consideration to become the permanent capitol.

In April, General Sam Houston and his army stayed across the Brazos from Bernardo Plantation for two weeks. Groce's son, Leonard Waller Groce, the owner of Bernardo Plantation, supplied the general and his troops with provisions, shelter, and medical attention for the duration of their stay.

Groce died on November 20, 1836, and was buried at Bernardo Plantation.

== Groce family papers ==
The Groce family papers are a group of documents belonging to the Groce family. They are accessible online through the University of Texas Libraries.
