= Rafael Manchola =

Rafael Antonio Manchola (died about 1833) was a politician and military officer in Mexican Texas. He twice served as commandant of Presidio La Bahía. He served two terms in the legislature of the state of Coahuila y Tejas. At his behest, the community which had grown outside the fort was renamed Goliad and elevated in status to a villa. During his legislative service, Manchola also negotiated official boundaries for the colony of his father-in-law, Martín De León, and had a commissioner appointed to grant official titles to the settlers in that colony. After returning home, Manchola became the alcade of Goliad and initiated a resolution–then considered illegal– supporting the Constitution of 1824 and Mexican President Antonio Lopez de Santa Anna. He briefly attended the Convention of 1832 and volunteered to accompany William H. Wharton in journeying to Mexico City to request separate statehood for Texas. The mission was postponed, and Manchola died of cholera in late 1832 or early 1833.

== Personal life ==
Rafael Manchola descended from an aristocratic Spanish family. He married María de Jesús de León, fourth daughter of empresario Martín De León. Manchola and his wife had one daughter.

== Military and business careers ==
Manchola was a Mexican military officer stationed at Presidio La Bahía in Mexican Texas. He served as the commandant of the presidio from 1826–27 and then in 1831. Manchola owned a large ranch, and his cattle brand was one of the first registered in the Goliad and Victoria area.

Manchola was very supportive of his father-in-law's colony and became involved in several disputes that de Leon had with fellow empresario Green DeWitt. The Mexican government had made an error when granting DeWitt lands on which to establish a colony and included part of the land that had already been assigned to de Leon and his settlers. The land disputes may have contributed to a warning that Manchola gave to the Mexican military commander for Texas:

"'No faith can be placed in the Anglo-American colonists because they are continually demonstrating that they absolutely refuse to be subordinate, unless they find it convenient to what they want anyway, all of which I believe will be very detrimental to us for them to be our neighbors if we do not in time, clip the wings of their audacity by stationing a strong detachment in each new settlement which will enforce the laws and jurisdiction of a Mexican magistrate which should be placed in each of them, since under their own colonists as judges, they do nothing more than practice their own laws which they have practiced since they were born, forgetting the ones they have sworn to obey, these being the laws of our Supreme Government.'"

== Politics ==
In 1829 and 1830, Manchola served as one of two delegates to represent the area around La Bahía in the legislature of the state of Coahuila y Tejas. One of his first acts was to propose a renaming of the town from which he was elected. The town which had grown around the presidio was also known as La Bahía (the bay), despite the fact that neither presidio nor town were currently located on or near a bay. Manchola proposed that the town be renamed after Father Hidalgo, who had played a great role in the Mexican War of Independence. Rather than name the town Hidalgo, though, Manchola created an anagram, "Goliad". The request was approved on February 4, 1829. At the same time, the town was elevated to a villa, making it a small capital town with jurisdiction over nearby areas. During his term he also protested to the governor, Agustin Viesca, insisting that the Mexican government enforce the September 1823 order to secularize all missions that had been operating for more than 10 years. Manchola prepared detailed documentation of the histories of the missions in his area and incidents in which settlers accused the mission Indians of wrongdoing. Manchola wanted the missions to be disbanded, with the lands sold to settlers. Viesca soon ordered the political chief at San Antonio de Bexar to enforce the secularization order, which was finally implemented in 1830.

Manchola also successfully helped the settlers in his father's colony to resolve title issues. Under his prodding, the legislature finally set official boundaries for de Leon's colony and appointed a commissioner to issue titles to the families which had already settled in that area. This resulted in the creation of a new municipality for the area around Guadalupe Victoria, the major city in de Leon's colony.

After his legislative term ended, Manchola was elected alcade (mayor) of Goliad. Manchola was a firm believer that Texas deserved separate statehood within Mexico. In August 1832, at the request of his friend, influential empresario Stephen F. Austin, Manchola used his influence with the local council to persuade them to make an official declaration of support for Mexican President Antonio Lopez de Santa Anna and the Mexican Constitution of 1824. At the time, such a declaration was illegal. Soon, however, the governor of Coahuila y Tejas and other communities within the state made similar declarations.

In October 1832, delegates met at the Convention of 1832 to write a constitution for a proposed state of Texas. Manchola reached the convention shortly after the delegates approved the document and had elected William H. Wharton to bring it to Mexico City. Manchola volunteered to accompany Wharton at his own expense—he and other delegates thought the expedition might have more success if a Tejano was also involved. Their departure was delayed after Austin and the political leaders in San Antonio de Bexar expressed reservations about the timing of the request. Within a few weeks, a cholera epidemic reached Texas. Manchola likely died during the epidemic.

== See also ==
- List of Convention of 1832 delegates
