= List of Convention of 1832 delegates =

The Convention of 1832 was the first political gathering of colonists in Mexican Texas.

On August 22, the ayuntiamento (city council) at San Felipe de Austin (the capital of Austin's colony) called for each district to elect five delegates. Sixteen communities chose delegates. The two municipalities with the largest Tejano population, San Antonio de Béxar and Victoria, refused to participate. The majority of the elected delegates were known as relatively even-tempered. Many known agitators, such as James Bowie and William B. Travis, were defeated. Tejanos did not have a large presence at the convention, largely due to the boycott by the Béxar and Victoria municipalities. Convention organizers invited several prominent Tejanos from these towns to attend, but all declined.

On October 1, 1832, 55 delegates met in San Felipe de Austin; attendance may have been diminished due to the short notice. Over the next six days, the delegates adopted a series of resolutions requesting changes in the governance of Texas. Historian Eugene Campbell Barker suggests that the discussions would likely not have concluded so swiftly unless the delegates had done "considerable preparation before the meeting".

After approving the list of resolutions, delegates created a 7-member central committee to convene future meetings. (Note: The central committee was composed of Johnson, James B. Miller, Stephen F. Austin, Lewis Veeder, Robert Peebles, Wylie Martin, and William Pettis. (Gammel (1898), p. 496.)) The central committee would be based in San Felipe "for the purpose of circulating information of events of importance to the interest of the people".

The convention adjourned on October 6 after unanimously electing William H. Wharton to deliver the resolutions to the state legislature in Saltillo and to the Mexican Congress in Mexico City. Just before the group dispersed, Rafael Manchola, the alcalde (mayor) of Goliad, arrived. He was the only delegate from Goliad and the only Tejano to appear at the convention. Manchola volunteered to accompany Wharton at his own expense—he and other delegates thought the expedition might have more success if a Tejano was also involved. Days later, Austin wrote that "we have just had a convention of all Texas, native Mexicans and foreign settlers – all united as one man".

== Committees ==
- Appeal of immigration ban (Immigration)
- Reduction of tariffs (Tariffs)
- Land business east of San Jacinto (Land business)
- Indian affairs (Native land claims)
- Regulate Customs affairs while no inspector (Customs)
- Schools
- Independent statehood (Statehood)
- Organize militia (Militia)
- English as a second language (English)
- Central Committee proposal
- Appoint a surveyor-general for Texas

== Delegates ==
Name	District	Committees	Notes
John Austin	Victoria	Customs (chair); Militia (chair); Native lands Statehood; Tariffs	Presided over convention prior to election of president
Stephen F. Austin	San Felipe de Austin	Finance; Surveyor-General	Elected President of the convention Supervised translation of documents Took a short leave of absence due to indisposition Named to Central Committee
Thomas D. Beauchamp	Snow River	English	
John M. Bradley	Tenahaw	Native lands Statehood	
Henry S. Brown	Gonzales	Statehood	
Samuel Bruff	Alfred	Schools	
Jesse Burnham	Alfred	Indian affairs Statehood	
George Butler	Tenahaw	Statehood	
Nestor Clay	Hidalgo	Customs; Indian affairs Militia; Statehood	
John Connell	Mill Creek	Statehood	
Silas Dinsmore	Mina	Statehood	
Archelaus Bynum Dodson	San Jacinto	Statehood	
Samuel C. Douglass	Mill Creek	Statehood	
William K. English	Tenahaw	Land business	
Frederick Foy	Tenahaw	Land business	
Jacob Garrett	Ayish Bayou	Land business	
Jared E. Groce	Viesca (Note: Viesca was bounded by the Brazos River and the San Jacinto and Trinity Rivers, and the Atascocita and Old San Antonio Roads.)	English; Finance; Militia; Statehood; Tariffs (chair)	
Joshua Hadley	Viesca		
Warren DeWitt Clinton Hall	Liberty	Finance	
Wyatt Hanks	Ayish Bayou	Land business Militia; Native lands Statehood	
Jonas Harrison	Tenahaw	Finance; Immigration; Land business Native lands Surveyor-General	
Thomas Hastings	Nacogdoches	Schools	
William R. Hensley	Alfred	Indian affairs (chair); Statehood	
Hyman Hertz	Nacogdoches	Statehood	
Benjamin Holt	Sabine	Finance (chair); Land business Statehood	
Absalom Hyer	Sabine	Statehood	
Ira Ingram	Mina	English; Central (proposed) (chair)	
Elijah Isaacs	Snow River	Land business Statehood	
Patrick Churchill Jack	Liberty	Immigration; Land business	
Frank W. Johnson	San Felipe de Austin	Militia	Elected Secretary; Named to Central Committee; Recommended as Surveyor-General
James Kerr	Linnville	Central (proposed); English; Finance	
William D. Lacy	Alfred		
Luke Lesassier	San Felipe de Austin	Immigration; Schools (chair); Statehood; Surveyor-General	Served as temporary chairman while Stephen Austin was indisposed
James Looney	Snow River		
Joseph K. Looney	Lavaca	Central (proposed); Militia; Tariffs	
Samuel Looney	Snow River	Indian affairs Statehood	
Rafael Manchola	Goliad		Manchola arrived after the convention adjourned. The only Tejano to participate in any way, he volunteered to accompany Wharton to deliver the petitions to Mexico City.
Wylie Martin	San Felipe de Austin	Customs; Native lands Statehood	Named to Central Committee
Donald A. McDonald	Ayish Bayou		
William McFarland	Ayish Bayou	Customs; Land business Militia; Native lands Schools; Statehood	
Hugh McGuffin	Lavaca		
George B. McKinstry	Victoria	Central (proposed); Tariffs	
William Menifee	Lavaca	Schools; Statehood	
Eli Mercer	Victoria	Statehood	Granted a leave of absence for "extreme indisposition"
James Morgan	Liberty	Finance; Land business Statehood; Tariffs	
Jesse Parker	Sabine		
George F. Richardson	San Jacinto	Statehood	
William Robinson	Viesca	Statehood	
Charles Sayre	Victoria	Tariffs (chair)	
Clay C. Stinett	Gonzales	Indian affairs Statehood	
Philip A. Sublett	Ayish Bayou	Land business Native lands	
George Sutherland	Lavaca	Customs; Immigration; Militia; Statehood	
Charles Stanfield Taylor	Nacogdoches	English; Finance; Land business Native lands (chair); Statehood; Tariffs	Nominated for secretary of the convention (defeated)
Alexander Thompson	Hidalgo	Statehood	
Claiborne West	Liberty	Statehood	
William H. Wharton	Victoria	Immigration (chair); Statehood	Nominated for president of the convention (defeated); Wrote petition requesting independent statehood Elected to deliver the petition to Mexico City
Robert Wilson	San Jacinto	Central (proposed)	
David Wright	Alfred		

== Sources ==
- Barker, Eugene Campbell (1985), The Life of Stephen F. Austin, founder of Texas, 1793–1836, Austin, TX: University of Texas Press, ISBN 0-292-78421-X originally published 1926 by Lamar & Barton
- Davis, William C. (2006), Lone Star Rising, College Station, TX: Texas A&M University Press, ISBN 978-1-58544-532-5 originally published 2004 by New York: Free Press
- Ericson, Joe E. (2005), They Came to East Texas 500–1850: Immigrants and immigration patterns, Heritage Books, ISBN 978-0-7884-3327-6
- Gammel, Hans (1898), The Laws of Texas, 1822-1897, Volume I. digital images courtesy of Denton, TX: University of North Texas Libraries, The Portal to Texas History.
- Huson, Hobart (1974), Captain Phillip Dimmitt's Commandancy of Goliad, 1835–1836: An Episode of the Mexican Federalist War in Texas, Usually Referred to as the Texian Revolution, Austin, TX: Von Boeckmann-Jones Co.
