= Illegal immigration to Mexico =

Illegal immigration in Mexico has occurred at various times throughout history, especially in the 1830s and since the 1970s. The largest source of illegal immigrants in Mexico are the impoverished Central American countries of Guatemala, Haiti, Honduras, and El Salvador and African countries like Democratic Republic of Congo, Cameroon, Guinea, Ghana and Nigeria. The largest single group of illegal immigrants in Mexico is from the United States.

== Texas in 19th century ==
In the 1820s, people from the Northern and the Eastern United States entered Mexico illegally. Mexico had legal immigration by empresario contacts to create a buffer between Mexico and the growing United States. At first, Mexico tried to convince Mexicans to move into Texas. However, Texas was dominated by the territorially-defensive, indigenous Comanche. Mexican families did not want to move to Texas and risk their families' lives. Mexico then offered cheap land to Anglos from the United States to help displace indigenous peoples on its frontier. The legal immigrants had to agree to live under the Mexican Constitution of 1824. Mexican Texas was bordered by the US frontier areas of Louisiana and Arkansas and had the most settlement by American illegal immigrants. When Mexico realized that illegal immigration was out of control, it attempted to shut it down. Mexican Texas had a population of 3,000 illegal immigrants by 1823, mostly from the Southern United States or Appalachia. By 1825, Mexico and the Coahuila y Tejas territory legalized immigration if the settlers converted to Roman Catholicism and did not own slaves. However, the settlers broke their promises, and their population expanded to 7,000 and did not assimilate to Mexican culture.

Immigration from the United States was banned by the Law of April 6, 1830 under the First Mexican Republic in an attempt to stop large numbers of white Americans from setting up cotton plantations using slave labor, which had recently been banned in Mexico. A cotton price spike and the economic success of plantations in Mississippi, which also used slaves, created strong economic incentives for illegal immigration.

By 1835, American immigration increased to 1,000 per month. Mexican President Santa Anna got rid of the Mexican Constitution of 1824. His strict dictatorship led to tensions and eventually the outbreak of the Texas Revolution. The Republic of Texas declared its independence from Mexico in 1836, and would be integrated into the United States in 1845.

== Migration Law of 2011 ==
Prior to May 2011, Mexico's immigration policy was regulated by the highly-strict General Law of Population of 1970, which had been portrayed in a hypocritical light in comparison to immigration policies by the US states, such as Arizona or Alabama. However, on May 24, 2011, Mexican President Felipe Calderón signed the new and much more liberal Migration Law. One chamber of the Mexican Congress had unanimously approved the migration bill on February 24 and the other on April 29. Some of the most significant principles of the new law included new rights for migrants. It guarantees that foreigners and Mexican nationals will receive equal treatment under Mexican law and decriminalizes undocumented immigration by reducing it to an administrative infraction, punishable with a fine of up to 100 days of the minimum wage.

Under the equality principle all immigrants, regardless of status, nationality, or ethnicity, are granted the right to education and healthcare and are entitled to due process. Elements aimed at promoting family unity were also added. Moreover, before the government takes action (such ad by deportation) with respect to migrant children and other vulnerable individuals (women, seniors, the disabled, and victims of crime), their specific needs must be prioritized, and adequate services must be provided. Migrants are also granted judicial rights that they had been denied, such as the right to due process. In addition, the law also calls for establishing a Center for Trust Evaluation and Control, which will be charged with the task of training and certifying immigration personnel in hopes of curtailing corrupt practices. All Institute of Migration officials are to meet the same standards as the rest of the country's security agencies. Government officials found to be violating the law are now subject to penalties, including fines and imprisonment.

== General Law of Population ==
With the Mexican government's intent to control migration flows and attract foreigners able to contribute to economic development, the new migration law simplifies foreigners' entrance and residence requirements. Firstly, the law replaces the two large immigration categories (immigrant and non-immigrant) with the categories of "visitor" and "temporary resident." The status of "permanent resident" is maintained. Both categories incorporate over 30 different types of foreigners [distinguished visitor, religious minister, etc.), each with its own stipulations and requirements to qualify for entry and staying. Under the new law, the requirements are simplified by basically differentiating foreigners who are allowed to work and those who are not. The law also expedites the permanent resident application process for retirees and other foreigners. For the granting of permanent residency, the law proposes using a point system, based on factors such as level of education, employment experience, and scientific and technological knowledge. The specifics for the points system were established in Articles 124 to 127 of the law's regulations, which were published on September 28, 2012.

According to Article 81 of the law and Article 70 of its regulations, only immigration officials may conduct immigration procedures, but the Federal Police may assist under the request and the guidance of the Institute of Migration. Verification procedures may not be conducted in migrant shelters run by civil society organizations or by individuals who engage in providing humanitarian assistance to immigrants.

== Migrant shelters ==
Migrant shelters in Mexico are mainly non-profits and faith based. Migrant shelters respond to migrants' need for safety and resources. They are built along migrant routes so that people can stop a while and recuperate. These shelters provide temporary housing and services such as access to food, clothing, and the internet.

Migrant shelters also serve as housing for migrants who are applying for refugee status in Mexico. The Mexican Commission for Refugee Assistance (COMAR) takes 45 business days to process submitted applications. This agency has been and still is understaffed in comparison to the large number of migrants. So COMAR has struggled to keep up with the processing of applications, leading to growing numbers of migrants seeking shelter.

Different shelters offer different services and assume different approaches to their work with migrants. There are shelters that focus on providing a space to rest and recharge for the journey; others that organize travel groups and share information about the safest routes; and others that discourage their clients from continuing their journey. Smugglers, coyotes, and cartel members are aware of the locations of the shelters so staying in them can become a risk of further victimization for some migrants.

Most migrant shelters in Mexico are faith-based organizations. Some studies show many migrants feel more comfortable in shelters that are faith-based and which provide spiritual counseling.

== Immigration raids ==
In October 2004, the Hechos newscast of TV Azteca reported that the National Institute of Migration in Mexico had raided strip clubs and deported foreigners working there without proper documentation. In 2004, the INM deported 188,000 people at a cost of US$10 million.

== Origin ==
=== Cubans ===
Illegal immigration from Cuba through Cancún tripled from 2004 to 2006.

=== United States ===
Americans are the largest group of illegal immigrants in Mexico. The Mexican government has been accused of hypocrisy both from its own citizens (for refraining from enforcing its illegal immigration laws upon US citizens), and from the United States, for its history of criticising the US government's highly punitive illegal immigrantion policy while, prior to 2011, having an enforcement record considered by some as being comparatively more severe.

=== Guatemala ===
In 2006 Newsweek magazine profiled the issue of Guatemalan immigrants illegally entering Mexico and stated that Mexican President Vicente Fox urged for the United States grant legal residency to millions of undocumented Mexican immigrants, but Mexico had granted legal status to only 15,000 undocumented immigrants. Additionally, Newsweek found that at coffee farms in the Mexican state Chiapas, "40,000 Guatemalan field hands endure backbreaking jobs and squalid living conditions to earn roughly [US]$3.50 a day," and some farmers "even deduct the cost of room and board from that amount." The National Institute of Migration estimated that 400,235 people crossed the Guatemala–Mexico border illegally every year and that around 150,000 of them intended to enter the United States. The illegal immigration from Mexico's southern neighbors is proving to be a headache for both Mexico and the United States. The US has seen an increase in illegal immigration from Central America, but Mexican migration has fallen to about net zero. Most Central Americans in Mexico and the United States hail from Honduras, El Salvador, or Guatemala, with a small number from Nicaragua. Amnesty international indicates that 60% of women migrants are sexually assaulted in transit via Mexico to the United States.

In December 2018 Jacklyn, a 7 year old Guatemalan, died in custody at US Customs after crossing illegally from Mexico to the US.

== Public opinion ==
A 2019 survey sponsored by The Washington Post and the Mexican newspaper Reforma gathered information on public opinion regarding illegal immigration to Mexico. It was conducted on July 9 to 14, 2019 for 1,200 Mexicans adults across the country in 100 election districts by way of face-to-face interviews. According to the survey, Mexicans are profoundly frustrated with illegal immigrants after a year of increased migration through their country from Central America. The survey demonstrates that only 7% of Mexicans think that Mexico should provide residency to Central American immigrants, and another 33% support allowing them to temporarily stay in Mexico while the United States comes to a decision regarding their admittance. However, 55% say that illegal immigrants should be deported to their home countries. The findings disprove the perception that Mexicans support the influx of Central Americans. The data results instead suggest that Mexicans oppose the migrants traversing through their country, a sentiment that was shared by numerous supporters of US President Donald Trump. The survey found that more than 6 in 10 Mexicans think that migrants pose a burden on their country because they take jobs and benefits that should belong to Mexicans.

The face-to-face survey was conducted for Mexican adults after a dramatic increase in Mexico's immigration enforcement after an agreement had been made in June with the US. Fewer of half of Mexicans were aware of the June agreement, and 34% of those opposed it, 59% supported it. Several analysts had predicted the base of Mexican President Andrés Manuel López Obrador to be disillusioned when he agreed to heighten Mexico's immigration enforcement. However, the poll instead suggested that his new approach lost very little of López Obrador's popularity. He maintained a strong 70% approval rating eight months after he had assumed office. As many as 54% stated that he was standing up for the interests of Mexico in his dealings with the United States and on immigration. Furthermore, 51% of Mexicans support using the country's recently formed National Guard to repel the migration of illegal immigrants to Mexico. He launched Mexican National Guard, which has played a major part in the intensifying of immigration enforcement. Also, 53% of Mexicans voiced their trust in the national guard, two thirds of Mexicans stated that they would like the national guard to be in their city, and 45% reported that they felt safer with the domestic force.

In July 2019, the governors of three northern Mexican states (Coahuila, Nuevo León, and Tamaulipas) signed a statement announcing that they could not accept any more migrants. Coahuila Governor Miguel Ángel Riquelme Solís stated, "The number [of migrants] that the federal government is talking about is impossible for us to deal with." Guatemalans were set be the largest group of migrants apprehended at the United States border in 2019. That would be the very first time in modern history that Mexicans do not make up the largest migrant group by nationality.

The poll found that only 2% of Mexicans deemed immigration their country's most important problem, and 55% stated that it was insecurity. Another 9% mentioned corruption, the same for unemployment, 7% stated the economy, and 4% states that poverty, the same thinking that political and social problems were Mexico's primary concerns.

== See also ==
- Immigration to Mexico
- Law of Mexico
- Illegal immigration to the United States
