= William H. Wharton =

Politician, Republic of Texas

William Harris Wharton
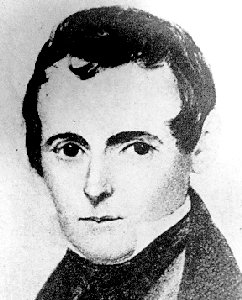

Republic of Texas Senator
- In office 1836–1839

Personal details
- Born: April 27, 1802 Virginia
- Died: March 14, 1839 (aged 36) Hempstead, Texas
- Spouse: Sarah Ann Groce
- Profession: Senator, soldier, minister

William Harris Wharton (April 27, 1802 – March 14, 1839) was an American colonist, diplomat, senator and statesman in early Texas.

== Early life and family ==
Wharton was born in Virginia to William and Judith Harris Wharton. Following the deaths of his parents, he was raised by his uncle, Jesse Wharton in Nashville. He attended Vanderbilt University, as a member of its first class, then known as the University of Nashville. He was admitted to the Tennessee bar in 1826.

== Texas Revolution ==
Wharton served as a delegate to the Convention of 1832 from the District of Victoria. The convention elected him as one of the representatives delivering the resolutions to the legislature of Coahuila y Tejas in Saltillo and to the Mexican Congress in the Federal District.

Following that convention's unsuccessful attempts to form a new state separate from Coahuila y Tejas, Wharton served as president of the follow-up Convention of 1833 and openly advocated complete independence from Mexico, in contrast to the moderate view held by native Texans and others like Stephen F. Austin. Wharton later served as a delegate from the Columbia district to the Texas Consultation of 1835.

Wharton entered military service during the Texas Revolution, serving as a colonel and judge advocate general. He participated in the siege of San Antonio de Béxar in the fall of 1835. Shortly thereafter, he was appointed as one of three commissioners to the United States to secure aid for the Texians.

== Senator ==
After the revolution resulted in the formation of the Republic of Texas in 1836, Wharton supported Austin's unsuccessful candidacy for president, which was instead won by Sam Houston. Wharton served as a member of the new republic's senate from the District of Brazoria in 1836.

In November, President Houston appointed Wharton as minister to the United States, hoping to secure political recognition and possible annexation. On March 3, 1837, the United States Senate voted to recognize Texas' independence. Returning to Texas in 1837 by sea, Wharton was captured by a Mexican ship and carried to Matamoros, where he was imprisoned. He escaped (allegedly by wearing a nun's habit) and returned to Texas to be re-elected to the Texas Senate in 1838.

Wharton introduced the "Lone Star" flag to Congress on December 28, and may have designed it.

== Personal life ==
Wharton moved to Mexican Texas, where on December 5, 1827, he married Sarah Ann Groce, the daughter of wealthy landowner, Jared Ellison Groce. The Wharton family briefly returned to Nashville, where their only child was a born, a son, John A. Wharton (1828–1865). Wharton returned to Texas with his family and established a farm known as Eagle Island Plantation.

== Death ==
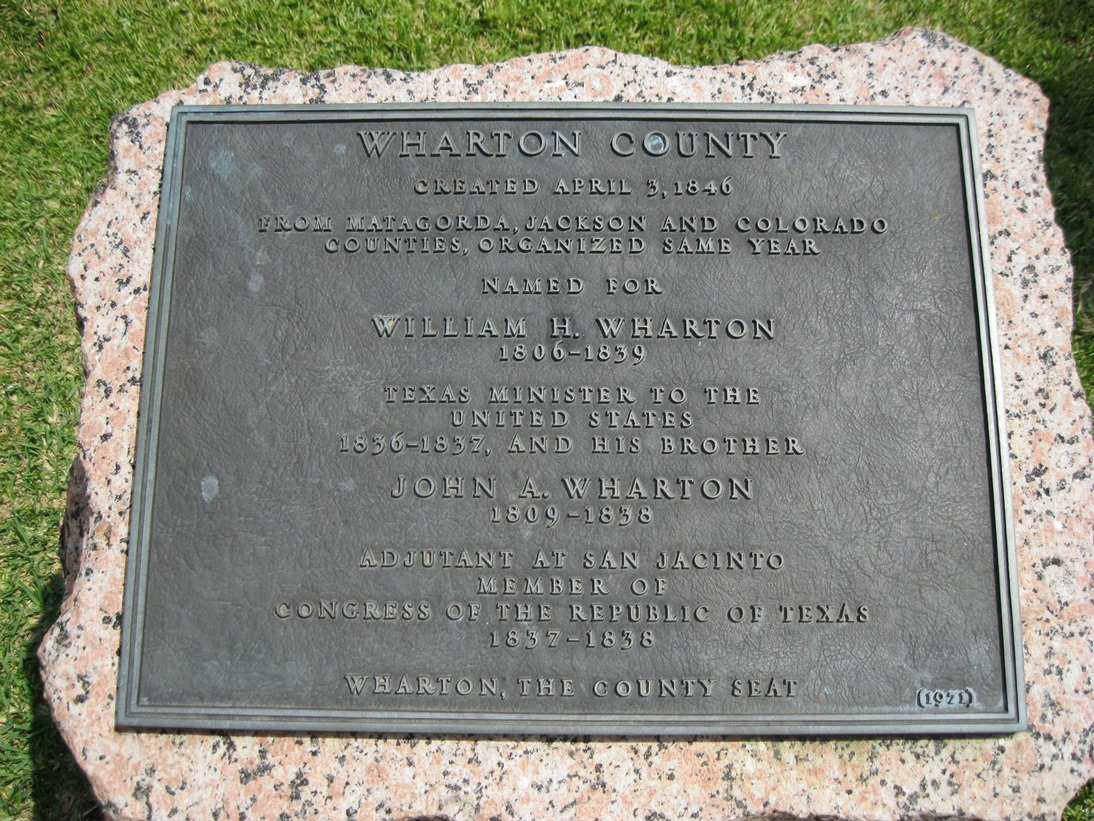
Wharton County, Texas was named for William H. Wharton and his brother John A. Wharton

Wharton accidentally shot and killed himself while dismounting from his horse near Hempstead in Waller County, Texas, on March 14, 1839. He was buried at Rest wood Memorial Park in Clute, Texas.

== Legacy ==
Both Wharton County, Texas, and its county seat, Wharton, were named for him and his brother John Austin Wharton (1806–1838), who was likewise a statesman of the Republic of Texas.

== See also ==
- List of Convention of 1832 delegates
- Republic of Texas–United States relations

== Bibliography ==
- Davis, William C. (2004). Lone Star Rising: The Revolutionary Birth of the Texas Republic. Free Press. ISBN 9780684865102.

Diplomatic posts
Preceded by post created	Republic of Texas Commissioner to the United States; 1835–1836 served alongside Stephen F. Austin and Branch T. Archer	Succeeded by unique post for support of Texas independence
Political offices
Preceded by office created	Republic of Texas Senator from Brazoria District; 1836 and 1837–1839 died in office 1839	Succeeded by Anson Jones
