= Law of April 6, 1830 =

Mexican law to curb U.S. immigration to Mexican Texas

Law of April 6, 1830 was issued because of the Mier y Terán Report to counter concerns that Mexican Texas, part of the border state of Coahuila y Tejas was in danger of being annexed by the United States. Immigration of United States citizens, some legal, most illegal, had begun to accelerate rapidly. The law specifically banned any additional American immigrants from settling in Mexican Territory, which included California and Texas, along with the areas that would become Arizona, parts of Colorado, Nevada, New Mexico, and Utah. It also stopped the import of more slaves into Texas.

== Background ==
In 1827 and 1829, the United States offered to purchase Mexican Texas.

Both times, President Guadalupe Victoria declined to sell part of the border state. After the failed Fredonian Rebellion in eastern Texas, the Mexican government asked General Manuel Mier y Terán to investigate the outcome of the 1824 General Colonization Law in Texas. In 1829, Mier y Terán issued his report, which concluded that most Anglo-Americans tried to isolate themselves from Mexicans. He also noted that slave reforms passed by the state were being ignored.

== Terms ==
Almost all of Mier y Terán's recommendations were adopted in a series of laws passed on April 6, 1830, under President Anastasio Bustamante.

The law explicitly banned any further immigration from the United States to Texas and any new slaves. Settlement contracts were brought under federal rather than state control, and colonies that did not have at least 150 inhabitants would be canceled. Provisions of the law were designed to encourage Mexican citizens to move from the interior to Texas. Mexicans who agreed to relocate to Texas would get good land, free transportation to Texas, and some financial assistance. Convicts would be sent to Texas to build fortifications and roads to stimulate trade.

Other parts of the law were targeted at those already living in Texas. Bustamante rescinded the property tax law, which had a 10-year tax exemption for immigrants. He further increased tariffs on goods entering Mexico from the United States, causing their prices to rise.

== Aftermath ==
The ban and other measures did not stop US citizens from migrating to Texas by the thousands, and by 1834, it was estimated that over 30,000 Anglos lived in Texas, compared to only 7,800 Mexicans.

Regarding slavery, influential settler Stephen F. Austin, who reasoned that the success of his colonies needed slave labor and the economics it produced to lure more whites to the area, used his relationships to get an exemption from the law. Therefore, slavery remained in Texas until the end of the American Civil War.

== See also ==
- General Colonization Law, 1824
- Immigration to Mexico
- Illegal immigration to Mexico

== Sources ==
- Edmondson, J.R. (2000), The Alamo Story-From History to Current Conflicts, Allen, TX: Republic of Texas Press, ISBN 1-55622-678-0
- Henderson, Timothy J (2007), A glorious defeat: Mexico and its war with the United States, Macmillan, ISBN 978-0-8090-6120-4
- Menchaca, Martha (2001), Recovering History, Constructing Race: The Indian, Black, and White Roots of Mexican Americans, The Joe R. and Teresa Lozano Long Series in Latin American and Latino Art and Culture, Austin, TX: University of Texas Press, ISBN 0-292-75253-9
- Vazquez, Josefina Zoraida (1997), "The Colonization and Loss of Texas: A Mexican Perspective", in Rodriguez O., Jaime E.; Vincent, Kathryn (eds.), Myths, Misdeeds, and Misunderstandings: The Roots of Conflict in U.S.–Mexican Relations, Wilmington, DE: Scholarly Resources Inc., ISBN 0-8420-2662-2
- Weber, David J. (1982), The Mexican frontier, 1821-1846: the American Southwest under Mexico, University of New Mexico Press, ISBN 978-0-8263-0603-6
