= Erasmo Seguín =

American postmaster

Juan José María Erasmo de Jesús Seguin

Postmaster of the City of San Antonio
- In office 1807–1835

87th Mayor of San Antonio
- In office 1820–1821

Quartermaster of Presidio San Antonio de Béxar
- In office 1825–1835

Personal details
- Born: May 26, 1782 San Antonio de Béjar, Spanish Texas, New Spain (now Texas, U.S.)
- Died: October 30, 1857 (aged 75) Floresville, Texas
- Spouse: María Josefa Becerra
- Profession: Mayor; Postmaster; Minister; Quartermaster; Political Delegate; Chief Justice

Juan José María Erasmo de Jesús Seguín y Fuentes (May 26, 1782 – October 30, 1857) was a prominent citizen and politician in San Antonio de Bexar (modern-day San Antonio, Texas, USA) in the 19th century. From 1807 until 1835, Seguín served as head postmaster of San Antonio, Texas. After Mexico achieved independence from Spain, Seguín was named the sole representative from Texas to the constitutional convention. He helped to draft the Constitution of 1824 and was a major influence in the addition of a general colonization provision. Seguín assisted Stephen F. Austin in choosing land for the first colony of American settlers to immigrate to Texas. He later supported the Texas Revolution, providing political as well as material support. He was the father of Tejano revolutionary Juan Seguín.

== Early life and his family ==
Juan Jose Maria Erasmo de Jesús Seguín was born on May 26, 1782, to a family of Spanish descent in San Antonio de Bexar (now San Antonio, Texas, USA). His paternal grandfather, Bartolomé Seguin, had moved to Spanish Texas from the Mexican interior soon after the founding of the town in 1718. Seguin's parents, Santiago Seguín and Maria Guadalupe Fuentes, had seven children; Erasmo was the third.

Seguin married María Josefa Becerra, daughter of a non-commissioned officer from Presidio La Bahía (Goliad, Texas), stationed at Bexar. Unusually for the times, Becerra could read and write. The couple had three children; two, including Juan Seguin, survived to adulthood. Erasmo Seguin helped to create the first public school in Bexar, which his son attended.

Although the Seguin family lived in Bexar, on the south side of Main Plaza facing Nueva (between current Main and Dwyer), they also owned a ranch of 22,000 acres (8,900 ha) located 30 miles (48 km) from Bexar in present Karnes County. The land had been purchased from the Missión San Antonio de Valero after its secularization. The ranch was named La Mora, and by 1810 Seguin employed five vaqueros to work it.

After 1824, he added a 9,000 acres (3,600 ha) ranch located on present-day River Bend Golf Club near Floresville. On this estate he made a home, on a rise overlooking the San Antonio River; it would become known as Casa Blanca. Here, Seguin raised animals and farmed cotton and corn. It would become an important source of supply for the Texan army. Seguín received additional income from his appointment as postmaster; he served in this capacity from 1807 until 1835, with two brief breaks.

== Mexican Revolution ==
During the Mexican War of Independence, Seguin likely sympathized with the rebellion. In January 1811, Juan Bautista de las Casas led a revolt in Bexar, overthrowing governor Manuel María de Salcedo and appointing himself head of a new Mexican state. His arbitrary rule caused much dissatisfaction within Texas, and Seguin helped to organize the counterrevolt that deposed de las Casas. A governing council was created to help lead the province until Spanish troops could regain control; Seguin held one of the seats.

In 1813, Governor Salcedo was again overthrown, this time by the Republican Army of the North. They declared Texas an independent republic headed by José Bernardo Gutiérrez de Lara. During the invasion by the Gutiérrez-Magee Expedition, Seguin was in the United States on business. He returned carrying a letter from American authorities recommending that Gutierrez be replaced. While he was en route, the Spanish army, under José Joaquín de Arredondo, had defeated the invaders, killing 1300 Texians at the Battle of Medina, and resumed control of the province. Seguin's letter was found and confiscated, but he argued that he had been coerced into carrying it against his will. Arredondo did not believe Seguin's protests and labeled him a traitor. Seguin was dismissed from his position as postmaster and his property was confiscated. He was not, however, jailed.

Several years later, Arredondo offered a blanket pardon to most Tejanos. Seguin refused the pardon and instead took his case to the courts. In 1818, the court cleared Seguin of all charges and he was able to regain his property and his postal position. In the summer of 1820, Seguin was elected alcade, or mayor of Bexar. It would be just one of many of the municipal offices he would serve over the next two decades. In 1822, he was fully restored as postmaster and in 1825 he was appointed quartermaster of Presidio San Antonio de Bexar, a position he held for a decade.

== Texas colonization ==
In the early 1820s, the Spanish government reversed a long-standing policy against immigration. For the first time, people would be allowed to settle in Texas from other countries, including the neighboring United States. In 1821, the governor of Spanish Texas, Antonio María Martínez, asked Seguin to act as ambassador to Moses Austin and inform him that he had been awarded the first colonization contract. Several months later, Seguin and Juan Martín de Veramendi met Austin's son, Stephen at Natchitoches and escorted him into Texas. The small group explored a large area in eastern Texas. Three weeks into their trip, several of Seguin's employees found them to deliver the news that Mexico had been granted its independence from Spain.

In its initial years of existence, Mexico was in much political turmoil. In late 1823, authorities called for a constitutional convention. Seguin was elected as the only delegate to represent Texas. For the next eight months, he and the other representatives worked to draft a constitution. The Constitution of 1824 was signed in October 1824. The new Mexican constitution was similar to that of the United States, with the major exception that it established Catholicism as the national religion. Against Seguin's protests, Texas was combined with Coahuila to form a new state, Coahuila y Tejas. Seguín did succeed in inserting language that allowed Texas to petition for independent statehood at a later date. He was also influential in gaining a provision for a General Colonization Law. In an extension of the Spanish policy of 1821, the colonization law would allow state governments to grant land to empresarios, who could then allot it to individual colonists. The grants would be void after six years, however, if fewer than 100 colonists settled in the land grant. Among other issues he championed was a lessening of the restriction against Catholicism and slavery.

After the convention ended, Seguin returned to Bexar. Seguín is listed as a slave owner in the 1820 US census, owning a "mulatto slave" named María Juliana Cureste.

== Texas Revolution ==
Texas colonists held several meetings and conventions to discuss their grievances with Mexican governance. Most of these were considered illegal by contemporary Mexican law and lacked in attendance by native Texans. Austin tried to persuade Seguín to support the resolutions sought by the colonists. Austin went directly to San Antonio de Béxar to meet with Seguin after the Convention of 1833 adjourned on April 14. Seguin called a series of meetings, held from May 3 to 5, for prominent locals to discuss the convention proceedings. He was the only Béxar politician to fully support separate statehood.

The Texas Revolution erupted in October 1835, and General Martin Perfecto de Cos arrived in Bexar to take command of all of the Mexican troops in Texas. Unlike most other residents of Bexar, Seguin remained at his home instead of fleeing to the countryside. His loyalty was questioned by Mexican authorities because his son Juan was also a prominent supporter of the rebellion. Before the end of the year, Cos forced him to leave the city. At the same time, Seguin was stripped of his position as postmaster; he would not regain the post.

During the revolution, Seguin supplied the Texian army with beef, cattle, horses, and corn, as well as rockets for the storming of Bexar. Seguin would follow eastward with the Texians, during the Runaway Scrape. Bringing a large herd of sheep with him, he would end up eventually losing them. Seguin's ranch would also end up being raided and depleted by both the Texian and Mexican armies, who were scavenging for food. The Republic of Texas did later award him compensation for his efforts to assist the army.

== Later life ==
After the revolution, Erasmo tried to rebuild his wealth. Erasmo Seguín was named a Chief Justice of Bexar County from December 18, 1837, until January 9, 1840. Things were going well, but in 1842, the tide again turned against him. He was accused of being disloyal to Texas. Casa Blanca was raided by Texan rustlers and his cattle herds stolen. His son would end up fleeing the country for his life, suggesting that Erasmo should join him. However, Erasmo held on. Most other Anglo-Texans would trust and support Erasmo Seguin and nothing would become of the charges against him.

In 1848, his son returned to the ranch, where Erasmo remained farming and ranching, until his death on October 30, 1857. Erasmo was buried next to his wife in the family plot on Casa Blanca, in Floresville, Texas.
