= Josefina Zoraida Vázquez =

Mexican historian (born 1932)

Josefina Zoraida Vázquez (born 21 March 1932 in Mexico City) is a noted Mexican historian, considered the Mexican expert on the Mexican–American War.

== Early life ==
Vázquez is the daughter of Modesto Vázquez. She was raised in Mexico City, where she attended public schools. Her education was conducted entirely in Spanish; she did not study either English or French in school, as her counterparts in private schools did. As a teenager, she worked part-time for her father, clerking in his bookstore and correcting gallery proofs for books he was editing. After graduating from high school, Vázquez entered the National Autonomous University of Mexico (UNAM), studying philosophy and letters. She received her degree in 1955.

Although Vázquez says she originally wanted to be a scientist, her father influenced her love of history. She was also inspired by historian Edmundo O'Gorman and his teachings on the roles of history and historians.

In 1958, Vázquez was awarded a Ph.D. in American history form the Central University of Madrid. She received a degree in history from Harvard University in 1962, and a Ph.D. in history from UNAM in 1968.

== Career ==
Vázquez is a noted historian of Mexican history, and is considered the Mexican expert on the Mexican–American War. Her work has also included scholarly histories of the history of national education in Mexico, and the first few decades of Mexican independence (1821–1845). She has also written several official history textbooks used in schools throughout the country.

Vázquez has served as a historical adviser to numerous documentaries, including one produced by KERA-TV.

A member of the Congress of Mexican Historians from Mexico, the United States, and Canada, Vázquez organized the group's convention in 1977 and served as president in 2003. She was honored by the Fondo de Cultura Economica in 2012.

== Bibliography ==
- The United States and Mexico (1982) with Lorenzo Meyer
- Interpretaciones del siglo XVIII mexicano: el impacto de las reformas borbónicas (1992)
- México al tiempo de su guerra con Estados Unidos, 1846-1848 (1997)
- Vázquez, Josefina Zoraida (1 January 1998). México al tiempo de su guerra con Estados Unidos (1846-1848) (in Spanish). El Colegio de México. doi:10.2307/J.CTV3F8NPP. ISBN 978-968-16-5693-5. JSTOR 10.2307/j.ctv3f8npp. Wikidata Q60186671.
- México y el mundo. Historia de sus relaciones exteriores dos tomos (2000)
- Tratados de México: soberanía y territorio, 1821-1910 (2000)
- El establecimiento del federalismo en México, 1821-1827 (2003)
- Juárez el republicano (2005)

== Sources ==
- Beezley, William (October 2010). "Juan O'Gorman, Daniel Cosio Villegas, and the Mexican Historical Profession: An interview with Josefina Zoraida Vazquez" (PDF). The Americas. 67 (2). Translated by Diana Montano: 253–268. doi:10.1353/tam.2010.0007. S2CID 144334742.
- Paul, Carlos (25 August 2012). "Homenaje a Josefina Zoraida Vázquez". La Jornada. p. 4. (in Spanish)
- Van Wagenen, Michael (2012). Remembering the Forgotten War: The Enduring Legacies of the U.S./Mexican War. Public history in historical perspective. University of Massachusetts Press. ISBN 978-1558499300.
