= Coker =

Coker may refer to:

== People ==
- Coker (surname), including a list of people
- Coker F. Clarkson (1811–1890), American politician and journalist from Iowa
- Coker Fifield Clarkson (1870–1930), American automotive lawyer and editor

== Places ==
=== United States ===
- Coker, Alabama, a town
- Coker, Texas, a ghost town
- Coker Butte, Oregon
- Hicks Creek (Texas), originally named Coker Creek
- Coker Spring, a fresh water spring in Aiken, South Carolina
- Camp Coker, a Boy Scout Camp in South Carolina

=== Antarctica ===
- Coker Ice Rise, Graham Land

== Other uses ==
- Coker Arboretum, within the North Carolina Botanical Garden on the campus of the University of North Carolina, Chapel Hill, North Carolina
- Coker College, a private college based in Hartsville, South Carolina, United States
- Coker Tire, a specialty tire manufacturer
- Coker unit, an oil refinery processing unit
- Coker v. Georgia, a United States Supreme Court case striking down the death sentence of a defendant convicted of rape
- Cokernel, written $\operatorname{coker}$, a concept in mathematics dual to the kernel

== See also ==
- Coker Creek, Tennessee, an unincorporated community
- East Coker, a village and civil parish in Somerset, England
  - East Coker (poem), one of the Four Quartets by T. S. Eliot, inspired by the village
- West Coker, a neighbouring village and civil parish in Somerset
- Cocker (disambiguation)
- Coke (disambiguation)
- Cooker
