= Moses Lapham =

American soldier (1808–1861)

- Born: Moses Lapham; October 16, 1808; Smithfield, Rhode Island, U.S.
- Died: October 20, 1861 (aged 53); Battle of Leon Creek, Texas
- Occupations: American frontiersman, Texas Revolution hero, Republic of Texas soldier, Texas Rangers

Moses Lapham (October 16, 1808 – 1838) was a soldier in the Texas Army during the Texas Revolution, noted for a daring action during the Battle of San Jacinto that helped seal the decisive Texian victory.

== Early years ==
Moses Lapham was born near the town of Smithfield, Rhode Island, on October 16, 1808, to Amos and Marcy Aldrich Lapham. He moved to Mechanicsburg, Ohio, with his father and attended college at Miami University in Oxford, Ohio, for a few years.

== Career ==
Lapham arrived in Texas in the middle of 1831, and he taught school at San Felipe, Texas. He lived in the household of Thomas H. Borden, while assisting Borden with surveying work for about a year. Lapham spent three years in Ohio. However, by December 1835, he had returned to Texas and resumed work as a surveyor.

Lapham enlisted in the Texas Army on February 23, 1836, and served as a scout. When General Sam Houston evacuated his troops from Gonzalez, Texas, Lapham was one of three sentinels who did not receive the orders. At one point, he was close enough to the advancing Mexican forces to be seen. Eventually he abandoned his post and fled to safety.

In 1836 he enlisted in the Texas army, was a member of Captain Moseley Baker's "San Felipe Company", and fought at the Battle of San Jacinto, where he was one of the men who destroyed Vince's Bridge. The others who were with him on that mission were Deaf Smith, John Coker, Dimer W. Reaves, Young Perry Alsbury, John T. Garner and Edwin R. Rainwater.

After his release from the Army in the fall of 1836, Lapham rejoined Gail and Thomas Borden to work as a surveyor. He helped to lay out the new town of Houston, Texas, in October 1836.

== Death ==
Lapham was later employed as a deputy surveyor by Samuel Maverick of San Antonio to survey land for him. The party of five, (Mr. Maverick, the sixth member had returned home was on October 20, 1838) was attacked by Comanche Indians on Leon Creek about four miles from San Antonio, Texas, and Moses Lapham, Cornelius Skinner, a Mr. Jones, and one other of the party were killed. The surviving members returned to town and spread the news. Thirteen prominent men headed by Benjamin Franklin Cage, a San Jacinto veteran, hurriedly left San Antonio and went to the place where the massacre had occurred. The Indians, estimated at a hundred or more, surrounded the Texans and killed Captain Cage, Dr. Henry G. McClung, R. M. Lee, a Mr. O'Blye, Peter Conrad, John Pickering and a Mr. Green, and badly wounded General Richard Dunlap and Major William H. Patton. The next day a search party brought in the remains of the dead. On the following day, their remains were interred in a single grave just outside the Catholic Cemetery. Judge Robinson delivered the funeral oration.

While believed to have been killed Captain B.F. Cage survived- was badly wounded, shot in the face. As the indians unexpectedly changed their assault line General Dunlap and Major Patton rode through the one man deep line at 90 degrees to it. (One survivor said the indian war party was about 100 indians while another survivor estimated 180 indians.) Breaking through and heading towards San Antonio. Captain Cage could not move with them in time, so rode around the end of the line and headed for his plantation in Wharton Texas area. It took him over a year to heal from his several wounds. Later he returned to fight many times as a Texas Ranger. Subsequently he attended his cousin's wedding, Captain Jack Hayes- to Sarah Calvert, in Seguin- his attendance mentioned in the local newspaper. Later he enlisted, as requested, in the CSA Army in 1865 for the final push to win the Civil War- that never came. Appeared in court at least once. Was the father of Philmon P. Cage and other children. Lived in the Blanco Texas area died in 1887 and is buried in the Blanco Cemetery. His name is on the beautiful monument outside the catholic cemetery. The error of his death at "Captain Cage's Comanche Fight" continues on to this day.

== See also ==
- John Coker
- Young Perry Alsbury
- John T. Garner
- Edwin R. Rainwater
- Denmore W. Reaves
- Vince's Bridge
- Battle of San Jacinto
- Deaf Smith
- Henry Wax Karnes
- Sam Houston
- Antonio López de Santa Anna
- Vicente Filisola
- José de Urrea
- Martín Perfecto de Cos
- Juan Almonte
- Timeline of the Texas Revolution
- Runaway Scrape
- Benjamin Franklin Cage

== Sources ==
- ” Daughters of the Republic of Texas, Muster Rolls of the Texas Revolution (Austin, 1986).
- ” Joseph Milton Nance, Attack and Counterattack: The Texas-Mexican Frontier, 1842 (University of Texas Press, 1964).
- ” The Writings of Sam Houston, 1813-1863 (University of Texas Press, 1938)
- https://www.findagrave.com/memorial/129246629/moses-lapham
