= The Alamo (2004 film) =

2004 epic war film by John Lee Hancock

- Theatrical release poster
- Directed by: John Lee Hancock
- Written by: John Lee Hancock; Leslie Bohem; Stephen Gaghan
- Produced by: Ron Howard; Mark Johnson
- Starring: Dennis Quaid; Billy Bob Thornton; Jason Patric; Patrick Wilson; Jordi Mollà; Emilio Echevarría
- Cinematography: Dean Semler
- Edited by: Eric L. Beason
- Music by: Carter Burwell
- Production companies: Touchstone Pictures; Imagine Entertainment
- Distributed by: Buena Vista Pictures Distribution
- Release date: April 9, 2004
- Running time: 137 minutes
- Country: United States
- Languages: English; Spanish
- Budget: $107 million
- Box office: $25.8 million

The Alamo is a 2004 American historical war film about the Battle of the Alamo during the Texas Revolution. It is directed by John Lee Hancock and stars Dennis Quaid as Sam Houston, Billy Bob Thornton as Davy Crockett, Jason Patric as Jim Bowie, Patrick Wilson as William B. Travis, Jordi Mollà as Juan Seguín, and Emilio Echevarría as Antonio López de Santa Anna. The screenplay was written by Hancock, Stephen Gaghan, and Leslie Bohem.

The film was produced by Touchstone Pictures and Imagine Entertainment, and distributed by Buena Vista Pictures Distribution on April 9, 2004. It received mixed to negative reviews from critics and was a box office flop, losing the studio over $146 million. Retrospective reviews in later years have praised the film's greater historical accuracy compared to previous film depictions of the battle, such as The Alamo (1960).

== Plot ==
At a party in 1835, while trying to persuade people to migrate to Texas, Sam Houston encounters David Crockett, recently defeated in his bid for re-election to Congress. In San Felipe, the Texas provisional government is meeting to discuss what action to take after their capture of the Alamo and the town of San Antonio de Bexar in the recent fighting. Texas has rebelled against Mexico, and its dictatorial president Santa Anna is personally leading one wing of his army to retake San Antonio, then invade the settlements and put an end to the rebellion. Various members of the Texan War Party called for the Texas army to depart Bexar, cross into Mexico, and capture the town of Matamoros. The Opposition Party seeks to rebuild the Texan army and establish a permanent government.

The provisional government votes out Sam Houston as commander of the Texas army; a disgusted Houston tells Jim Bowie to go to San Antonio, destroy the fortifications (including the Alamo), and retreat eastward. The Texas government then orders William Barret Travis to Bexar. Colonel Neil, the Alamo's commander, gives Travis command of the post as Neil must leave to take care of a family emergency before returning with reinforcements. Knowing that the Alamo's small force cannot withstand the Mexican Army, Travis sends pleas for reinforcements. Travis oversees defense preparations as small groups of Texans arrive, hoping enough reinforcements will arrive before the inevitable final assault.

Crockett, coming to Texas to revive his political career, arrives in San Antonio. He is surprised that the fighting isn't over and that Santa Anna and his army aren't expected until mid-March. After a grueling forced march, Santa Anna unexpectedly arrives on Feb. 23, forcing the Texans to hurriedly retire to the Alamo compound. Despite its vulnerability, the Texans resume fortifying it as best they can. Travis continues to send for reinforcements, but few men arrive.

Santa Anna's troops surround the fort, and the siege begins. Bowie meets with Major-general Manuel Fernández Castrillón to talk things over, but Travis stubbornly fires a cannon at the Mexican camp, abruptly ending their conversation. Bowie returns to tell Travis that Santa Anna has offered the opportunity to surrender, but the defenders decide to stay and fight. With his hopes of an easy victory foiled, Santa Anna settles in for a siege but orders that no quarter be given to the Alamo defenders. He orders the band to play El Degüello ("slit throat"), which signifies no quarter will be given to the Texan defenders. Bowie's ongoing illness renders him bedridden, and Travis assumes full command.

On Sunday, March 6, Mexican troops assault the Alamo in a pre-dawn attack. Despite heavy casualties, they breach the walls, and most of the Texans, including Travis and Bowie, are slain. Crockett, the last survivor, is taken prisoner. In a final act of defiance, he mockingly offers to safely lead Santa Anna to Sam Houston if he will surrender. Santa Anna angrily orders Crockett to be executed.

Days later, after hearing that the Alamo has fallen, Houston, now in full command of all Texan troops, orders a general retreat eastward. They are pursued by the victorious Mexican Army, led by the over-confident Santa Anna. In an attempt to catch the retreating Texans, and against the advice of his officers, Santa Anna divides his forces, taking a smaller, fast-moving force with him to chase Houston and the fleeing Texas government. A few weeks later, Houston halts his retreat near the San Jacinto River, where he decides to risk everything in a sudden attack when he learns of Santa Anna's presence. With the support of two cannons and a group of Juan Seguin's mounted Tejanos, Houston surprises Santa Anna's army during its afternoon siesta and in the ensuing rout the vengeful Texans massacre at least 700 Mexican soldiers. Santa Anna is captured, and in exchange for his life, he agrees to order all Mexican troops to withdraw from Texas and accept Texan independence. The film ends with Crockett's spirit playing his fiddle on the walls of the Alamo, at peace, watching over the mission, and San Antonio.

== Cast ==
Republic of Texas and allies

- Dennis Quaid as Gen. Sam Houston
- Billy Bob Thornton as Col. Davy Crockett
- Jason Patric as Col. Jim Bowie
- Patrick Wilson as Lt. Col. William B. Travis
- Jordi Mollà as Cpt. Juan Seguin
- Leon Rippy as Sgt. William B. Ward
- Tom Davidson as Col. Green Jameson
- Marc Blucas as 2nd Lt. James Bonham
- Robert Prentiss as Albert Grimes
- Kevin Page as Micajah Autry
- Joe Stevens as Mial Scurlock
- Stephen Bruton as Lt. Almaron Dickinson
- Laura Clifton as Susanna Dickinson
- Ricardo Chavira as Pvt. Gregorio Esparza
- Emily Deschanel as Rosanna Travis
- Brandon Smith as Lt. Col. James C. Neill
- W. Earl Brown as President David G. Burnet
- Tom Everett as Cpt. Moseley Baker
- Rance Howard as Gov. Henry Smith
- Stewart Finlay-McLennan as Pvt. James Grant
- Michael Crabtree as Deaf Smith
- Rutherford Cravens as Mr. Smith
- Afemo Omilami as Sam
- Dameon Clarke as Mr. Jones
- Nathan Price as Charlie Travis

Mexican Republic and allies

- Emilio Echevarría as Gen. Antonio López de Santa Anna
- Castulo Guerra as Gen. Manuel Fernández Castrillón
- Francisco Philbert as Gen. Martin Perfecto de Cos
- Flavio Hinojosa as Col. Juan Almonte
- Mauricio Zatarain as Col. Jose Batrés
- Roland Uribe as Col. Francisco Duque
- Julio Cesar Cedillo as Cos's aide
- Ruben G. Rojas as Pvt. Francisco Esparza

== Production ==
=== Development and writing ===
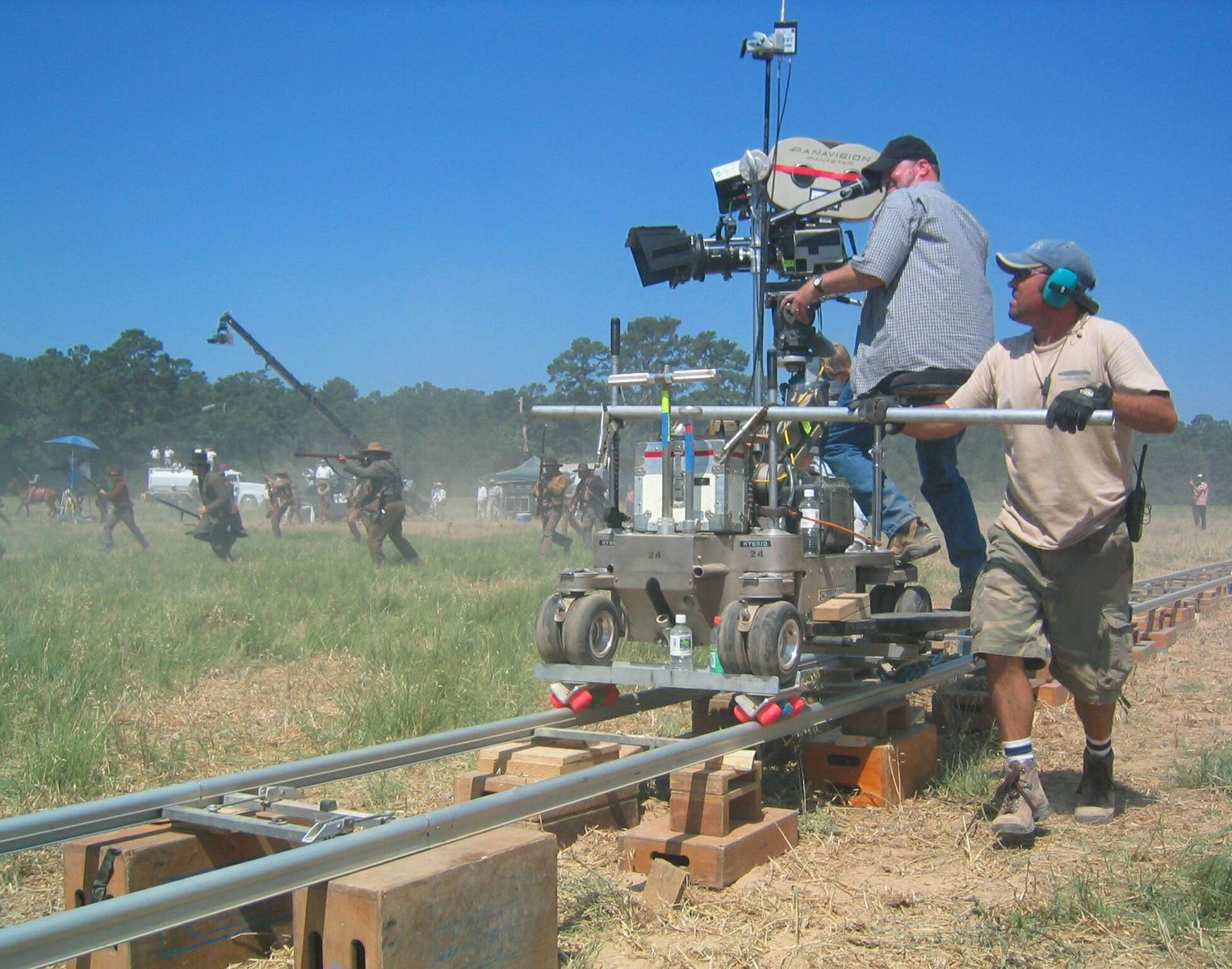
Crew members film a battle scene.

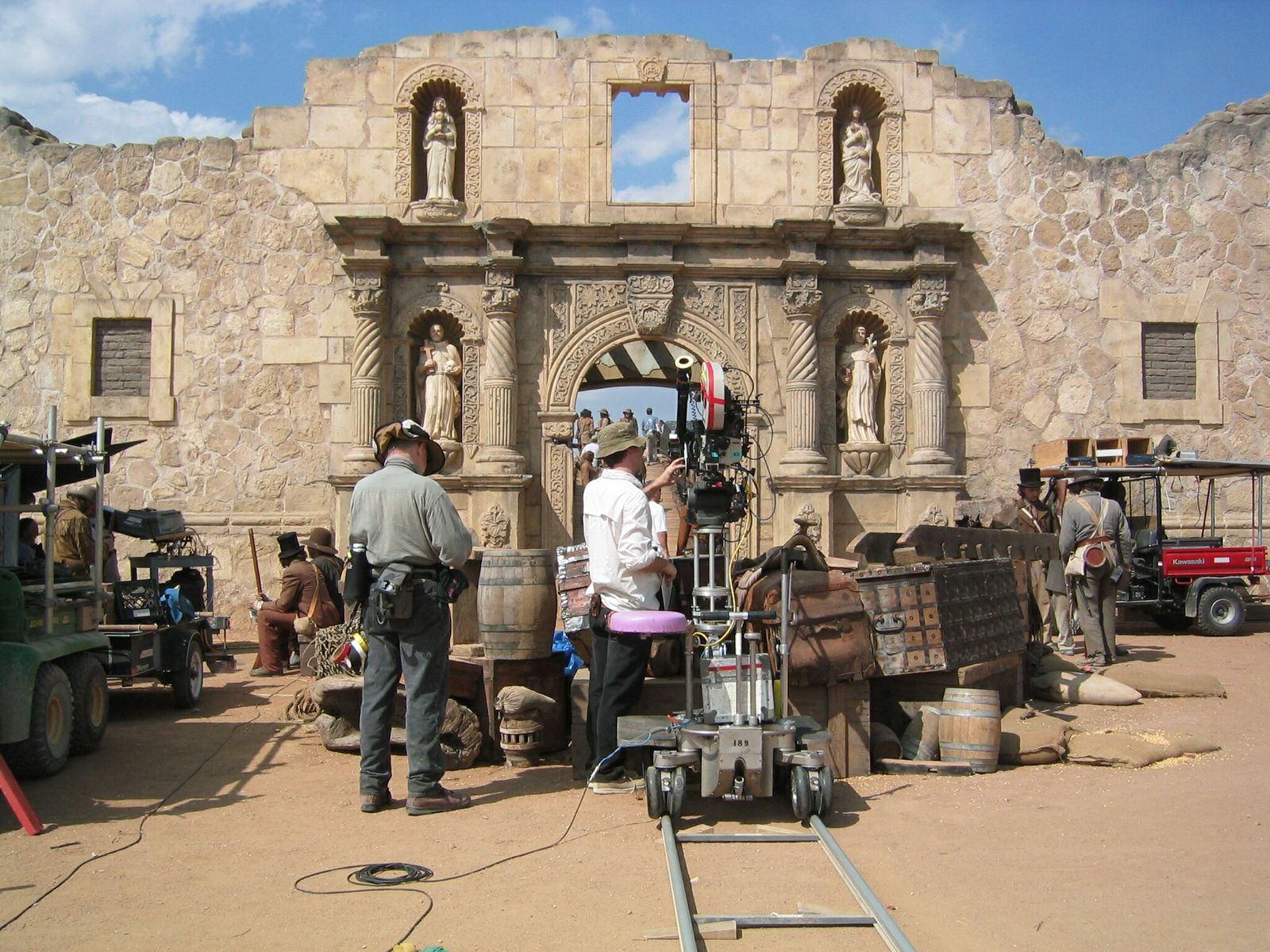
The set of the Alamo used during filming

The origin of the project began in the mid 1990's, with screenwriter Leslie Bohem, who had previously worked on films such as A Nightmare on Elm Street 5: The Dream Child, and Dante’s Peak. Bohem had a conversation with Braveheart screenwriter Randall Wallace at the Austin Film Festival, who told Bohem about a trip he had taken to San Antonio to take a look at The Alamo. Bohem then set off to write a script. In 1998, Touchstone Pictures, a subsidiary of Disney bought the screenplay, and hired Ron Howard and Brian Grazer as producers, with Howard originally set to direct.

In January 2001, Variety announced that Kevin Jarre was writing a new script, In October of the same year, it was announced that John Sayles was hired to write a new draft, Sayles, who previously had written and directed Lone Star, had come up with a 137-page draft that was considered brilliant, In contrast to the 1960 film of the same name starring John Wayne, this film was going to attempt to depict the political points of view from both the Mexican and Texan sides, as well as explore the personal lives of Alamo heroes William Travis, Jim Bowie and Davy Crockett. Additionally, Santa Anna is more prominently featured. As Howard mentioned in an interview:

"I believe audiences are ready to embrace the complexities of the film, but it still boils down to heroism.... The simplistic approach is not appropriate and it’s not interesting, We know there will be limitations and controversies".

In June 2002, it was announced that Stephen Gaghan was hired to rewrite Sayles's script. Howard stated that he wanted to shoot a grittier film, much in the style of Sam Peckinpah's work, with a budget costing about $130 million and having an R rating, further elaborating in interviews at the time with IGN and The Oklahoman, Howard said:

"I kept saying I sort of wanted to do 'Traffic', we kept working on the screenplay with that kind of multicharacter, multistory line kind of approach. … I can't say we ever had anything on paper that I could look at the studio and say, 'You've got it. You're fools if you don't do this just this way.' We didn't have that. It was still this idea, this notion in my mind more than a really fully realized script.... My sense of what I wanted to do with it was tougher, more graphic, a closer cousin to Saving Private Ryan."

There were financial and creative disagreements between Imagine Entertainment and Disney, particularly over Howard's proposed budget. Disney rejected Imagine's proposal, and due to the project not moving forward at the time, Howard stepped down as director, but he would stay on the project as an executive producer, alongside Grazer, who stated in an interview at the time:

"I wasn't interested in making 'The Alamo' as a PG-13 film, or PG movie, I didn't get it, I just didn't understand it. Whereas I did understand it through a different filter, through an R-rated, very intense (story) showing sacrifice, showing pain...all of those feelings....I didn't understand why you should do it the other way."

Robert Rodriguez was briefly considered for director, but Disney opted for director John Lee Hancock and a budget of $107 million.

=== Casting ===
During pre-production, several actors such as Mel Gibson and Brad Pitt were considered for roles in the movie. Russell Crowe was in talks to play Sam Houston, while Ethan Hawke signed on as William Barret Travis. Producer Brian Grazer wanted Sean Penn for the role of James Bowie, and Billy Bob Thornton was cast as David Crockett. After Howard stepped down as director, Crowe and Hawke exited the project while Thornton remained, Viggo Mortensen was considered as a possible replacement for Crowe, but Dennis Quaid got cast in the role of Houston. Jason Patric was cast as Bowie, and Patrick Wilson replaced Hawke as Travis. A full $35 million was spent promoting the film.

=== Filming ===
==== The Alamo set ====
Most of the film was shot between January and June 2003, primarily using sets built at a ranch near Austin; at 51 acres (21 ha), it was the largest set ever built in North America (at the time). A number of buildings, including the mission, were constructed for the film, at a cost of about $10 million. They depicted a Spanish colonial village. The sets were subsequently abandoned but were visited occasionally, at the Milton Reimers Ranch Park, although they were deteriorating; they were not intended to endure for a long period of time. In September 2011, nine of the twelve major structures were damaged in a fire. The park's web site as of 2020 makes no mention of the movie or the sets.

Hancock's version was purported to be the most accurate of all the Alamo films, but various liberties were taken, such as building the Alamo chapel facade forward 40 feet (12 m) more than the extant (and presumably historically-correct) structure. According to one of the DVD version's special features, Hancock did that to show the Alamo chapel and the interior of the fort in one shot.

==== Battle scenes ====
In the winter of 1835–1836, when the Mexican Army was moving north through desert areas, shortly before it crossed the Rio Bravo (Rio Grande), it endured a snowstorm of uncommon intensity, and soldiers suffered illness and hunger. Snow making machines were used to create the scenes of the march through the snow. Four days later, an actual snow storm blanketed the set. Two calls were made to find thin and gaunt extras to play the soldiers, but the film's scenes of the attack on the Alamo were shot in harsh weather. Extras stood for hours in cold rain, making some scenes gruelingly realistic. A few days of the filming was held up, due to bitter cold and very muddy conditions.

=== Editing ===
After the film was shot, it was edited down to three hours; later it was reduced to two hours, with scenes and certain characters removed. Shortly prior to the release, 15 minutes were added. Nonetheless, Quaid's role had been significantly reduced from the first version.

== Historical accuracy ==
The depiction of Crockett's fate came from memoirs written by José Enrique de la Peña, an officer in Santa Anna's army. Though accepted by many historians, this was the first film to show Crockett executed as a prisoner of war; all others had depicted his death as occurring during the battle. That sparked criticism from many Alamo enthusiasts and some historians, given the disputed nature of its origins.

== Release ==
=== Box office ===
The film was a box office flop. Its opening was overshadowed by The Passion of the Christ, and first weekend earnings were only $9.1 million. The film closed with $22.4 million in the domestic market, and only $25.8 million in total, on a $107 million budget. The Alamo remains one of the biggest box office bombs of all time.

=== Critical reception ===
The film received mixed to negative reviews. It holds a 29% rating on Rotten Tomatoes based on 159 reviews, with an average rating of 5/10. The critics consensus reads, "Too conventional and un-involving to be memorable". It holds a Metacritic score of 47/100 based on 38 reviews, indicating "mixed or average" reviews. Audiences polled by CinemaScore gave the film an average grade of "B" on an A+ to F scale.

Variety called it "a historically credible but overly prosaic account of the most celebrated episode in the creation of an Americanized Texas". The Houston Chronicle gave the film a grade of "B", saying Hancock, whom the paper points out is a "former Houstonian", "shows respect if not reverence for his state's mythical heritage, even while viewing it from modern perspectives"; it notes the "build-up to battle is prolonged and talky, and for a classic tale of heroic defiance, this Alamo feels more restrained than rousing. Again, it's no-win. When Hancock supplies history, the action and drama bog down. And even when he's right, he's wrong, since so many historians disagree about what happened at the site in what is now Downtown San Antonio".

Entertainment Weekly gave it a "C+", saying "Hancock's moderate, apolitical, war-is-hell dramatization of the famous 1836 battle that shaped the future of a free and independent American Texas isn't nearly the flop that the exceptionally harsh and unavoidable advance chatter has suggested it is. It's not the jingoistic call to patriotism of John Wayne's 1960 version, either. But The Alamo never harmonizes into a cinematic experience any more resonant than the average, manly, why-we-fight pic, or coalesces into a stirring cry for freedom".

According to Roger Ebert: "Conventional wisdom in Hollywood is that any movie named The Alamo must be simplistic and rousing, despite the fact that we already know all the defenders got killed (if we don't know it, we find out in the first scene). Here is a movie that captures the loneliness and dread of men waiting for two weeks for what they expect to be certain death, and it somehow succeeds in taking those pop-culture brand names like Davy Crockett and Jim Bowie and giving them human form". He awarded the film three and a half out of four stars, and it notably became the film's most positive review.

== See also ==
- Battle of the Alamo
- The Alamo (1960 film)
- The Last Command (1955 film)
- The Alamo: 13 Days to Glory (1987 TV movie)
