= Coaker =

Coaker is a surname of English origin and a given name. It may refer to:

- Herman Coaker Triplett (1911–1992), American professional baseball player
- Graham Coaker (1932–1971), British engineer and businessman
- Vernon Coaker (born 1953), British politician and government minister
- William Coaker (1871–1938), Newfoundland labour union leader and politician

== See also ==
- Cocker (disambiguation)
- Coker (surname)
