= Cocking =

Cocking may refer to:

- Cocking affair, an attempt in 1941 by Georgia governor Eugene Talmadge to exert direct control over the state's educational system
- Cocking handle, a device on a firearm that results in the hammer or striker being cocked or moved to the ready position
- Cocking, West Sussex, a village, parish, and civil parish in the Chichester district of West Sussex, England
- Cocking-cloth, a device used for catching pheasants
- Cocking (surname)
