= Two People =

Two People may refer to:

- Two People (1924 film), a German silent film by Hanns Schwarz
- Two People (1930 film), a German film by Erich Waschneck
- Two People (1952 film), a West German film by Paul May
- Two People (1973 film), a 1973 American film by Robert Wise
- Two People (band), a 1980s UK musical duo
- "Two People" (song), a 1986 song by Tina Turner
- Two People (novel), a 1911 work by Richard Voss
- "2 People" (song), a 2001 song by Jean Jacques Smoothie
