= Cocker (surname) =

Cocker is a surname. Notable people with the name include:

- Anne Cocker (1920–2014), Scottish rose breeder
- David Cocker (born 1955), New Zealand fencer
- Edward Cocker (1631–1676), English engraver
- Edwin Cocker (born 1980), New Zealand rugby union footballer
- James Cecil Cocker, Tongan politician
- Jarvis Cocker (born 1963), English musician, frontman of Pulp
- Joe Cocker (1944–2014), English rock/blues singer
- John Cocker (1815–1885), Anglo-Australian cricketer
- Jonny Cocker (born 1986), British racing driver
- Les Cocker (footballer, born 1924) (1924–1979), English football player and coach
- Les Cocker (footballer, born 1939) (1939–2017), English football player
- Linzey Cocker (born 1987), English actress
- Mac Cocker (1941–2016), Australian radio announcer
- Mark Cocker (born 1959), British author and naturalist
- Mark Cocker (wrestler) (born 1982), British freestyle wrestler
- Neil Cocker, UK-based entrepreneur
- Norman Cocker (1889–1953), English organist and composer for the organ
- Ryan Cocker (born 1992), New Zealand rugby union footballer
- Syl Cheney-Coker or Syl Cheney-Coker (born 1945), Sierra Leonean poet, novelist and journalist
- Tony Cocker (born 1959), British energy chief executive
- W. D. Cocker (1882–1970), Scottish poet
- William H. Cocker (1836–1911), English mayor

== See also ==
- Cock (surname)
- Cocking (surname)
- Coker (surname)
- Crocker (surname)
