= John Coker (soldier) =

American soldier (1789–1861)

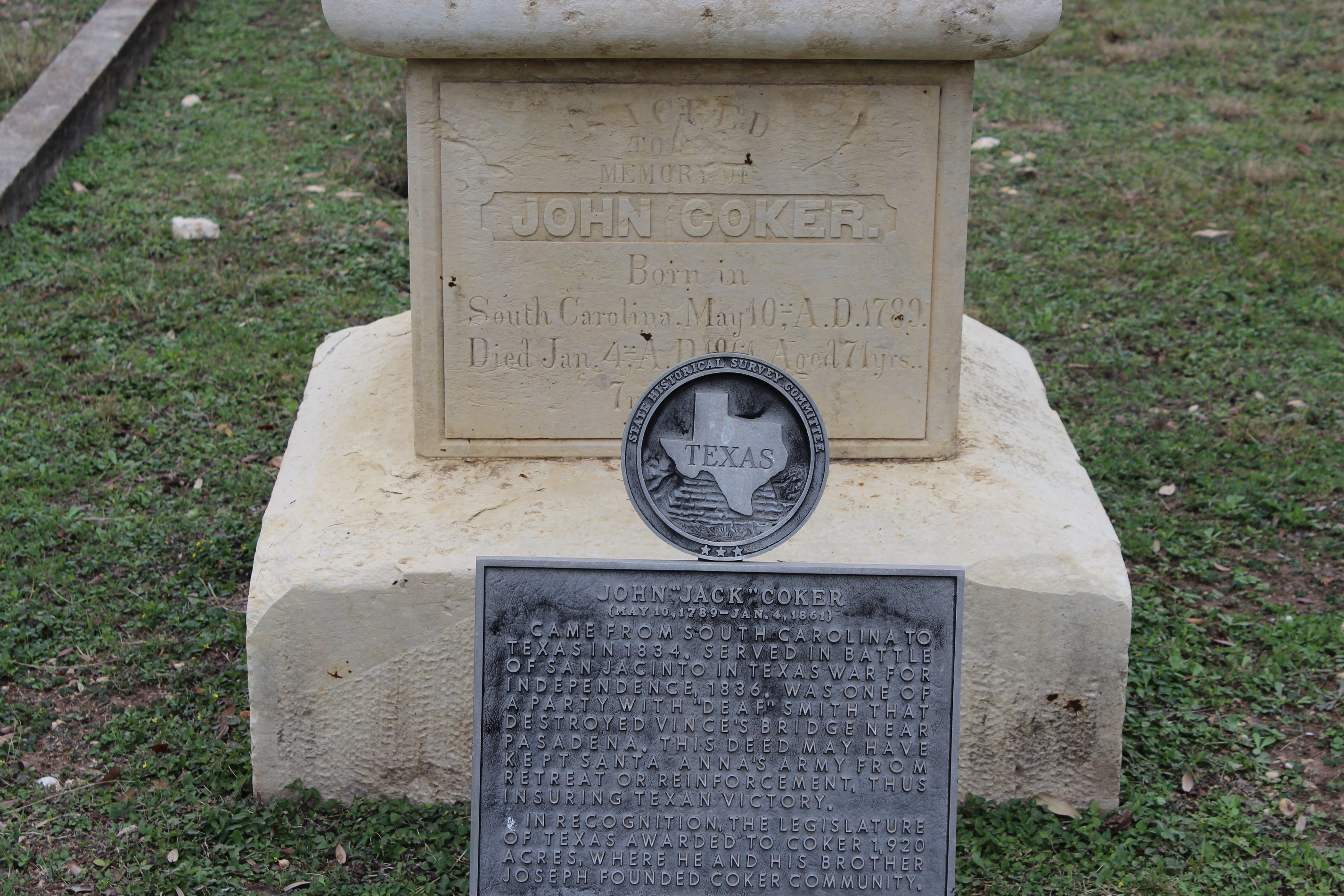
- John "Jack" Coker
- Born: John Coker; May 10, 1789; Laurens County, South Carolina, U.S.
- Died: January 4, 1861 (aged 71); Coker, Texas, U.S.
- Occupations: American frontiersman, Texas Revolution hero, Republic of Texas soldier, Texas Rangers

John Coker (1789–1861) was a soldier in the Texas Army during the Texas Revolution, noted for a daring action during the Battle of San Jacinto that helped seal the decisive Texian victory.

== Early life ==
John "Jack" Coker was born in Laurens County, South Carolina.

== Military service ==
Deaf Smith knew more about the lay of the land in and around the San Jacinto battle grounds than any man in Sam Houston's army. So when he went to Houston and told him of Coker’s idea that unless the bridge over Vince's Bayou was burned, the enemy could keep on getting reinforcements and, if defeated, Santa Anna would cross the bridge and escape to wait for those reinforcements and come back. Houston agreed with this plan, but said, "You will have to pass within 100 yards (100 m) of the Mexican cavalry and they will cut you to pieces." Smith told him that if he would permit him to take six men, he would burn the bridge or perish in the attempt(4).

Vince's Bridge was not chopped down, as mistakenly stated by some historians, but was instead burned. A larger force would have been required to cut down the massive and lengthy structure in so short a time. After the successful destruction of the bridge was announced to the Texans just before the battle, they knew that there was no chance for retreat for either army. They rushed forward, and in 18 minutes, completely routed the panic-stricken Mexicans.

Santa Anna, in his attempted hasty escape from the encircling Texans, soon came to the burned bridge, which he thought was on the headwaters of Buffalo Bayou and his private secretary believed was on the Brazos River. The general was later captured after being significantly delayed by the destroyed structure. The others who were with John "Jack" Coker on that mission were Deaf Smith, Young Perry Alsbury, Denmore W. Reaves, John T. Garner, Moses Lapham and Edwin R. Rainwater.

John "Jack" Coker was not wounded in the battle but his service record states that at the battle of San Jacinto, John Coker lost a horse valued at $175, when it was shot during the battle.

== Later life ==
In 1838 in recognition for his being in Texas before Texas declared independence on March 2nd, 1836, the Republic of Texas awarded him 1,920 acres (8 km^{2}) in north central Bexar County, where he settled in 1841 and founded Coker Community (2). The community became the site of an early school and church in Bexar county. Additionally,he was awarded 640 acres for serving in the Texian Army for six months and 640 acres for serving in the Battle of San Jacinto.

== Recognition ==
Young Perry Alsbury wrote of John "Jack" Coker, "He is a man who is second to none in honesty of purpose, valor and patriotism." The state of Texas placed a Historical Marker in his honor at his grave in 1968, recognizing his service in the Texas Revolution.

== See also ==
- Deaf Smith
- Vicente Filisola
- José de Urrea
- Martín Perfecto de Cos
- Juan Almonte
- Timeline of the Texas Revolution
- Runaway Scrape
- Coker, Texas
