= Coker (surname) =

Coker is a surname of:

- Ade Coker (born 1954), Nigerian-American footballer
- Adnan Coker (1927–2022), Turkish abstract artist
- Alexander Coker (born 1969), United Nations official and inspector
- Andrew Coker (born 2001), American football player
- Ben Coker (born 1989), English footballer
- Bryan Coker, American academic administrator
- Charles W. Coker (born 1933), president and CEO of Sonoco Products Company
- Christopher Coker (born 1964), CEO of the YMCA's in northern Colorado
- Coleman Coker (born 1951), American architect
- Daniel Coker (1780–1846), first American Methodist missionary to the British colony of Sierra Leone
- David Robert Coker (1870–1938), American agricultural reformer
- D. J. Coker (born 1997), American football player
- Dolo Coker (1927–1983), American jazz pianist and composer
- Dorcas Coker-Appiah (born 1946), Ghanaian lawyer and women's rights activist
- Ebenezer Coker London silversmith c 1720.
- Eddie Coker (born 1960), American singer and songwriter of Children's music
- Folake Coker, Nigerian fashion designer
- Folorunsho Coker, Nigerian businessman
- Francis Coker (1878–1963), American political scientist
- Frank Coker (1911–1991), American football player and recipient of the Purple Heart
- Gareth Coker (born 1984), British Composer
- G.B.A. Coker (1917–1991), Nigerian jurist
- George Thomas Coker (born 1943), US Navy aviator and prisoner of war during the Vietnam War
- Gylbert Coker, African-American art historian
- Henry Coker (1919–1979), American jazz trombonist
- Jake Coker, American football player
- Jalen Coker, American football player
- James Lide Coker (1837–1913), founder of Sonoco Products Company and Coker College
- Jimmie Coker (1936–1991), American baseball catcher
- John Coker (soldier) (1789–1851), hero of the Texas Revolution and founder of Coker, Texas
- John Coker (basketball) (born 1971), American basketball player
- Joseph W. Coker (1930–2019), American politician
- LaMarcus Coker (born 1986), American football player
- Larry Coker (born 1948), football coach, University of Miami
- Paul Coker (1929–2022), American illustrator
- Robert Coker (c.1617–1698), English politician
- Ronald L. Coker (1947–1969), American Marine in the Vietnam War and Medal of Honor recipient
- Scott Coker, American mixed martial arts promoter
- Stephanie Coker, Nigerian television presenter
- Tomm Coker, American comic book artist and film director/writer
- Trevor Coker (1949–1981), New Zealand rower
- Troy Coker (born 1965) Australian rugby union player
- William Chambers Coker (1872–1953), botanist and founder of Coker Arboretum

== See also ==
- Syl Cheney-Coker, Sierra Leone poet, novelist, and journalist
- Justin Mensah-Coker (born 1983), Canadian rugby player
- Nigel Reo-Coker (born 1984), English footballer
- Lanre Towry-Coker, Nigerian architect and politician
