= Wipe Out Kids' Cancer =

US nonprofit organization

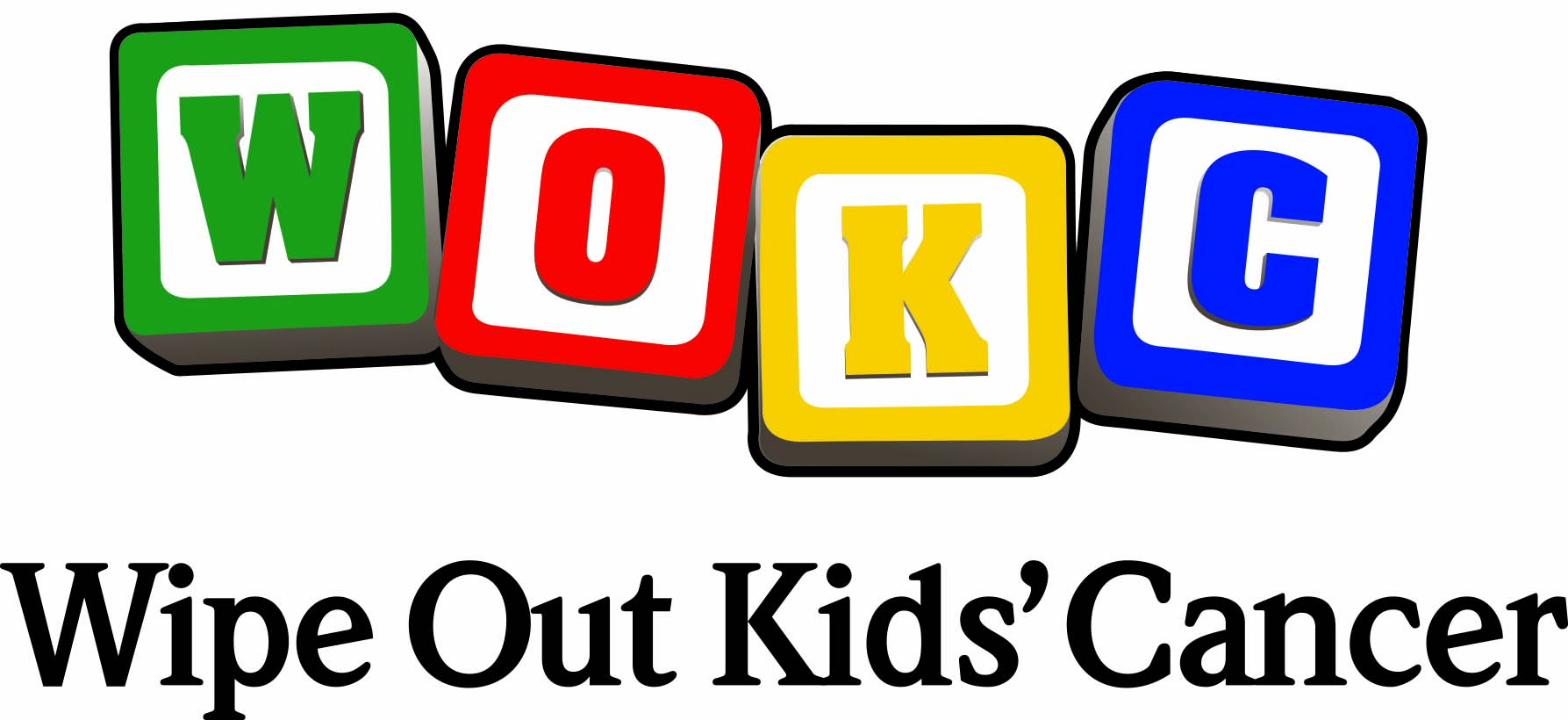
- Formation: 1980
- Founders: Cindy Brinker-Simmons
- Type: 501(c)(3) charitable organization
- Tax ID no.: 75-1892051
- Purpose: Grantmaking for medical research; public awareness and education; Family support for pediatric cancer patients.
- Headquarters: Dallas, Texas, U.S.
- CEO: Aashik Khakoo
- Staff: 5
- Website: www.wokc.org

Wipe Out Kids' Cancer (WOKC) is a non-profit, volunteer organization based in Dallas, Texas. It has raised funds and advocated for children with cancer since 1980. In 2018, Wipe Out Kids' Cancer announced former Texas A&M football player Luke Laufenberg as their 33rd annual Honorary Race Chair & Founding Member of the WOKC Youth Advisory Council.

== Mission and history ==
Commemorating 40 years of progress in investing in pediatric cancer research, Wipe Out Kids' Cancer has raised over $3 million in the crusade against pediatric cancer. Since being founded in 1980, the survival rates for some cancers, such as Leukemia, have increased from less than 50% to nearly 90%. Several of the top cancer initiatives are programs that WOKC has supported over the years.

For many childhood cancers, the odds of survival are still less than 50%. Cancer remains the number one disease killer of American children and the number two killer after auto accidents. Every day 46 children will be diagnosed with cancer. Of those, 7 will not survive, and of those who do survive nearly 66% will struggle with chronic medical issues brought on by the treatment of their cancer. Wipe Out Kids Cancer strives to represent kids with cancer and be an advocate for them.

== Events hosted ==
WOKC raises funds primarily through special events throughout the year. Its largest annual fundraising event is the American Airlines Kids Cancer Golf Classic. In 2004, WOKC made national news as one of the golfers hit a hole-in-one to win a Maserati Spyder from Park Place Maserati. Over the past five years, the event has raised over $725,000 for Wipe Out Kids' Cancer.

WOKC's mainstay event is the Tom Thumb Run for the Children Fun Run and Addison Oktoberfest 5K, which is held in conjunction with the Town of Addison's Oktoberfest celebration in September. Runners enjoy cash prizes from Amica Insurance, families enjoy a post-race party featuring Eddie Coker, and everyone receives free entry to Addison's Oktoberfest with registration.

In 2005, the Spirit of "Little Mo" Awards were introduced at a 25th Anniversary gala. The awards were created to honor community leaders who have committed to eradicating pediatric cancer. In 2008, the gala moved to spring, and appropriately changed its name to "Swing into Spring". The gala featured swing band dancing, the Spirit of "Little Mo" Awards, and an incredible auction. Ann Podeszwa chaired the 2008 event which netted over $125,000 for Wipe Out Kids' Cancer.
