= Jean Jacques Smoothie =

British DJ

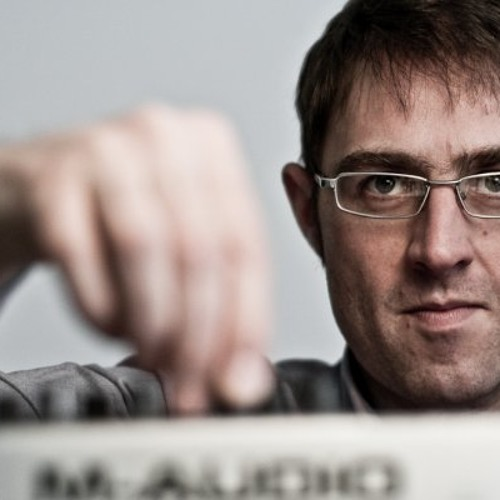
- Smoothie in 2010

Background information
- Also known as: Brinkley Paste
- Born: Steve Robson; Gloucester, England
- Origin: Cardiff, Wales
- Genres: big beat; house; French house
- Occupations: DJ; producer
- Years active: 1994–present
- Labels: Plastic Raygun
- Website: jeanjacquessmoothie.com

Jean Jacques Smoothie (born Steve Robson) is a British DJ, producer, and record label founder. Originally from Gloucester, England, Robson moved in 1994 to Cardiff, Wales, where he began DJing and founded a record label, Plastic Raygun, with some friends.

Robson released his debut single in 1997 and adopted the Smoothie stage name the following year. In 2001, he attained a surprise hit with "2 People", a house music song featuring sampled vocals by Minnie Riperton. The single reached number 12 on the UK singles chart and was the country's most-played song on radio for six weeks. Since then, Smoothie has released further singles, remixed tracks for artists including Kylie Minogue, and performed DJ sets throughout Europe. Smoothie is considered a one-hit wonder.

== Biography ==
=== Early life ===
Robson was born in Gloucester, England. In 1994, he moved to Cardiff, Wales, to pursue a degree in broadcasting. While in Cardiff, he began DJing, buying his first decks on the same day that he broke up with his girlfriend. His first performance was in 1994, in the back bar of a student nightclub titled "the Cheesey Club".

=== 1997-2000: Early recordings ===
In 1997, Robson and some friends set up their own record label, Plastic Raygun, and began releasing singles. His debut single, "The Magnificent", was released that year. Robson reported that it sold approximately 1,500 copies, although he regarded it as a "badly produced big beat" track. His next single, "Nite Time", sampled a song by The Isley Brothers and drew inspiration from Parisian house music. The single was not a commercial success, but it prompted Robson to adopt the stage name Jean Jacques Smoothie, given his music's French influences. Following the release of "Nite Time", Smoothie landed a recording session with British DJ Steve Lamacq. Recording under the pseudonym Brinkley Paste, Robson made a number of songs, including what would become "2 People".

=== 2001-2002: "2 People" and mainstream success ===
In 2001, Smoothie released the single "2 People", which prominently samples vocals from the 1975 single "Inside My Love" by American vocalist Minnie Riperton. Smoothie released the song on his own Plastic Raygun label, although he secured a further distribution deal with a larger label, The Echo Label. The single caught the attention of French producer Mirwais Ahmadzaï and English duo Moloko, both of whom recorded remixes that were featured on its CD single.

The single initially attained modest commercial success, peaking at number 30 on the UK Independent Singles chart in early September 2001. However, following the September 11 attacks in the United States, radio programmers in the UK began removing certain, potentially insensitive songs from rotation, leading them to add new ones — including "2 People" — to their playlists in their place. Fueled by this strong airplay, the song became a surprise hit. The single became the most-played on UK radio for six weeks, sold over 100,000 copies, and reached number 12 on the UK Singles chart, as well as entering several other singles charts internationally. It also became a top 5 hit on the UK Dance and Independent Singles charts, and ranked as one of the United Kingdom's 200 biggest hits of 2001.

Following the success of "2 People", Smoothie was invited to remix Kylie Minogue's 2002 single "In Your Eyes", as well as performing on Top of the Pops and receiving an award at the 2001 Welsh Music Awards. He released a follow-up single, "Love & Evil", in 2002, and it attained modest success, entering the UK Singles chart and peaking within the top 30 of the UK Dance and Independent Singles charts. However, due to the success of "2 People", Smoothie is now considered a one-hit wonder.

=== 2003-present: Further releases ===
In 2003, Smoothie released another single, "Keep It Movin'". For the tenth anniversary of "2 People", in 2011, Smoothie released an EP of new versions of the track, featuring new vocals from American singer Tara Busch in place of the original vocals by Riperton. He also continues to remix songs and perform as a live DJ.

== Discography ==
=== Singles ===
List of singles, with selected chart positions, showing year released and album name
Title	Year	Peak chart positions								Album
Title	Year	UK	UK Dance	UK Ind.	AUS	BEL (FL)	BEL (WA) Tip	EU	SCO	Album
"The Magnificent"	1998	—	—	—	—	—	—	—	—	Non-album singles
"Nite Time"	1998	—	—	—	—	—	—	—	—	Non-album singles
"2 People"	2001	13	5	3	63	18	9	51	14	Non-album singles
"Love & Evil"	2002	83	21	18	—	—	—	—	85	Non-album singles
"Keep It Movin'"	2003	—	—	—	—	—	—	—	—	Non-album singles
"—" denotes a recording that did not chart or was not released in that territory.

=== Remixes ===
- 2001, "Mirwais Extended Mix" (of "2 People")
- 2001, "Moloko's Maxique Mix" (of "2 People")
- 2001, "Louis La Roche Mix" (of "2 People")
- 2002, "Acoustic Mix" (of "Love & Evil")
