= Moseley Baker =

American journalist (1802–1848)

Member of the Congress of the Republic of Texas
- In office November 1838 – January 1839
- In office October 1836 – June 1837

Member of the Alabama House of Representatives
- In office 1829 – c. early-1830s

Personal details
- Born: September 20, 1802 Norfolk, Virginia, U.S.
- Died: November 8, 1848 (aged 46) Houston, Texas, U.S.

Military service
- Branch/service: Texian Army
- Battles/wars: Texas Revolution: Battle of San Jacinto; Siege of Béxar; Grass Fight

Moseley Baker (September 20, 1802 – November 8, 1848) was an American lawyer, politician, and military officer who served as the speaker of the Alabama House of Representatives and served two terms in the Congress of the Republic of Texas, where he led impeachment proceedings against President Sam Houston. During the Texas Revolution, he led a company of men fighting in the Texian Army and was wounded at the Battle of San Jacinto. He was named a brigadier general of the Republic of Texas militia.

== Early life ==
Baker was born September 20, 1802, in Norfolk, Virginia, to Horace Baker and Rebecca Moseley. He moved to Montgomery, Alabama, as a young man. There he became a lawyer, and the founder and first editor of the Montgomery Advertiser. He was elected to the Alabama House of Representatives in 1829 and was elected speaker of the House.

Baker lived above his means and soon found himself deeply in debt. In 1832, he was arrested for defrauding the Bank of Alabama. He soon escaped and made his way to Mexican Texas. He arrived in San Felipe de Austin with only $1 in his pocket. After borrowing $10 from another resident, he opened his law practice.

Baker, his wife, and their daughter moved to Liberty in March 1835. In October, he was granted land in Lorenzo de Zavala's colony on Galveston Bay.

== Texas Revolution ==
=== 1835 ===
As relations soured between Texas colonists and the Mexican government, Baker began to advocate for independence from Mexico. In July 1835, Mexican general Martin Perfecto de Cos issued warrants for the arrest of Baker and five other men, all accused of land speculation or being part of the Anahuac Disturbances. (Note: The other men were Robert M. Williamson, William Barret Travis, Samuel May Williams, Frank W. Johnson, and Lorenzo de Zavala.) Local officials refused to enforce the warrants, and the men were never arrested. The men were well respected in their communities, and the warrants greatly angered other colonists. This, combined with news that Cos was leading a large military force to Texas, convinced many colonists to embrace the idea of revolt. In August, Baker began recruiting men willing to fight for independence.

War broke out in October 1835. Baker was a private at the first battle, in Gonzales. When that battle ended, Baker accompanied the bulk of the army to San Antonio de Béxar, where they commenced a siege of Cos's troops, garrisoned in the Alamo Mission. There were several small skirmishes during the siege. Baker fought in the Grass Fight and participated in the final assault on the city in early December. Cos's troops were defeated and marched out of Texas.

With no Mexican troops remaining in Texas, many Texans believed the war was over. Men, including Baker, left the army to return to their families. In February 1836, however, Mexican President Antonio Lopez de Santa Anna led a large contingent of Mexican troops into Texas. Santa Anna brought the bulk of his army to Béxar, where they besieged the small Texan force garrisoned at the Alamo. Texan commander William B. Travis sent dispatches around the region, begging for reinforcements.

=== 1836 ===
On February 29, 1836, Baker joined the militia newly organized at San Felipe. He was elected captain of the company, which had about 30 members. The company arrived in Gonzales on March 6 to join the other forces that were gathering to reinforce the Alamo. As no central commander was present, the men elected Baker to take charge of all of the recruits in Gonzales. He marched them to the east bank of the Guadalupe River, about 1 mile (1.6 km) below the town, and made camp.

Sam Houston arrived in Gonzales about 4 pm on March 11. He announced that the Convention of 1836 had declared Texas an independent nation and read the men the Texas Declaration of Independence. The new interim government had placed Houston in charge of the recruits gathered in Gonzales. That evening, two men arrived from Béxar with news that the Mexican army had retaken the Alamo, and the Texian defenders were dead; Houston promptly arrested the men as spies.

The following day, Houston organized the army. All of the companies gathered, including Baker's, were placed into the First Regiment of Infantry, with Edward Burleson in charge. Houston sent scouts to determine what had actually happened in Béxar. They returned on March 13 with Susanna Dickinson, who had been inside the Alamo during the battle. Dickinson warned that more than 2,000 Mexican troops were on their way to Gonzales. Local citizens panicked; Houston ordered an immediate retreat, promising that his new army would protect the citizens as they fled.

Baker and the rest of the army marched for 26 of the next 38 hours. Over the next week, the Texian army continued to head east and north, away from the Mexican soldiers. Texian volunteers flocked to Houston's force. Baker helped with the recruitment; on March 22 he wrote a letter to the Telegraph and Texas Register, calling for volunteers and asking the women of Texas to convince their husbands and sons to join.

On March 23, news reached Houston's army that General James Fannin had been defeated at the Battle of Coleto. Houston ordered another retreat, so Baker and his men headed east toward the Brazos River. After a brief rest in San Felipe, Houston ordered the army to march to Groce's Landing, 15 miles (24 km) away. Baker and Captain Wyly Martin absolutely refused to retreat further. Houston chose not to directly challenge the men, fearing he would lose control of his army if Baker or Martin were able to gather enough troops to their perspective. Instead, he gave each of them orders to remain behind and protect key crossings along the Brazos.

At this point, Baker had about 40 men with him. His company-built fortifications along the east bank of the Brazos, directly across the river from San Felipe. By March 31, they had dug an L-shaped ditch, 124 yards (113 m) long, and piled tree branches in front. Two days later, Baker's men found four survivors from Fannin's regiment wandering the prairie. The men had escaped after the Battle of Refugio and were searching for the remainder of the Texian army. One of the survivors, Samuel G. Hardaway, joined Baker's company. Baker requested reinforcements to hold the San Felipe crossing, and within days had about 120 men under his command. He informed Houston this ought to be a large enough number to hold the crossing against the Mexican army.

On March 29, scouts Deaf Smith and John York mistook a cattle drive for a cavalry troop and informed Baker that the Mexican army was only a few miles from his position. Baker ordered that the town be burned, saying Houston had ordered it so. (Note: Houston flatly denied giving this order.) Moses Austin Bryan, nephew of the founder of San Felipe, refused to start the fires, so Baker personally set a torch to the first home. Baker and his men remained camped on the east bank.

Santa Anna's troops marched into San Felipe at dawn on April 7. Knowing that the Mexican army was close, on April 6 Baker had ordered his men to hide all the boats and rafts along the river. He then sent three men as pickets on the west bank. Private Bill Simpson took the third watch, and promptly fell asleep. The Mexican advance guard captured him; the other two escaped and made it to safety with the rest of Baker's troops. Simpson told Santa Anna everything he knew, that Houston was at Groce's Landing with an army numbering approximately 800 men, and that the Texian army meant to retreat all the way to the Trinity River if the Mexican army crossed the Brazos.

Throughout that day and the next, Baker's troops were under near-constant fire from Mexican snipers and artillery. Private John Bricker was hit with grapeshot from the cannon, becoming the first Texian casualty of the San Jacinto campaign. Mexican troops built several rafts, but Baker's men fired enough that Santa Anna decided it was unwise to try to cross at that point.

By April 9, the Mexican artillery maneuvered close enough to strike Baker's makeshift fortifications. Heavy rains caused the river to rise, and the Texian camp was soon surrounded by floodwaters. Their only way out was the main road. Baker called for a vote, and the men voted to retreat. Soon after they left, Mexican forces withdrew from San Felipe, and none of the scouts were able to discern where they had gone.

Baker's men and those of Wyly Martin rejoined the main body of Houston's army in the middle of the night of April 14. Houston ordered an early march on April 15. Martin told Houston that his men deserved a chance to rest and eat breakfast, and they would not be marching until after they had done so. Angry, Houston ordered Martin to eat and then escort the Texian families fleeing the area to the Trinity River. Worried he would be ordered to take care of women and children instead of fighting the Mexican army, Baker ordered his men to be ready to march - without their breakfast.

The Texian army made camp at Lynchburg, on the banks of Buffalo Bayou, on April 19. The following day, Santa Anna his portion of the Mexican army to a campsite less than 1 mile (1.6 km) away. Eager to test the strength of the Texians, Santa Anna sent his artillery, a nine- or 12-pound cannon known as the Golden Standard, to a spot about 150 yards (140 m) from where the Texians had concealed themselves in a grove of timber. Houston ordered Captain James C. Neill to take the two Texian cannon to the edge of the trees and return fire. The cannons traded shots for approximately 30 minutes. Both Neill and Mexican Captain Fernando Urriza, who commanded the Golden Standard's crew, were injured. The infantry was eager to join the fight; Baker later recounted that "it was with the utmost difficulty that I could prevent my company from rushing on the enemy".

The skirmish lasted for three and one-half hours, with a small number of cavalry and infantry on each side engaging. Mexican forces finally withdrew to their camp. Later that afternoon, Houston allowed Colonel Sidney Sherman to take the Texian cavalry and skirmish again. Part of the Mexican infantry joined the battle, and Sherman was forced to withdraw when Houston refused to send in a larger part of his force. Many Texian soldiers, including Baker, were angry that Houston had not allowed the rest of the infantry to join the fight. Baker began composing a letter on behalf of the army, complaining that Houston had no intention of engaging in battle, and would instead delay until Santa Anna's troops had been reinforced and grossly outnumbered the Texian army.

Santa Anna received approximately 400 reinforcements at 8 a.m. the following morning, bringing his army to 1,250 men. Texian troops were convinced that a Mexican attack was imminent. Santa Anna's men had spent much of the night preparing for a Texian attack, building makeshift breastworks around their exposed camp. The newly arrived troops were no better rested - they had marched continuously for 24 hours with no sleep or food. As the morning faded away with no sign that the Texians were preparing an attack, Santa Anna relaxed his guard. His troops, including those who had been standing guard, were given permission to rest.

At noon, Houston held a council of war with his senior officers. They voted to fight at some point that day. Edward Burleson, commander of the First Regiment of Texian Volunteers, called the officers under his command together. They were asked to vote on whether to attack at 4 pm that day or 4 am the following morning. Baker was one of only two officers to vote for the pre-dawn hour. The Second Regiment held a similar vote.

At 3:30 pm, the Texian army lined up. Baker's men, as Burleson's First Regiment, were in the center of the line. Baker addressed the men, giving a "rousing, inspirational" speech that referenced the sacrifices both civilians and members of the Texan military had endured. The speech ended with "Remember Goliad! Remember the Alamo!". Baker's men reportedly hoisted a red handkerchief to serve as their flag, and as a warning to the Mexican troops that they would offer no quarter.

At 4 pm, the Texian army advanced, commencing the Battle of San Jacinto. They crept forward in silence, hidden by the tall grass. Houston ordered them to charge when they were about 200 yards (180 m) from the Mexican camp. Baker was one of the first wounded; First Lieutenant John Borden stepped forward to lead his company.

== Later years ==
From October 1836 through June 1837, Baker served in the first Congress of the Republic of Texas, representing Austin County. He attempted to impeach Houston, who had been elected President of the new country; the impeachment proceedings failed. After his term expired, Baker moved to Galveston County. There he earned a second term in Congress, serving from November 1838 through January 1839.

The next Congress named Baker a brigadier general in the militia. He led a campaign against Indians along the Brazos River. Baker ran for a third term, to serve in the Sixth Congress, in 1841, but lost to Archibald Wynns by one vote. He was reappointed a brigadier general in 1842, following Mexican General Adrian Woll's invasion of Béxar. Baker raised a company of men but fell ill and was forced to hand command to Gardiner Smith.

Baker continued his feud with Houston, culminating in an 1844 open letter that named Houston "the greatest curse that Providence in its wrath could have sent upon the country." Following the death of his wife, Baker became a Methodist preacher. He promoted his version of the religion through his own newspaper, True Evangelist. Although Methodist leaders, who disagreed with some of Baker's teachings, asked him to discontinue publishing the paper, Baker refused.

Baker died of yellow fever on November 4, 1848, in Houston. His body was first laid to rest at Jefferson Davis Cemetery before being moved to the Episcopal Cemetery. In 1929, his remains were exhumed and reinterred at the Texas State Cemetery.

== Sources ==
- Cushman, Jackie Gingrich (2010), "Captain Mosley Baker's Speech at San Jacinto (1836)", The Essential American: 25 Documents and Speeches Every American Should Own, Regnery Publishing, ISBN 978-1596986435
- Cutrer, Thomas W., "BAKER, MOSELEY", Handbook of Texas Online, Texas State Historical Association
- Moore, Stephen L. (2004), Eighteen minutes: the battle of San Jacinto and the Texas independence campaign, Republic of Texas Press, ISBN 978-1-58907-009-7
