= Plastic Raygun =

Welsh record label

Plastic Raygun was a record label based in Cardiff, the capital of Wales, that specialised in breakbeat artists. The company was formed in the mid-1990s by Maf Lewis, Steven Robson and Neil Cocker organising and hosting concerts, featuring artists such as the Propellerheads and Bentley Rhythm Ace. They followed in 2000 with an official record label adding label manager Sam Evans.

Their most notable accomplishment to date has been the Jean Jacques Smoothie single "2 People", which was a top 20 hit in the UK. In 2001 "2 People" appeared on Top Of The Pops.

The signing of artists Stabilizer and Dynamo Dresden were significant to the label. Dynamo Dresden's 2006 album Remember, released on the Plastic Raygun label, saw widespread release in the US, UK, and Spain. Prior to the album releases by Dynamo Dresden and Stabilizer, Plastic Raygun had made a name for itself selling thousands of 12" singles across the world, with its artists touring on five continents.

== Recording artists ==
The following artists have recorded on the Plastic Raygun label:

- NAPT
- Stabilizer
- Phantom Beats
- Vandal (Electronica/Breakbeat producer)
- Jean Jacques Smoothie
- Dynamo Dresden
- Baobinga
- Sheethanger
- AtomicRoboKid
- Brothomstates (as Brothomstates and Bromide War)

== Awards ==
Plastic Raygun won four Welsh Music Academy Awards between 2002 and 2004 including 'Best Live Act', 'Best Label', 'Best Single' and 'Best Student Event'.

== See also ==
- List of record labels
