= Cocker =

Cocker may refer to:

== People ==
- Cocker (surname)

== Other ==
- Abbreviation of Autococker, a paintball marker.
- Cocker, one who follows the sport of cockfighting
- Cocker Spaniel, a dog
- James Cocker & Sons, a nursery business located in Aberdeen, Scotland
- River Cocker, Cumbria, a river in the English county of Cumbria
- River Cocker (Lancashire), a river in the English county of Lancashire
