= Coker Butte =

Summit in Oregon, United States

Coordinates: 42°22′41″N 122°50′48″W

Coker Butte is a summit in the U.S. state of Oregon. The elevation is 1,667 feet (508 m).

Coker Butte was named after one C. W. Coker.
