= Cocking (surname) =

Cocking is a surname, and may refer to:

- Edward Cocking (1931–2023), British plant scientist
- Jane Cocking Glover (1789–1876), British-American poet
- Janis Cocking, Australian metallurgist
- John Cocking (born 1944), English footballer
- Lewis Cocking (born 1992), British politician
- Robert Cocking (1776–1837), British watercolour artist
- Samuel Cocking (1845–1914), British merchant in Yokohama
- Walter Cocking (1891–1964), American academic administrator

== See also ==
- Cock (surname)
- Cocker (surname)
