= Ebenezer Coker =

English silversmith (?-1783)

- Died: 1783
- Occupation: Silversmith

Ebenezer Coker (?-1783) was an English silversmith. He began his career in 1738. One of his chamber candlesticks is at the Metropolitan Museum of Art. Four of his candlesticks were sold for $15,000 at a 2012 Christie's auction.

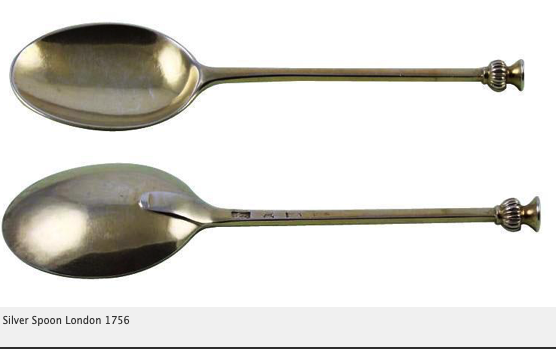
Wedding Spoons 1756 image supplied by Edinburgh Silver
