= 2 People (song) =

2001 single by Jean Jacques Smoothie

Single by Jean Jacques Smoothie
- Released: 1 October 2001
- Studio: Warwick Hall of Sound, Cardiff
- Genre: House
- Length: 3:32
- Label: Plastic Raygun; Echo
- Songwriter: Steve Robson
- Producers: Robson; Rohan

Jean Jacques Smoothie singles chronology
"Nite Time" (1998)	"2 People" (2001)	"Love & Evil" (2002)

"2 People" (sometimes written as "2People") is a song by British DJ Jean Jacques Smoothie, released in October 2001 by Plastic Raygun and Echo. A house song, it extensively samples vocals from Minnie Riperton's 1975 hit "Inside My Love". It was remixed by artists including Mirwais and Moloko.

The single became a surprise hit in the United Kingdom, spending six weeks as the most-played song on the country's radio and selling over 100,000 copies. It reached number 12 on the UK Singles chart, as well as charting in Scotland, Belgium, and Europe at large. Its success was partly attributed to the aftermath of the September 11 attacks, which prompted the removal of certain songs from radio playlists and led programmers to place "2 People" in rotation. The single, which is now considered a one-hit wonder, has been remixed by Smoothie and others, as well as being sampled and used in commercials.

== Background ==
Steve Robson grew up in Gloucester before moving to Cardiff in the 1990s to study broadcasting. He began DJing there in 1994, then began producing his own music and set up a record label. With some friends, he set up the indie label Plastic Raygun in 1997. That year, he released his debut single, "The Magnificent", which he reported sold 1,500 copies. His next single drew inspiration from Parisian house music, leading him to adopt the French-sounding stage name Jean Jacques Smoothie.

Smoothie's early singles were commercially unsuccessful, but under the stage name Brinkley Paste, he eventually landed a recording session with British DJ Steve Lamacq. One of the songs he recorded during this session was "2 People", which he eventually released under his Smoothie moniker. The song has been described as a "laid back house tune" that draws influence from the mid-career work of British electronic duo Underworld. It samples vocals from "Inside My Love", a 1975 single by American singer Minnie Riperton. The single was released on Plastic Raygun, although Smoothie further licensed the track to Echo, a bigger British record label. The song received further support from remixes by Mirwais and Moloko.

== Reception ==
=== Critical ===
Professional ratings
Review scores
Source	Rating
AllMusic	2/5 stars

Writing for AllMusic, critic Dean Carlson gave the single two stars out of a possible five. Carlson called the song "rewarding" but opined that even with the remixes included, it was "no better than most Thomas Bangalter throwaways". In late 2001, Smoothie received an award for the song at the first-ever Welsh Music Awards. BBC writer James McLaren retrospectively deemed the song "an atmospheric house monster" and noted the "smooth, seductive vocals" of the Riperton sample.

=== Commercial ===
"2 People" was a surprise hit in the United Kingdom, selling over 100,000 copies and becoming an airplay success. The single became the most-played track on UK radio for six consecutive weeks and made Smoothie the most-played artist on UK radio during that time frame. On the UK Singles Chart dated October 13, 2001, the song debuted and peaked at number 12, ultimately spending four weeks in the top 40 and seven weeks on the chart altogether. It further became a top five hit on the UK Dance Singles Chart, where it peaked at number 5, and the Independent Singles Chart, where it peaked at number 3 for three weeks. On the Music & Media Eurochart Hot 100, an aggregation of singles charts from across Europe, the single debuted and peaked at number 51 in the issue dated October 20, 2001. Smoothie released a follow-up single, "Love & Evil", in September 2002, but he is today considered a one-hit wonder.

The success of "2 People" on radio has been attributed partly to cultural reaction to the September 11 attacks. Prior to the attacks, the single failed to enter the UK Singles chart and spent only one week on the UK Independent Singles chart, where it had reached number 30 in early September. Following the attacks, radio programmers deemed certain songs inappropriate to play, and "2 People" was one of the tracks that programmers at BBC Radio 1, Radio 2, and commercial stations used to replace the inappropriate songs. In a 2011 interview with BBC, Smoothie commented that "'2People' definitely caught a mood. 9/11 had just happened and people wanted to feel good. It was an antidote to the horrors that were happening all around."

== Media usage and later versions ==
Following the song's success, Smoothie performed on Top of the Pops and licensed the song for use in commercials. On October 5, 2011, for the song's tenth anniversary, Smoothie released a new version of "2 People" on Bargrooves/Defected. The "2011 Rework" replaced Riperton's vocals with those of American vocalist Tara Busch, and the accompanying digital EP included remixes by Plastic Raygun label mates. In 2016, British house music duo Blonde released a remix of the song, premiering their version on Complex UK. A sample of "2 People" was the basis of the first "proper song" recorded by English bassline collective Bad Boy Chiller Crew.

== Track listing ==
UK CD single

1. "2 People" (Mirwais Original Radio Edit) – 3:31
2. "2 People" (Original Radio Mix) – 3:04
3. "2 People" (Mirwais Extended Mix) – 5:50
4. "2 People" (Moloko's Maxique Mix) – 6:36

== Charts ==
=== Weekly charts ===
Weekly chart performance for "2 People"
Chart (2001)	Peak position
Australia (ARIA)	63
Belgium (Ultratop 50 Flanders)	18
Belgium (Ultratip Bubbling Under Wallonia)	9
Scotland Singles (OCC)	14
UK Singles (OCC)	12
UK Dance (OCC)	5
UK Indie (OCC)	3

=== Year-end charts ===
Year-end chart performance for "2 People"
Chart (2001)	Position
UK Singles (OCC)	189

== Release history ==
Release dates and formats for "2 People"
Region	Date	Format(s)	Label(s)	Ref.
United Kingdom	1 October 2001	12-inch vinyl; CD; cassette	Plastic Raygun; Echo	
Australia	5 November 2001	CD	Festival Mushroom; Plastic Raygun; Echo	
Japan	20 February 2002	CD	Plastic Raygun; Echo	

== See also ==
- List of entertainment affected by the September 11 attacks
- Clear Channel memorandum, a memo to American radio stations recommending the removal of certain songs from rotation following the September 11 attacks
