= Neil Cocker =

Cardiff-based entrepreneur

- Born: Coventry
- Education: Cardiff University
- Occupations: entrepreneur, creative industries consultant
- Known for: Start-up consultancy Welsh business activism Political advocacy for tech start-ups Welsh Government consultant
- Movement: TEDx; Founders Pledge
- Board member of: UK Government Technology and Business Cluster Alliance; Cardiff Start; TEDx Cardiff; Ffilm Cymru Wales; Welsh Music Foundation
- Awards: 2015 - The Maserati 100 (The Centre for Entrepreneurs); 2014 - UK Entrepreneurship Power 100 (Fresh Business Thinking Magazine)
- Website: neilcocker.com

Neil Cocker is a Cardiff, UK-based entrepreneur and former music industry A&R. He is based in Cardiff, Wales and Sofia, Bulgaria. He founded the organisation Cardiff Start, which is aimed at promoting and growing new tech start-ups in the city, co-founded the TEDx Cardiff series, and served on the boards of Ffilm Cymru Wales and the Welsh Music Foundation.

== Early life ==
Cocker grew up in Coventry, England. He studied Philosophy and Psychology at Cardiff University, graduating in 1996.

== Music industry career ==
Cocker began his working life as a DJ and A&R. In 2000, along with co-founders Maf Lewis and Steven Robson, Cocker established the breakbeat label Plastic Raygun. In 2007, he established the Network of Creative and Cultural Industries (initially named Pollen) aimed at providing UK-wide networking and discussion in the arts sector. His music career led to the publishing of a "top-ten hit", but Cocker then decided to move into the business world. In 2008 he became a co-organiser of Ignite Cardiff, a network of public speakers.

He has served on the boards of Ffilm Cymru Wales and the Welsh Music Foundation. He co-founded TEDx Cardiff in 2010. In 2010 he was interviewed by Plastik Magazine about his work in the music business.

== Start-up work ==
Due to his prior experience of the music industry, he first pursued a printing industry business. In 2009 he established Dizzyjam, an e-commerce merchandise product for independent businesses and artists in the music sector.

His experience of difficulties in finding start-up funding and advice for RampTShirts in the Welsh capital led to his establishment of Cardiff Start, now the most prominent start-up community in Wales. The non-profit states that its goal is to promote young, creative figures in Cardiff, both for building connections between businesses and developers, as well as helping educate prospective new founders. He is regularly cited by the BBC, business publications, and local media, in discussions about the issues facing Welsh start-ups. He has particularly advocated for reforms by Cardiff Council and Welsh Government to reform data laws, in order to allow businesses and organisations to utilise open data more effectively.

In 2014 his creation, a "happiness map" of Cardiff, was reported in the Western Mail and by WalesOnline. The site surveyed and visualised residents' experiences of noise, convenience, and safety, on an interactive heat map. In that same year, he was named on the UK Entrepreneurship Power 100 by Fresh Business Thinking Magazine.

In 2015 Dizzyjam became Ramp Commerce Ltd, which was established by Cocker with his Bulgarian co-founder. He was unable to secure capital funding for the business, and as a result pursued accelerator programme support in London. The company, trading as RampTShirts, operates out of headquarters in Cardiff and also Sofia, Bulgaria, as well as having additional locations for printing and distribution across Europe and North America. Clients of the business have included Google, Virgin Media and MySpace. That year he was named in The Centre for Entrepreneurs 100 list.

He spoke in 2015 as part of the University of Oxford Confessions of an Entrepreneur talks series, a series which aims to give "insight into the mindset of current entrepreneurs" including both the "highs and lows".

In 2018 he received the Cardiff Business Awards "Outstanding Contribution to Cardiff".

He was highlighted in 2018 by the Welsh Government's Business Wales forum in their "Big Ideas Wales" series. The service connects businesspeople with those seeking to start their own business, providing advice and guidance as well as financial support. He was also interviewed as part of the Welsh Assembly's Youth Entrepreneurship Inquiry and is a consultant for the Assembly's scheme, Community Music Wales, which works with disadvantaged young people.

== Awards ==
- 2014 - Fresh Business Thinking Magazine - UK Entrepreneurship Power 100 List
- 2015 - The Centre for Entrepreneurs (sponsored by Maserati) - The 100 List
- 2018 - Cardiff Business Awards - "Outstanding Contribution to Cardiff"
