= Runaway Scrape =

Evacuations of Texian civilians during the Texas Revolution

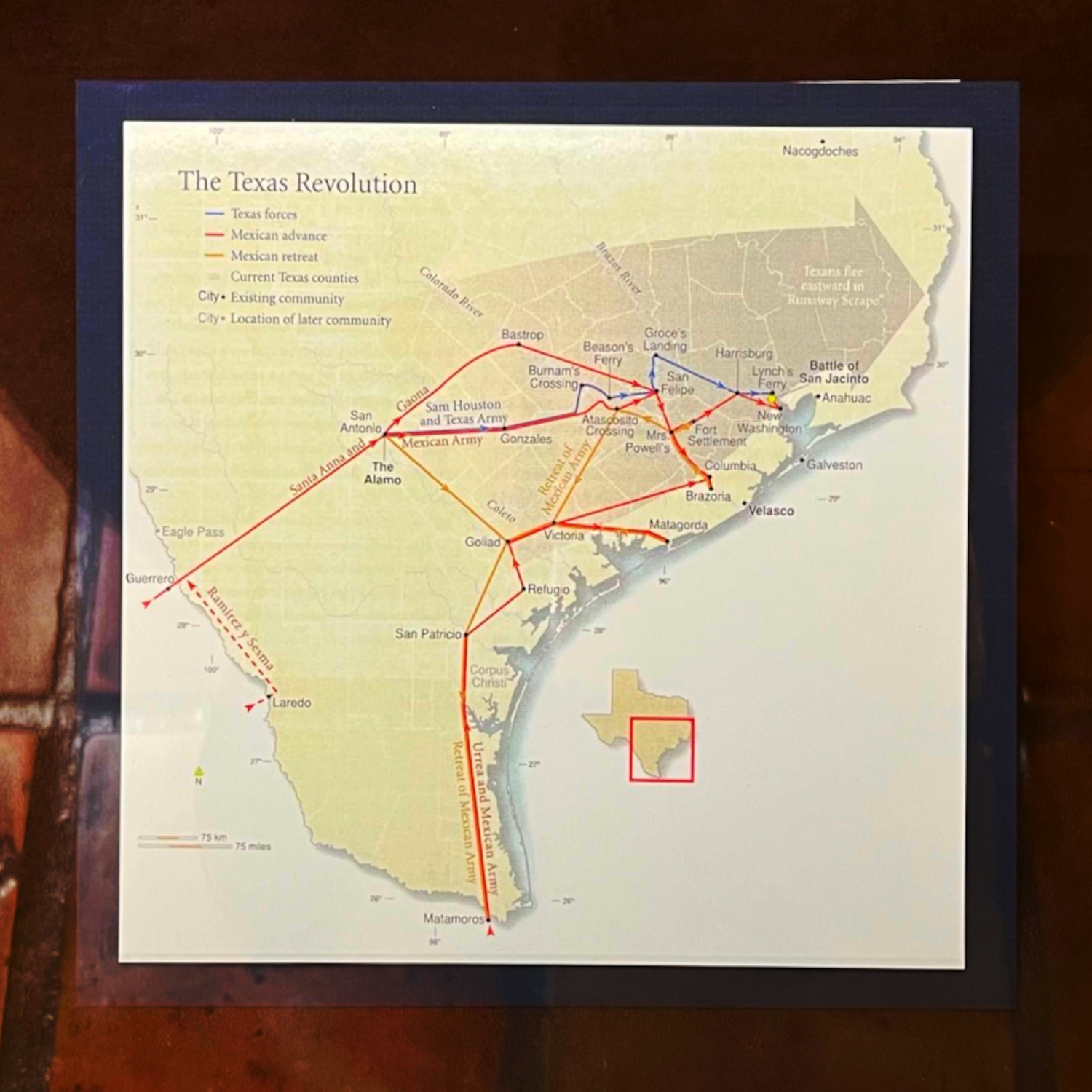
A map of Texas, 1835–36, showing the Runaway Scrape.

The Runaway Scrape was the evacuations by Texas residents fleeing the Mexican Army of Operations during the Texas Revolution, from the Battle of the Alamo through the decisive Battle of San Jacinto. The events took place mainly between September 1835 and April 1836. The ad interim government of the new Republic of Texas and much of the civilian population fled eastward ahead of the Mexican forces. The conflict arose after Antonio López de Santa Anna abrogated the 1824 Constitution of Mexico and established martial law in Coahuila y Tejas. The Texians resisted and declared their independence. It was Sam Houston's responsibility, as the appointed commander-in-chief of the Provisional Army of Texas (before such an army actually existed), to recruit and train a military force to defend the population against troops led by Santa Anna.

Residents on the Gulf Coast and at San Antonio de Béxar began evacuating in January upon learning of the Mexican army's troop movements into their area, an event that was ultimately replayed across Texas. During early skirmishes, some Texian soldiers surrendered, believing that they would become prisoners of war — but Santa Anna demanded their executions. The news of the Battle of the Alamo and the Goliad massacre instilled fear in the population and resulted in the mass exodus of the civilian population of Gonzales, where the opening battle of the Texian revolution had begun and where, only days before the fall of the Alamo, they had sent a militia to reinforce the defenders at the mission. The civilian refugees were accompanied by the newly forming provisional army, as Houston bought time to train soldiers and create a military structure that could oppose Santa Anna's greater forces. Houston's actions were viewed as cowardice by the ad interim government, as well as by some of his own troops. As he and the refugees from Gonzales escaped first to the Colorado River and then to the Brazos, evacuees from other areas trickled in and new militia groups arrived to join with Houston's force.

The towns of Gonzales, Beason’s Crossing (present day Columbus) and San Felipe de Austin were burned to keep them out of the hands of the Mexican army. Santa Anna was intent on executing members of the Republic's interim government, who fled from Washington-on-the-Brazos to Groce's Landing to Harrisburgh and New Washington. The government officials eventually escaped to Galveston Island, and Santa Anna burned the towns of Harrisburgh and New Washington when he failed to find them. Approximately 5,000 terrified residents of New Washington fled from the Mexican army. After a little over a month of training the troops, Houston reached a crossroads where he ordered some of them to escort the fleeing refugees farther east while he took the main army southeast to engage the Mexican army. The subsequent Battle of San Jacinto resulted in the surrender of Santa Anna and the signing of the Treaties of Velasco.

== Prelude ==
=== Siege of Béxar and its aftermath: October 1835 – February 1836 ===
By October 9, 1835, General Cos had taken over San Antonio de Béxar. Stephen F. Austin sent an advance scout troop of 90 men under James Bowie and James Fannin to observe the Mexican forces. While taking refuge at Mission Concepción on October 28, they repelled an attack by 275 Mexicans under Domingo Ugartechea. Austin continued to send troops to Béxar. Bowie was ordered on November 26 to attack a Mexican supply train allegedly carrying a payroll. The resulting skirmish became known as the Grass Fight, after it was discovered that the only cargo was grass to feed the horses. When Austin was selected to join Branch T. Archer and William H. Wharton on a diplomatic mission to seek international recognition and support, Edward Burleson was named as commander. On December 5, James C. Neill began distracting Cos by firing artillery directly at the Alamo, while Benjamin Milam and Frank W. Johnson led several hundred volunteers in a surprise attack. The fighting at the siege of Béxar continued until December 9 when Cos sent word he wanted to surrender. Cos and his men were sent back to Mexico but later united with Santa Anna's forces.

Approximately 300 of the Texian garrison at Béxar departed on December 30 to join Johnson and James Grant on the Matamoros Expedition, in a planned attack to seize the port for its financial resources. Proponents of this campaign were hoping Mexican Federalists (Note: In 19th century Mexico, Federalism was the empowerment of local governments, while Centralism sought to eliminate local political power and give it all to the national government.) would oust Santa Anna and restore the 1824 constitution. When Sesma crossed the Rio Grande, residents of the Gulf Coast began fleeing the area in January 1836. On February 16, Santa Anna ordered General José de Urrea to secure the Gulf Coast. About 160 miles (260 km) north of Matamoros at San Patricio, Urrea's troops ambushed Johnson and members of the expedition on February 27 at the Battle of San Patricio. In the skirmish, 16 Texians were killed, 6 escaped, and 21 were taken prisoner. Urrea's troops then turned southwest by some 26 miles (42 km) to Agua Dulce Creek and on March 2 attacked a group of the expedition led by Grant, killing all but 11, six of whom were taken prisoner. Five of the men escaped the Battle of Agua Dulce and joined Fannin who wanted to increase the defense force at Goliad.

=== The Alamo: February 1836 ===
Neill was promoted to lieutenant colonel during his participation in the siege of Béxar, and 10 days later Houston placed him in charge of the Texian garrison in the city. In January residents had begun evacuating ahead of Santa Anna's approaching forces. Neill pleaded with Houston for replenishment of troops, supplies and weaponry. The departure of Texians who joined the Matamoros Expedition had left Neill with only about 100 men. At that point Houston viewed Béxar as a military liability and did not want Santa Anna's advancing army gaining control of any remaining soldiers or artillery. He dispatched Bowie with instructions to remove the artillery, have the defenders abandon the Alamo mission and destroy it. (Note: Historians disagree as to the clarity of Houston's orders. In a letter dated January 17, 1836, Houston's wording seems to leave the final decision to provisional Governor Henry Smith. "Colonel Bowie will leave here in a few hours for Bexar, with a detachment of from thirty to fifty men. I have ordered the fortifications in the town of Bexar to be demolished, and if you think well of it, I will remove all the cannon and other munitions of war to Gonzales and Copano, blow up the Alamo, and abandon the place, as it will be impossible to keep up the Station with volunteers." The fractious provisional government had impeached Smith on January 11.) Upon his January 19 arrival and subsequent discussions with Neill, Bowie decided the mission was the right place to stop the Mexican army in its tracks. He stayed and began to help Neill prepare for the coming attack. Lieutenant Colonel William B. Travis arrived with reinforcements on February 3. When Neill was given leave to attend to family matters on February 11, Travis assumed command of the mission, and three days later he and Bowie agreed to a joint command. Santa Anna crossed the Rio Grande on February 16, and the Mexican army's assault on the Alamo began February 23. Captain Juan Seguín left the mission on February 25, carrying a letter from Travis to Fannin at Goliad requesting more reinforcements. Santa Anna extended an offer of amnesty to Tejanos inside the fortress; a non-combatant survivor, Enrique Esparza, said that most Tejanos left when Bowie advised them to take the offer. In response to Travis' February 24 letter To the People of Texas, 32 militia volunteers formed the Gonzales Ranging Company of Mounted Volunteers and arrived at the Alamo on February 29. (Note: Locally organized volunteer militias were initially separate from the Provisional Army of Texas and operated autonomously. Whether or not they were paid, or had supplies or uniforms, varied. Each had its own framework and elected leaders. They decided as a unit which battles they would fight. The Consultation only made Houston commander-in-chief of the paid provisional army he was to recruit and train. On March 4, 1836 at Washington-on-the-Brazos, the Convention also put the volunteer militias under Houston's command.)

If you execute your enemies, it saves you the trouble of having to forgive them.

— General Antonio López de Santa Anna, February 1836

== Fall of the Alamo, and the runaway flight: March – April 1836 ==
=== Houston begins forming his army ===
As the closest settlement to San Antonio de Béxar, Gonzales was the rallying point for volunteers who responded to both the Travis letter from the Alamo and Houston's recruitment pleas. Recently formed groups came from Austin and Washington counties and from the Colorado River area. Volunteers from Brazoria, Fort Bend and Matagorda counties organized after arriving in Gonzales. The Kentucky Rifle company under Newport, Kentucky, business man Sidney Sherman had been aided by funding from Cincinnati, Ohio, residents.

Alamo commandant Neill was in Gonzales purchasing supplies and recruiting reinforcements on March 6, unaware that the Alamo had fallen to Mexican forces that morning. When Seguin learned en route that Fannin would be unable to reach the Alamo in time, he immediately began mustering an all-Tejano company of scouts. His men combined with Lieutenant William Smith's and volunteered to accompany Neill's recruits. They encountered the Mexican army 18 miles (29 km) from the Alamo on March 7, and Neill's men turned back while the Seguin-Smith scouts moved forward. As the scouts neared the Alamo, they heard only silence. Andrew Barcena and Anselmo Bergara from Seguin's other detachment inside the Alamo showed up in Gonzales on March 11, telling of their escape and delivering news of the March 6 slaughter. Their stories were discounted; Houston, who had arrived that same day, denounced them as Mexican spies.

Smith and Seguin confirmed the fate of the Alamo upon their return. Houston dispatched orders to Fannin to abandon Goliad, blow up the Presidio La Bahía fortress, and retreat to Victoria, but Fannin delayed acting on those orders. Believing the approach of Urrea's troops brought a greater urgency to local civilians, he sent 29 men under Captain Amon B. King to help evacuate nearby Refugio.

Houston promptly began organizing the troops at Gonzales into the First Regiment under Burleson who had arrived as part of the Mina volunteers. A second regiment would later be formed when the army grew large enough. As others began to arrive, individual volunteers not already in another company were put under Captain William Hestor Patton. Houston had 374 volunteers and their commanders in Gonzales on March 12.

Santa Anna sent Susanna Dickinson with her infant daughter Angelina, Travis' slave Joe, and Mexican Colonel Juan Almonte's cook Ben to Gonzales, with dispatches written in English by Almonte to spread the news of the fall of the Alamo. Scouts Deaf Smith, Henry Karnes and Robert Eden Handy encountered the survivors 20 miles (32 km) outside of Gonzales on March 13. When Karnes returned with the news, 25 volunteers deserted. Wailing filled the air when Dickinson and the others reached the town with their first-hand accounts.

There was not a soul left among the citizens of Gonzales who had not lost a father, husband, brother or son ... That terrible massacre had, for a time, struck terror into every heart.

— John Milton Swisher, private in William W. Hill's volunteers.

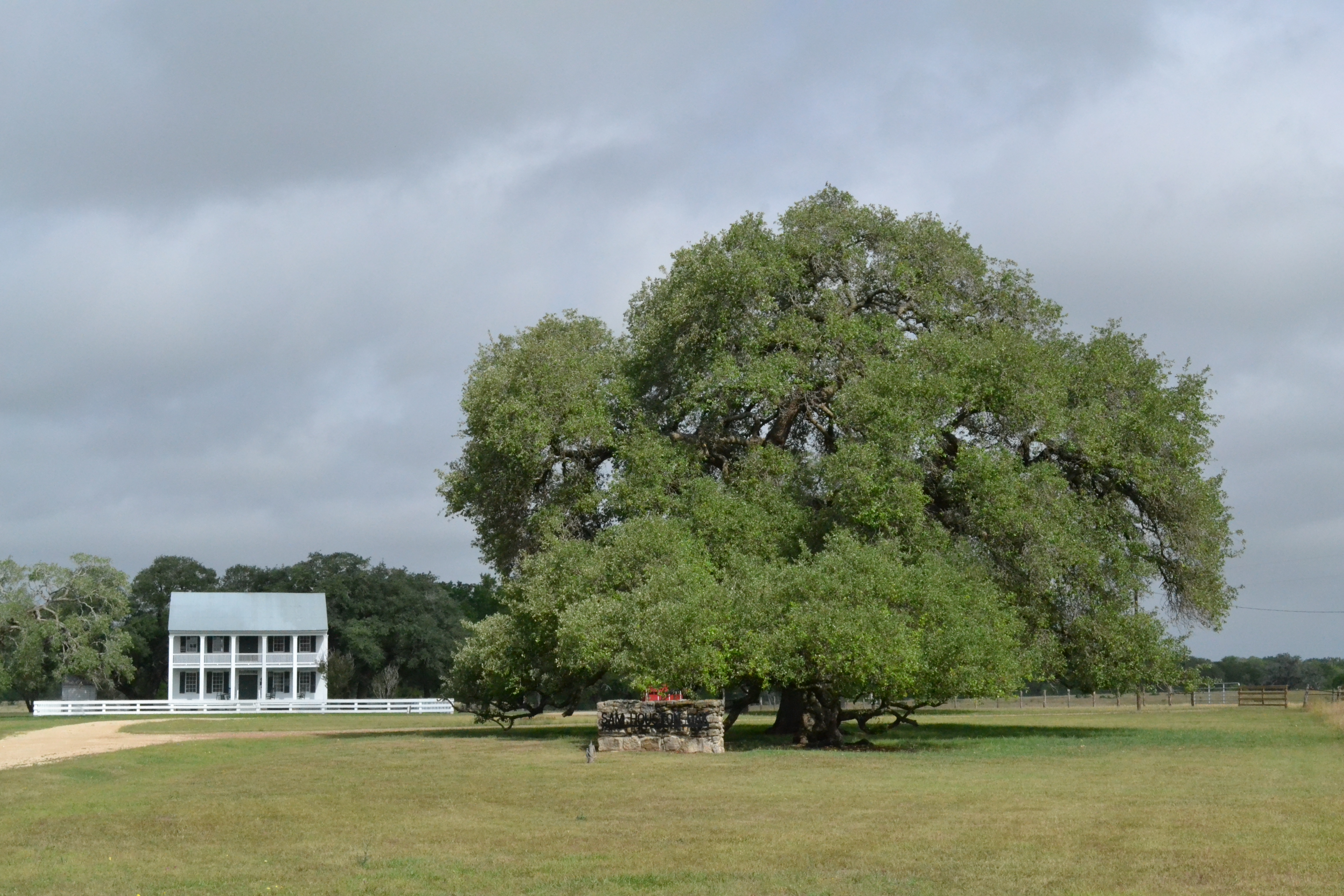
The Sam Houston Oak (Note: A historical plaque denotes the Sam Houston Oak in front of the Braches House, which itself is on the NRHP.) where the Provisional Army of Texas rested after the burning of Gonzales

Although civilian evacuations had begun in January for the Gulf Coast and San Antonio de Béxar, the Texian military was either on the offensive or standing firm until the smaller Gulf Coast skirmishes happened in February. Houston was now facing a choice of whether to retreat to a safe place to train his new army, or to meet the enemy head-on immediately. He was wary of trying to defend a fixed position – the debacle at the Alamo had shown that the new Texian government was unable to provide sufficient provisions or reinforcements.

=== Burning of Gonzales ===
Houston called for a council of war. The officers voted that the families should be ordered to leave, and the troops would cover the retreat. By midnight, less than an hour after Dickinson had arrived, the combined army and civilian population began a frantic move eastward, leaving behind everything they could not immediately grab and transport. Much of the provisions and artillery were left behind, including two 24-pounder cannon. Houston ordered Salvador Flores along with a company of Juan Seguin's men to form the rear guard to protect the fleeing families. Couriers were sent to other towns in Texas to warn that the Mexican army was advancing.

The retreat took place so quickly that many of the Texian scouts did not fully comprehend it until after the town was evacuated. Houston ordered Karnes to burn the town and everything in it so nothing would remain to benefit the Mexican troops. By dawn, the entire town was in ashes or flames.

Volunteers from San Felipe de Austin who had been organized under Captain John Bird on March 5 to reinforce the men at the Alamo had been en route to San Antonio de Béxar on March 13 when approximately 10 miles (16 km) east of Gonzales they encountered fleeing citizens and a courier from Sam Houston. Told of the Alamo's fall, Bird's men offered assistance to the fleeing citizens and joined Houston's army at Bartholomew D. McClure's plantation on the evening of March 14.

At Washington-on-the-Brazos, the delegates to the convention learned of the Alamo's fall on March 13. The Republic's new ad interim government was sworn in on March 17, with a department overseeing military spy operations, and adjourned the same day. The government then fled to Groce's Landing where they stayed for several days before moving on to Harrisburgh on March 21, where they established temporary headquarters in the home of widow Jane Birdsall Harris.

King's men at Refugio had taken refuge in Mission Nuestra Señora de la Rosario when they were subsequently attacked by Urrea's forces. Fannin sent 120 reinforcements under William Ward, but the March 14 Battle of Refugio cost 15 Texian lives. Ward's men escaped, but King's men were captured and executed on March 16.

=== Colorado River crossings ===
Upon learning of the flight, Santa Anna sent General Joaquín Ramírez y Sesma with 700 men to pursue Houston, and 600 men under General Eugenio Tolsa as reinforcements. Finding only burned remains at Gonzales, Sesma marched his army toward the Colorado River.

The Texian army camped March 15–18 on the Lavaca River property of Williamson Daniels where they were joined by combined forces under Joe Bennett and Captain Peyton R. Splane. Fleeing civilians accompanied Houston's army turning north at the Navidad River as they crossed to the east side of the Colorado River at Burnam's Crossing. The ferry and trading post, as well as the family home of Jesse Burnam, were all burned at Houston's orders on March 17 to prevent Santa Anna's army from making the same crossing. (Note: The ferry and trading post had been built by Jesse Burnam in 1824, and had survived numerous attacks from Karankawa indians. Burnam later claimed Houston destroyed his property because of personal issues between the two, not because of any threat from the Mexican army.)

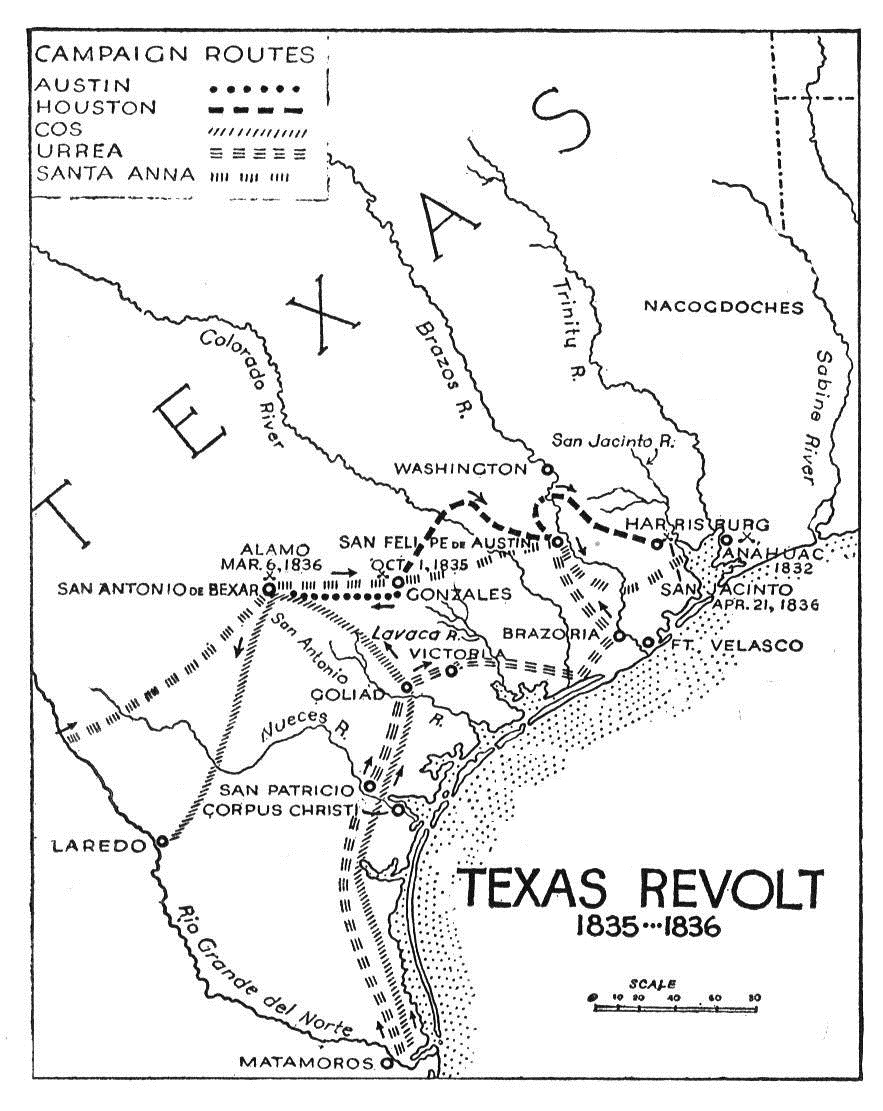
Campaigns of the Texas Revolution

Beason's Crossing was located where Columbus is today. DeWees Crossing was 7 miles (11 km) north of Beason's. From March 19 through March 26, Houston split his forces between the two crossings. Additional Texian volunteer companies began arriving at both crossings, including three companies of Texas Rangers, the Liberty County Volunteers and the Nacogdoches Volunteers.

Sesma's battalion of approximately 725 men and artillery camped on the opposite side of the Colorado, at a distance halfway between the two Texian camps. To prevent Sesma's troops from using William DeWees' log cabin, Sherman ordered it burned. Three Mexican scouts from Sesma's army were captured by Sherman's men, and although Sherman argued for an attack on Sesma's troops, Houston was not ready.

Fannin had begun evacuating Presidio La Bahía on March 19. The estimated 320 troops were low on food and water, and the breakdown of a wagon allowed Urrea's men to overtake them at Coleto Creek, ending in Fannin's surrender on March 20. Peter Kerr, who had served with Fannin and claimed to have been held prisoner, arrived at DeWees Crossing on March 25. Houston announced Fannin's surrender but would later claim to have uncovered evidence that Kerr was a spy for the Mexicans.

The Texian army was a force of 810 volunteers and staff at this point, but few had any military training and experience. Faced with past desertions, discipline flaws, and individual indecisiveness of volunteers in training, Houston knew they were not yet ready to engage the Mexican army. Compounding the situation were the civilian refugees dependent upon the army for their protection. The news of Fannin's capture, combined with his doubts about the readiness of the Texian army, led Houston to order a retreat on March 26. Some of the troops viewed the decision as cowardice with Sesma sitting just on the other side of the Colorado, and several hundred men deserted.

... the only army in Texas is now present ... There are but few of us, and if we are beaten, the fate of Texas is sealed. The salvation of the country depends upon the first battle had with the enemy. For this reason, I intend to retreat, if I am obliged to go even to the banks of the Sabine.

— Sam Houston

=== Brazos River training camp ===
==== Groce's Landing ====
Texian survivors of the Battle of Coleto Creek believed their surrender agreement with Urrea would, at worst, mean their deportation. Santa Anna, however, adhered to the 1835 Tornel Decree that stated the insurrection was an act of piracy fomented by the United States and ordered their executions. (Note: Historians Jack Jackson and John Wheat in their research of Mexican government records believe that although the wording of the December 30, 1835 Tornel Decree specified "foreigners", the document was a mere formality to green-light Santa Anna's broader plan of dealing with opposition both foreign and domestic. In a letter to General Joaquín Ramírez y Sesma on February 29, 1836, Santa Anna wrote "in this war there are no prisoners". At the Battle of the Alamo, prior to the final siege, he offered a three-day amnesty to allow Tejanos inside the mission to leave unharmed. At other skirmishes in the war, there is no indication either he or his generals made that distinction. Jackson and White stated, "When he learned that Urrea had taken several hundred prisoners near Goliad, Santa Anna expressed his amazement that they had not been treated as pirates and swiftly executed as Tornel's decree specified. He sent more letters until the tragic deed was done.") Although he personally disagreed with the need to do so, Urrea carried out his commander's orders on March 27. Of the estimated 370 Texians being held, a few managed to escape the massacre at Goliad. The remainder were shot, stabbed with bayonets and lances and clubbed with gun butts. Fannin was shot through the face and his gold watch stolen. The dead were cremated on a pyre. The retreating Texian army stopped at San Felipe de Austin on March 28–29 to stock up on food and supplies. Houston's plan to move the army north to Groce's Landing on the Brazos River was met with resistance from captains Wyly Martin and Moseley Baker, whose units balked at further retreat. Houston reassigned Martin 25 miles (40 km) south to protect the Morton Ferry crossing at Fort Bend, and Baker was ordered to guard the river crossing at San Felipe de Austin.

News of approaching Mexican troops and Houston's retreat caused panic among the population in the counties of Washington, Sabine, Shelby and San Augustine. Amid the confusion of fleeing residents of those counties, two volunteer groups under captains William Kimbro and Benjamin Bryant arrived to join Houston on March 29. Kimbro was ordered to San Felipe de Austin to reinforce Baker's troops, while Bryant's men remained with the main army.

After an erroneous scouting report of approaching Mexican troops, Baker burned San Felipe de Austin to the ground on March 30. When Baker claimed Houston had given him an order to do so, Houston denied it. Houston's account was that the residents burned their own property to keep it out of the hands of the Mexican army. San Felipe de Austin's residents fled to the east.

During a two-week period beginning March 31, the Texian army camped on the west side of the Brazos River in Austin County, near Groce's Landing (also known as Groce's Ferry). As Houston led his army north towards the landing, the unrelenting rainy weather swelled the Brazos and threatened flooding. Groce's Landing was transformed into a training camp for the troops. Major Edwin Morehouse arrived with a New York battalion of recruits who were immediately assigned to assist Wyly Martin at Fort Bend. Civilian men who were fleeing the Mexicans enlisted, and displaced civilian women in the camp helped the army's efforts by sewing shirts for the soldiers.

Samuel G. Hardaway, a survivor of Major William Ward's group who had escaped the Battle of Refugio and re-joined Fannin at the Battle of Coleto, also managed to escape the Goliad massacre. As he fled Goliad, he was eventually joined by three other survivors, Joseph Andrews, James P. Trezevant and M. K. Moses. Spies for the Texian army discovered the four men and took them to Baker's camp near San Felipe de Austin on April 2. Several other survivors of the Goliad massacre were found on April 10 by Texian spies. Survivors Daniel Murphy, Thomas Kemp, Charles Shain, David Jones, William Brenan and Nat Hazen were taken to Houston at Groce's Landing where they enlisted to fight with Houston's army.

Houston learned of the Goliad massacre on April 3. Unaware that Secretary of War Rusk was already en route to Groce's Landing with orders from President Burnet to halt the army's retreat and engage the enemy, he relayed the Goliad news by letter to Rusk.

The enemy are laughing you to scorn. You must fight them. You must retreat no further. The country expects you to fight. The salvation of the country depends on your doing so.

— David G. Burnet, ad interim president of the Republic of Texas

Empowered to remove Houston from command and take over the army himself, Rusk instead assessed Houston's plan of action as correct, after witnessing the training taking place at Groce's Landing. Rusk and Houston formed the Second Regiment on April 8 to serve under Sherman, with Burleson retaining command of the First Regiment. (Note: Attorney General David Thomas was named as acting Secretary of War when Rusk joined the army.)

==== Yellowstone steamboat ====
The steamboat Yellowstone under the command of Captain John Eautaw Ross was impressed into service for the Provisional Army of Texas on April 2 and initially ferried patients across the Brazos River when Dr. James Aeneas Phelps established a field hospital at Bernardo Plantation. Three days later, Santa Anna joined with Sesma's troops and had them build flatboats to cross the Brazos as the Mexicans sought to overtake and defeat the Texians. Wyly Martin reported on April 8 that Mexican forces had divided and were headed both east to Nacogdoches and southeast to Matagorda. Houston reinforced Baker's post at San Felipe de Austin on April 9, as Santa Anna continued moving southeast on April 10.

The Texian army was transported by the Yellowstone over to the east side of the Brazos on April 12, where they set up camp at the Bernardo Plantation. After walking 50 miles (80 km) from Harrisburgh, Mirabeau B. Lamar arrived at Bernardo to enlist as a private in Houston's army and suggested using the steamer for guerilla warfare.

Had it not been for its service, the enemy could never have been overtaken until they had reached the Sabine ... use of the boat enabled me to cross the Brazos and save Texas.

— Sam Houston on the Yellowstone's contributions

With Baker guarding the crossing at San Felipe de Austin, and Martin guarding the Morton Ferry crossing at Ford Bend, Santa Anna opted on April 12 to cross the Brazos halfway between at Thompson's Ferry, with Sesma's men and artillery crossing over the next day. The Mexican army attacked the steamer numerous times in an attempt to capture it, but Ross successfully used cotton bales to protect the steamer and its cargo and was able to keep the Yellowstone away from Mexican control. Houston released the steamboat from service on April 14, and it sailed on to Galveston.

=== Burning of Harrisburgh and the crucial crossroads ===
The ad interim government departed Harrisburgh on the steamboat Cayuga for New Washington ahead of Santa Anna's April 15 arrival, thwarting his plans to eliminate the entire government of the Republic of Texas. Three printers still at work on the Telegraph and Texas Register told the Mexican army that everyone in the government had already left, and Santa Anna responded by having the printers arrested and the printing presses tossed into Buffalo Bayou. After days of looting and seeking out information about the government, Santa Anna ordered the town burned on April 18. He later tried to place the blame for the destruction on Houston.

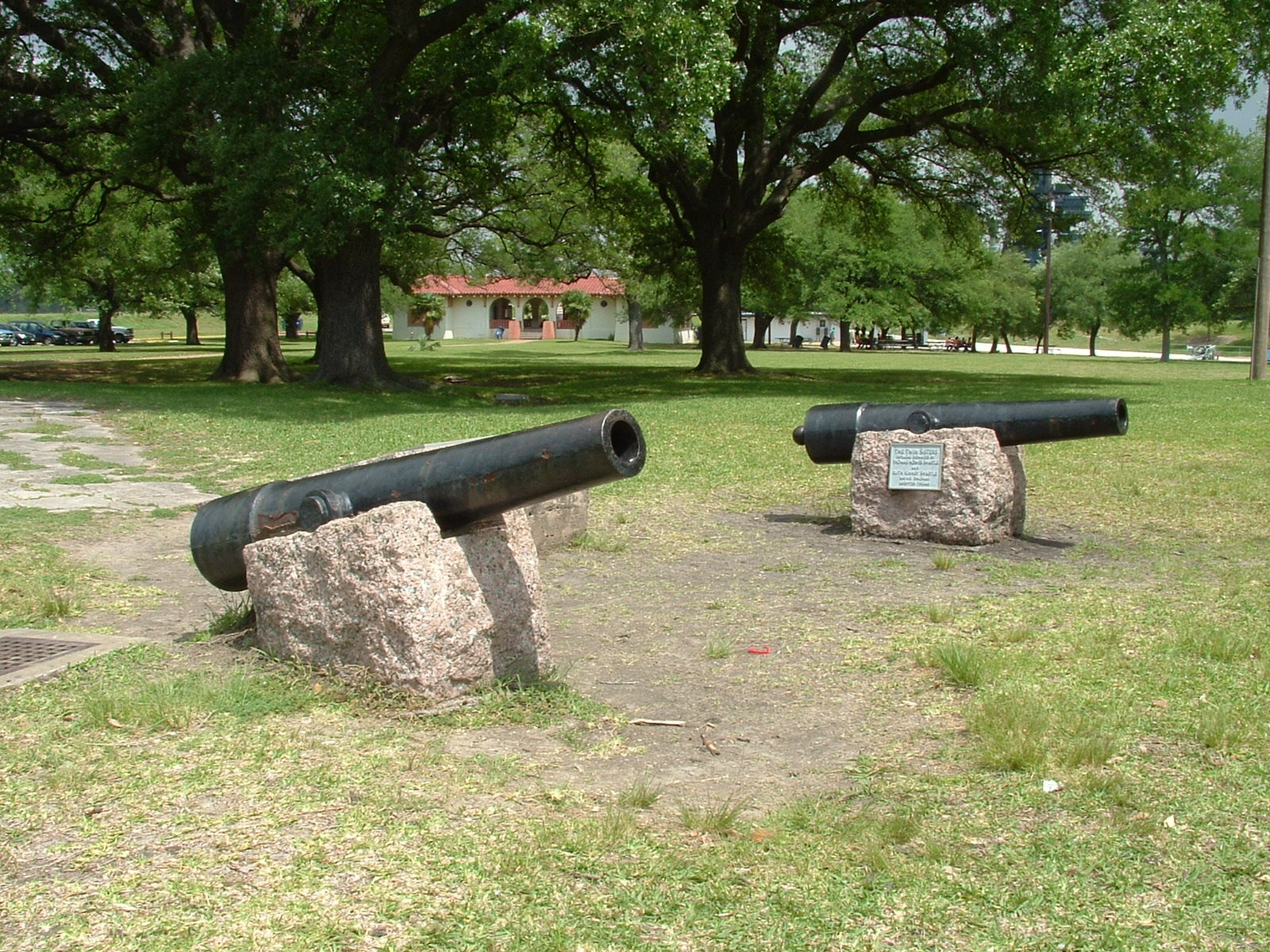
Replicas of the Twin Sisters at San Jacinto Battleground State Historic Site

Before the Texian army left Bernardo Plantation, they welcomed the arrival of two cannon cast in Cincinnati, Ohio, funded entirely by the people of that city as a donation to the Texas Revolution. The idea had arisen as a suggestion from Robert F. Lytle, one of the businessmen who helped fund Sherman's Kentucky Riflemen. Arriving in New Orleans after a lengthy trip from Ohio on the Mississippi River, the cannon were transported to the Gulf Coast aboard the Pennsylvania schooner. The cannons were nicknamed the "Twin Sisters", perhaps in honor of the twins Elizabeth and Eleanor Rice traveling aboard the Pennsylvania, who were to present the cannon upon their arrival at Galveston in April 1836. At Galveston, Leander Smith had the responsibility of transporting the cannon from Harrisburgh to Bernardo Plantation. Along the way, Smith recruited 35 men into the army. Lieutenant Colonel James Neill was put in charge of the cannon once they arrived in camp.

Martin and Baker abandoned the river crossings on April 14 and re-joined Houston's army which had marched from Bernardo to the Charles Donoho Plantation near present-day Hempstead in Waller County. As news spread of the Mexican army's movements, residents of Nacogdoches and San Augustine began to flee east towards the Sabine River. After refusals to continue with the army, Martin was ordered by Houston to accompany displaced families on their flight eastward. Hundreds of soldiers left the army to help their families. The main army parted from the refugees at this point, and acting Secretary of War David Thomas advised Houston to move southward to secure Galveston Bay. Houston, however, was getting conflicting advice from the cabinet members. President Burnet had sent Secretary of State Carson to Louisiana in hopes of getting the United States army and individual state militias involved in the Texas fight for independence. While he attempted to secure such involvement, Carson sent a dispatch to Houston on April 14 advising him to retreat all the way to the Louisiana-Texas border on the Sabine River and bide his time before engaging the Mexican army.

The Texian army camped west of present-day Tomball on April 15, at Sam McCarley's homestead. They departed the next morning and 3 miles (4.8 km) east reached a crucial crossroads. (Note: In Texas history and in historical works on Sam Houston, this is referred to as "the fork in the road" where Houston stopped retreating and instead actively pursued Santa Anna. The site is now designated as a Recorded Texas Historic Landmark and located in the present day Harris County city of Tomball.) One road led east to Nacogdoches and eventually the Sabine River and Louisiana, while the other road led southeast to Harrisburgh. The army was concerned that Houston would continue the eastward retreat. Although Houston discussed his decision with no one, he led the army down the southeast road. Rusk ordered that a small group of volunteers be split from the army to secure Robbins's Ferry on the Trinity River. Houston's troops stopped overnight on April 16 at the home of Matthew Burnet and the next morning continued marching towards Harrisburgh, 25 miles (40 km) southeast.

With the refugee families being accorded a military escort eastward and Houston marching southeast, the retreat of the Provisional Army of Texas was over. On the march which would lead to San Jacinto, moving the heavy artillery across rain-soaked terrain slowed the army's progress. The army had previously been assisted in moving the Twin Sisters with oxen borrowed from refugee Pamela Mann when she believed the army was fleeing towards Nacogdoches. When she learned the army was headed towards Harrisburgh and a confrontation with the Mexican army, she reclaimed her oxen. The Texian army had expanded to 26 companies by the time they reached Harrisburgh on April 18 and saw the destruction Santa Anna had left behind.

=== New Washington ===
On orders of Santa Anna after the burning of Harrisburgh, Almonte went in pursuit of the ad interim government at New Washington. During their flight the Republic officials switched from steamer to ferry to skiff. On the final leg of the trip, Almonte finally had them in his sights but refused to fire after he saw Mrs. Burnet and her children on the skiff. In addition to letting the government get away one more time, Almonte's spies had misread Houston's troop movements, and Santa Anna was told that the Texian army was still retreating eastward, this time through Lynchburg.

New Washington was looted and burned on April 20 by Mexican troops, and as many as 5,000 civilians fled, either by boat or across land. Those attempting to cross the San Jacinto River were bottlenecked for three days, and the vicinity around the crossing transformed into a refugee camp. Burnet ordered government assistance all across Texas for fleeing families.

== Battle of San Jacinto ==
In a troop movement that took all night on a makeshift raft, the Texian army crossed Buffalo Bayou at Lynchburg April 19 with 930 soldiers, leaving behind 255 others as guards or for reasons of illness. It was suggested that Twin Sisters be left behind as protection, but Neill was adamant that the cannons be taken into the battle. In an April 20 skirmish, Neill was severely wounded, and George Hockley took command of the heavy artillery. Estimates of the Mexican army troop strength on the day of the main battle range from 1,250 to 1,500.

The Texians attacked in the afternoon of April 21 while Santa Anna was still under the misconception that Houston was actually retreating. He had allowed his army time to relax and feed their horses, while he took a nap. When he was awakened by the attack, he immediately fled on horseback but was later captured when Sergeant James Austin Sylvester found him hiding in the grass. Houston's own account was that the battle lasted "about eighteen minutes", before apprehending prisoners and confiscating armaments. When the Twin Sisters went up against the Mexican army's Golden Standard cannon, they performed so well that Hockley's unit was able to capture the Mexican cannon. (Note: The final fate of the Twin Sisters cannons is unknown. After the Battle of San Jacinto, the cannons were sent to Austin, Texas, to be used for ceremonial purposes. When the cannons were discovered to be in New Orleans, Sam Houston petitioned for their return to Texas at the onset of the Civil War. Their last known whereabouts was in 1863 at the Battle of Galveston. Replicas are on display at the San Jacinto Battleground State Historic Site.)

== Aftermath ==
The Yellowstone saw war service for the Republic one more time on May 7, when it transported Houston and his prisoner Santa Anna, along with the government Santa Anna tried to extinguish, to Galveston Island. (Note: Houston's agreement when he impressed the Yellowstone steamboat April 2 through April 14, was for Ross and the 17-man crew to receive at least 1/3 of a league of land (more for officers) as payment. The crew was not obligated to fight. When Stephen F. Austin died in December 1836, the Yellowstone transported his body to Brazoria County for burial. Nothing is known about the steamer after 1837.) From there, the government and Santa Anna traveled to Velasco for the signing of treaties. Houston had suffered a serious wound to his foot during the battle and on May 28 boarded the schooner Flora for medical treatment in New Orleans.

Not until news of the victory at San Jacinto spread did the refugees return to their homesteads and businesses, or whatever was left after the destruction caused by both armies. Throughout Texas, possessions had been abandoned and later looted. Businesses, homes and farms were wiped out by the devastation of war. Often there was nothing left to go back to, but those who went home began to pick up their lives and move forward. San Felipe de Austin never really recovered from its total destruction. The few people who returned there moved elsewhere, sooner or later. Secretary of War Rusk later commended the women of Texas who held their families together during the flight, while their men volunteered to fight: "The men of Texas deserve much credit, but more was due the women. Armed men facing a foe could not but be brave; but the women, with their little children around them, without means of defense or power to resist, faced danger and death with unflinching courage."

== See also ==
- Timeline of the Texas Revolution
