= Coker, Texas =

Human settlement in Bexar County, Texas

Coordinates: 29.558°N 98.491°W

Coker was a community located in north central Bexar County, Texas, US, near Hill Country Village, along Loop 1604.

== History ==
The Coker Community was founded in 1841 by John Coker (1789–1851) on 1,920 acres (7.8 km^{2}) of land he had been awarded for his service in the Texas Revolution.

James Harrison Coker (1827–1892), son of Joseph Coker, John Coker's brother, was the first teacher at the Coker School, and his daughter Sarah Jane Coker (1860–1930) was the midwife there. Sarah Jane was married to Zachary Taylor Autry who was a Texas Ranger and early settler of Northern Bexar County, Texas.

A family member can be found under the name of Andie Coker, currently residing in Round Rock, Texas.

== See also ==
- John Coker
- Republic of Texas

== Sources ==
- Haunting the graveyard, Coker Cemetery Association; 1st edition (September 3, 2019) ISBN 978-1947460089
