= Eddie Coker =

American musician (born 1960)

- Born: December 1, 1960 (age 64); Midland, Texas, U.S.
- Occupation: musician
- Years active: 1987-present

Edward Eugene Coker (born December 1, 1960) is an American children’s music singer-songwriter originally based in Dallas, Texas.

Coker grew up in Highland Park, Texas, attended Highland Park High School, and earned a degree in music from Southern Methodist University. Originally an opera singer, Coker has been writing, recording, and performing children's music since 1987. Coker's songs draw on a wide range of rock and popular influences ranging from The B-52's and Queen to classical music. His songs and performances also feature fanciful and quirky characters such as Fred, a "purple red-truck-driving duck", and Regina, a musician-turned-construction-worker octopus.

Coker has composed music for Barney & Friends, Chuck E. Cheese, and Borders Books, and was the host of the Saturday-morning show "The Weird, Wild World of Eddie Coker" on Radio Disney. He typically performs over 200 concerts a year; fellow Texas musician Sara Hickman described him as "the James Brown of children's music... The hardest-working man in kids' show business." He currently resides in Manitou Springs, Colorado.

== Discography ==
- The Happy One (1992)
- Say Hello (1994)
- Welcome to the Island (1995)
- What's Cooking? (1996)
- Schnorgel & Berg (1998)
- E.C. on CD (compilation) (1998)
- Wow! (compilation) (1998)
- Hmmm.... (compilation) (1998)
- Save Our Planet (compilation) (2000)
- Seven Songs (compilation) (2002)
- Wezmore (2014)

== Videos ==
- Sock Lobster
- Take A Walk on the Child Side
- The Bright Side of the Moon
- Kids for Character-Himself
- Choices Count-Himself
- Eddie Coker Rocks Your World
