= Grass Fight =

1835 Texas Revolution battle

- Part of the Texas Revolution
| Date | November 26, 1835 |
| Location | near San Antonio de Béxar 29.41°N 98.51°W |
| Result | Texian victory |

Belligerents
| Texian Army | Centralist Republic of Mexico |

Commanders and leaders
| James Bowie; William Jack | |

Strength
| ≈140 cavalry and infantry | 100–150 cavalry and infantry 1 cannon |

Casualties and losses
| 4 wounded 1 deserted | 3 killed 14 wounded |

The Grass Fight was a small battle during the Texas Revolution, fought between the Mexican Army and the Texian Army. The battle took place on November 26, 1835, just south of San Antonio de Béxar in the Mexican region of Texas. The Texas Revolution had officially begun on October 2 and by the end of the month the Texians had initiated a siege of Béxar, home of the largest Mexican garrison in the province. Bored with the inactivity, many of the Texian soldiers returned home; a smaller number of adventurers from the United States arrived to replace them. After the Texian Army rejected commander-in-chief Stephen F. Austin's call to launch an assault on Béxar on November 22, Austin resigned from the army. The men elected Edward Burleson their new commander-in-chief.

On November 26, Texian scout Deaf Smith brought news of a Mexican pack train, accompanied by 50–100 soldiers, that was on its way to Bexar. The Texian camp was convinced that the pack train carried silver to pay the Mexican garrison and purchase supplies. Burleson ordered Colonel James Bowie to take 45–50 cavalry and intercept the train. An additional 100 infantry followed. On seeing the battle commence, Mexican General Martín Perfecto de Cos sent reinforcements from Bexar. The Texians repulsed several attacks by Mexican soldiers, who finally retreated to Bexar. When the Texians examined the abandoned pack train they discovered that, instead of silver, the mules carried freshly cut grass to feed the Mexican Army horses. Four Texians were injured, and historian Alwyn Barr states that three Mexican soldiers were killed, although Bowie and Burleson initially claimed the number was much higher.

== Background ==
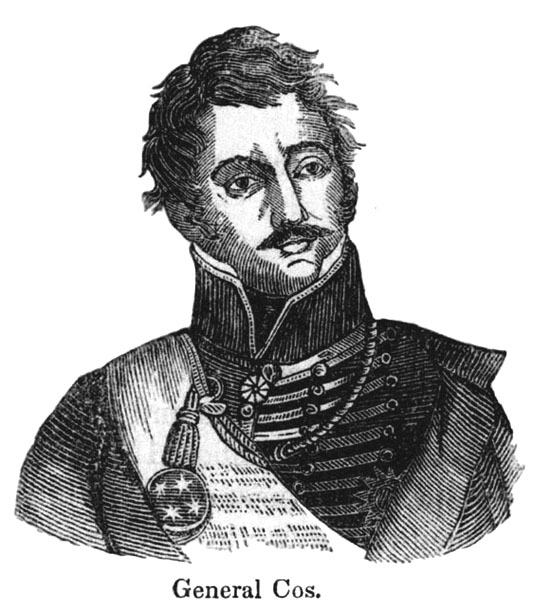
Gen. Martín Perfecto de Cos, commander of the Álamo garrison

On October 2, 1835, Texas colonists attacked a Mexican force at the Battle of Gonzales, formally launching the Texas Revolution. After the battle ended, disgruntled colonists continued to assemble in Gonzales, eager to put a decisive end to Mexican control over the area. On October 11 the disorganized volunteers elected Stephen F. Austin, who had settled the first English-speaking colonists in Texas, as their commander-in-chief. Several days later Austin marched his newly created Texian Army towards San Antonio de Béxar, where General Martín Perfecto de Cos, brother-in-law of Mexican president Antonio López de Santa Anna, oversaw the garrison at the Alamo. In late October the Texians initiated a siege of Béxar.

== Battle ==
At 10:00 a.m. on November 26, Texian scout Erastus "Deaf" Smith rode into camp to report that a pack train of mules and horses and donkeys, accompanied by 50–100 Mexican soldiers, was within 5 miles (8.0 km) of Béxar. For several days, the Texians had heard rumors that the Mexican Army was expecting a shipment of silver and gold to pay the troops and purchase additional supplies. The Texians had been fighting without pay, and most wanted to charge from camp and loot the expected riches. Burleson calmed the crowd and then ordered Colonel James Bowie to take 35–40 mounted men to investigate, but only attack if necessary. After Bowie recruited the army's 12 best marksmen for the expedition, there was little doubt that he intended to find a reason to attack. Burleson managed to stop the entire army from following by sending Colonel William Jack with 100 infantry to support Bowie's men.

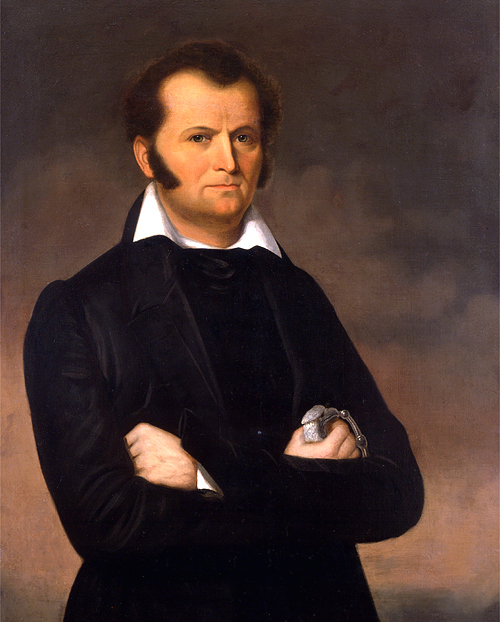
Colonel James Bowie led the Texian cavalry during the Grass Fight

About 1 mile (1.6 km) from Béxar, Bowie and his men spotted the Mexican soldiers crossing a dry ravine. This was likely near the confluence of the Alazán, Apache, and San Pedro Creeks. Bowie's men charged the Mexican party, scattering the mules. The mounted forces briefly exchanged fire, and then both sides dismounted and took cover in dry streambeds. The Mexican forces counterattacked but were repulsed. In Béxar, General Cos saw the battle begin and sent 50 infantry and 1 cannon to provide cover so the cavalry could retreat to town. The Texian infantry also heard the initial shots and rushed toward the battle, at one point wading through waist-deep water. They approached the battlefield during a lull. The lack of noise made it difficult for them to ascertain where the Mexican troops were, and the Texians were surprised to find themselves between the Mexican cavalry and infantry. As the Mexican troops began firing, the Texian infantry troops dropped to the ground. Colonel Thomas Rusk led a group of 15 in an attack on the nearest Mexican cavalry; as those cavalrymen fled the Texian infantry was able to scramble to cover.

The Texian cavalry joined their infantrymen. Burleson's father, James Burleson, led a cavalry advance on the Mexican position, yelling, "Boys, we have but once to die, they are here in the ditch. Charge them!" The Mexican artillery fired three times, driving the Texians back. Three times the Mexican cavalry attempted to take a small rise to give the artillery better position; they were repulsed. The Mexican infantry then attacked. Rusk wrote of the Mexican attack: "These men advanced with great coolness and bravery under a destructive fire from our men, preserving ... strict order and exhibiting no confusion." The infantry abandoned their charge when they realized that Texian James Swisher had led a band of cavalry to try to take the Mexican cannon. The Mexican forces then withdrew towards Béxar.

== Aftermath ==
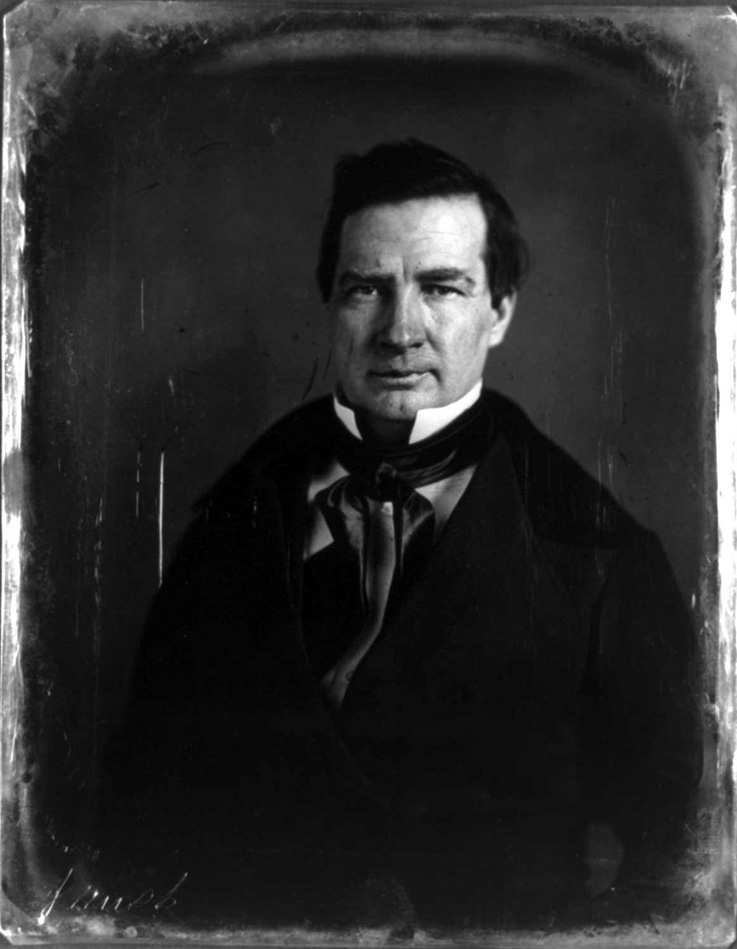
Colonel Thomas Rusk participated in the Grass Fight

Four Texians were wounded in the fighting, and one soldier deserted during the battle. In his reports, Burleson claimed that 15 Mexican soldiers had been killed and 7 wounded, while Bowie claimed that 60 Mexican soldiers had been killed. In his book Texans in Revolt: the Battle for San Antonio, 1835, historian Alwyn Barr stated that only 3 Mexican soldiers had been killed and 14 wounded; most of the casualties were from the cavalry companies. Burleson praised all of his officers for their conduct; Bowie received the most mention.

The Texians captured 40 horses and mules. To their surprise, the saddlebags did not contain bullion. Instead, the mules had been carrying freshly cut grass to feed the Mexican horses trapped in Béxar; this prize gave the battle its name. Although the engagement, which historian J. R. Edmondson termed a "ludicrous affair", did not yield valuable plunder, it did serve to unite the Texian Army. Days before, the army had been bitterly divided and unwilling to risk a prolonged siege or assault. With their success at the Grass Fight, however, the Texian soldiers began to believe that, although outnumbered, they could prevail over the Béxar garrison. The Texians believed that Cos must have been desperate to send troops outside of the safety of Béxar.

Several days later, on December 1, a handful of Americans in Béxar convinced Cos to allow them free passage from the city. Although they had promised to leave the country, the men, including Samuel Maverick, instead joined the Texian Army and provided information about the Mexican defenses and the low morale within the town. Buoyed by their Grass Fight victory, on December 5 the Texians launched an attack on Béxar; Cos surrendered on December 9. As a condition of their parole, the Mexican troops were forced to leave the province, leaving the Texas colonists in full control.

== See also ==
- List of Texas Revolution battles
- Timeline of the Texas Revolution
