= Deaf Smith =

American soldier (1787–1837)

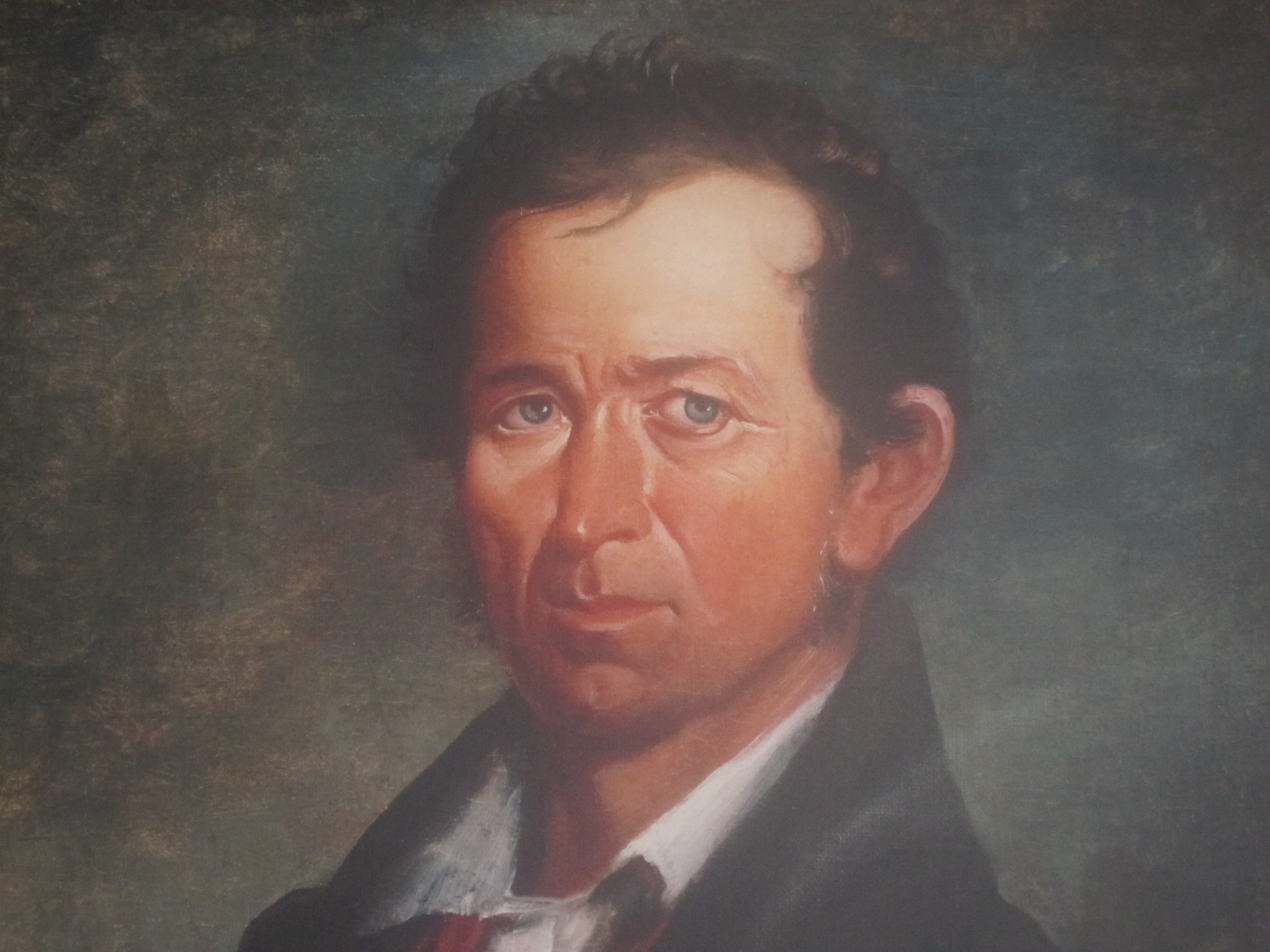
- Born: Erastus Smith; April 19, 1787; Dutchess County, New York, U.S.
- Died: November 30, 1837 (aged 50); Richmond, Republic of Texas
- Occupations: American frontiersman, Texas Revolution hero, Republic of Texas soldier, Texas Rangers
- Spouse: Guadalupe Ruiz de Durán
- Children: 3 children & 4 stepchildren

Erastus "Deaf" Smith (April 19, 1787 – November 30, 1837), who earned his nickname due to hearing loss in childhood, was an American frontiersman noted for his part in the Texas Revolution and the Army of the Republic of Texas. He fought in the Grass Fight and the Battle of San Jacinto. After the war, Deaf Smith led a company of Texas Rangers.

Smith died in Richmond, Texas, aged 50, at the home of Randall Jones. Some later accounts would give tuberculosis as the cause of death although no cause of death was given in contemporary accounts. The Episcopal churchyard has a modest marker, "Deaf Smith, the Texas Spy, Died Nov. 30, 1837", but his exact burial site is unknown.

== Posthumous legacy ==
Deaf Smith County, Texas, is named in his honor. Unlike his nickname, which was pronounced "Deef", the county name is pronounced by most residents as /ˈdɛf/ DEF. Likewise, a brand of peanut butter known as Deaf Smith was manufactured by the Arrowhead Mills company, which was founded in 1960 by Frank Ford, then from Hereford, the seat of Deaf Smith County.

Many school districts in Texas name schools after heroes of the Texas Revolution. Several schools across the state are named for Deaf Smith, including Lamar CISD's Deaf Smith Elementary in Richmond, Texas.

== In popular culture ==
- 1915, Martyrs of the Alamo, Smith was played by Sam De Grasse (as "Silent Smith")
- 1939, Man of Conquest, Smith was played by Max Terhune
- 1956, The First Texan, Smith was played by Chubby Johnson
- 1958, in "Deaf Smith" episode of The Adventures of Jim Bowie, Deaf Smith was played by Vic Perrin
- 1972, Los Amigos (Smith and Johnny Ears) is based on Smith; Anthony Quinn played the Deaf Smith character
- 1985, Smith was the subject of the play Deaf Smith: The Great Texian Scout by playwright Steven C. Baldwin.
- 1986, TV movie Houston: The Legend of Texas, Smith was played by Ivy Pryce
- 1998, TNT's TV Movie Two for Texas, Smith was played by Richard Andrew Jones
- 2004, Alamo, Smith was played by Michael Crabtree
- 2015, Texas Rising, Smith was played by Jeffrey Dean Morgan
