= José Joaquín de Arredondo =

Spanish colonial official

- Born: c. 1768; Barcelona (Catalonia, Spain)
- Died: 1837; Havana, Cuba
- Occupation: Soldier

José Joaquín de Arredondo y Mioño (also known as Jose Arredondo y Miono Pelegrin y Oceja) (1768–1837) was a 19th-century Spanish and Mexican soldier who served during the last two decades of Spanish rule in New Spain. He was military commandant of the Texas province during the first Texas revolutions against Spanish rule.

== Early life ==
Jose Joaquin de Arredondo was born in Barcelona, Spain, in 1768 to Nicolás Antonio de Arredondo y Pelegrín and Josefa Rosa de Mioño. His father served as Governor of Cuba and as Viceroy of Buenos Aires.

== Military career ==
Arredondo entered the Royal Spanish Guards as a cadet in 1787 and was detached for service in New Spain. In 1810 he was promoted to the rank of colonel and given the command of the infantry regiment of Vera Cruz. In 1811 he was made military commandant of Huasteca and governor of Nuevo Santander. Arredondo enforced a rigid interpretation of the Laws of War regarding guerrillas, partisans and insurgents. He applied his rules of warfare in proactive campaigns against Miguel Hidalgo y Costilla's revolt of 1811 and the criollos revolts of 1813, taking part in Ignacio Elizondo's plot to capture Miguel Hidalgo. Arredondo was rewarded for his actions in suppressing the revolutionaries with an appointment as commandant of the eastern division of the Provincias Internas (comprising the provinces of Coahuila, Texas, Nuevo Santander and the New Kingdom of León); the region had a predominantly royalist population (see below), and the independence movement would not be supported by a majority of the population in those provinces until the late 1810s after Servando Teresa de Mier's fight for Mexican independence.

=== Texas ===
As part of the New Kingdom of León, the area of Texas then called Tejas was a bulwark against the large-scale marauding attacks of hostile Indian nations such as the Apaches and the Comanches. Because of long-term hostility between the Indians and the Europeans in the area, much of the New Kingdom of León and Tejas had a population almost wholly European in origin, unlike other parts of New Spain. Spanish authorities supported the settlement of Tejas, the frontier of the Kingdom between Indian territory and the growing American nation. Thus, while the southern areas of the New Kingdom of León remained royalist, the northern areas were mostly ambivalent about supporting either the revolution or the royalist cause. This neutrality disappeared when independence fervor spread among the population following brutal suppression tactics by the Spanish colonial authorities and the threat of an even more absolutist government in the province.

== First Texas Rebellion ==
In 1811, José Bernardo Maximiliano Gutiérrez de Lara, an idealistic mestizo blacksmith from Nuevo Santander, dedicated himself to the Hidalgo Independence movement. With his substantial contacts in the region and his personal militancy he received a commission as a Lt. Colonel in Hidalgo's Army of the Americas and traveled to Washington, Baltimore and Philadelphia to enlist aid supporting his own goals for the independence movement in Texas. In Washington and Philadelphia he met Caribbean adventurer José Álvarez de Toledo y Dubois who was wanted by Spanish authorities in Texas. Upon both his departure and then his return trip through the Neutral Ground on the Texas-Louisiana border, Gutiérrez was encouraged by numerous sympathetic factions who supported the revolutionary cause. In Natchitoches, which had a long-standing predominantly American settlement, he made plans to invade the rest of Texas from the east. He enjoined another adventurer and former US Army Lieutenant, Colonel Augustus William Magee, to carry out the mission in the field. William Shaler, later an American consul to Havana, Europe and Algiers, as well as a writer, was attached to Gutiérrez's expedition by the United States government to oversee the revolutionaries' invasion of Spanish Texas. Shaler, a friend of Secretary of State Robert Smith, had been appointed by President James Madison as a confidential agent; he advised Gutiérrez and Magee with the direct involvement of upper levels of the American government as high as Secretary of State James Monroe; officially, however, the United States maintained a stance of disapproving the invasion.

From their headquarters in the Neutral Ground, Gutiérrez and Magee openly advertised for revolutionary recruits from Louisiana and Texas for the "Republican Army of the North". They mustered them to participate in the Gutiérrez-Magee Expedition and adopted a solid emerald green flag, thought to have been introduced by Colonel Magee, who was of Protestant Irish descent. Volunteers were offered forty dollars a month and a square league (4,428 acres) of to-be-captured land. From San Antonio the Texas governor, Manuel María de Salcedo, followed developments through his intelligence network and lobbied intensively for more aid from his superiors and comrades-in-arms south of the Rio Grande to prepare for the invasion and limit distribution of rebel propaganda. Governor Salcedo was treated condescendingly by his protocol-oriented and bureaucratic uncle, Commandant General Nemesio Salcedo.

On 12 August 1812, the Republican Army of the North, consisting of about 150 men, crossed the Sabine River and took Nacogdoches with little opposition. Capt. Bernardino Montero, the commander of Nacogdoches, was unable to recruit a single civilian militiaman for the royalist cause, as the majority of the province erupted in support of the fledgling independence movement. When he retreated toward San Antonio, all but ten of his soldiers deserted and joined the revolutionary army. By late fall the Republican Army of the North controlled the area between the Sabine and Guadalupe Rivers.

After receiving reinforcements and conducting negotiations, Salcedo and Lt. Governor Muñoz de Echavarria deployed along the Guadalupe River east of San Antonio to meet the invading Republican Army. Learning of this, Gutiérrez and Magee turned south down the Guadalupe River valley, proceeded to La Bahia where they took control without much resistance; soon after Gov. Salcedo began a prolonged siege of the Presidio La Bahia where the rebels were grouped. Neither side could budge the other, tying up the meager forces of both armies.

Following several weeks of attrition warfare, stalemate, and negotiations, Col. Magee died under uncertain circumstances, probably related to actions by Gutierrez, who didn't trust him. Meanwhile, Gov. Salcedo and Col. Simon de Herrera had lifted the siege and returned to San Antonio, leading to a further loss of confidence among the royalists and more defections. The main Republican army, now commanded by Virginian Col. Samuel Kemper, who had taken over after Magee's death, and buttressed by more recruits from the Neutral Ground and allied coastal Lipan and Tonkawa Indians, had moved along the San Antonio River towards the capital city of San Antonio, where they defeated Col. Herrera's royalist forces at the Battle of Rosillo Creek (also known as the Battle of Rosalis or the Battle of Salado Creek). When the Republican Army moved toward San Antonio, Gov. Salcedo composed a twelve-point plan of honorable surrender and delivered it to Col. Gutiérrez, who was encamped at Mission Concepcion.

The terms of the surrender were refused by Guttierrez, who ordered the execution of Herrera and several other officers even as they dined with several of the Anglo-Tejano and American officers. Gutierrez then released all the other rebel prisoners, formed a provisional government with himself as governor, and organized a tribunal which found Salcedo and Herrera guilty of treason against the Hidalgo movement, condemning them to death. The Anglo officers protested the decision and endeavored to convince the self-appointed generalissimo and governor to spare them and send them either to prison in southern Mexico or to exile in Louisiana. Instead, the prisoners were placed under the escort of the Mexican rebel Capt. Antonio Delgado who summarily executed them along with 12 others and mutilated the corpses, leaving them lying at the site without burial; even going so far as to steal their belongings. Delgado returned to San Antonio, where he boasted of the butchery, which was announced publicly on the military parade grounds.

The brutal atrocity of these events sickened most of the Anglo-Tejano and American forces supporting the independence movement; all the Anglo officers and recruits were horrified, and a party of them rushed to the execution site and gave the victims a Christian burial. Subsequently, most of the Anglo-Tejano and American officers immediately abandoned the cause and returned to eastern Texas, Louisiana and further points east. Samuel Kemper, James Gaines, Warren D.C. Hall and others were so shocked they took furloughs and returned to Nacogdoches. Nonetheless, the appeals of Col. Miguel Menchaca and other Mexican leaders persuaded some to stay and continue fighting for the cause of Mexican independence.

On 6 April 1813, Gutiérrez declared the province of Texas independent of Spain and on 18 April proclaimed the first Constitution of Texas, which was more Centralist than Republican. This only further demoralized the remaining Anglo-Tejano and American volunteers, who provided the backbone of the army. The Republican Army of the North, through influence of the putatively independent state of Texas, now initiated its plans for full-scale independence and prepared to meet a counter-offensive from the south, where outrage over the execution of Salcedo and Herrera caused previously neutral criollo forces to join the loyalist troops.

=== Arredondo's revenge ===
To meet the threat represented by the recently separated province, the Spanish crown appointed General José Joaquín de Arredondo to command the Eastern and Western Divisions of the Provincias Internas. He quickly re-organized the royalist forces, appointed new officers, drilled his troops, and awaited for additional supplies while planning for a vast implementation of his counter-insurgency tactics. The anger of the royalist criollos toward the Gutierrez regime, however, was such that many wanted quick and violent retribution by marching toward San Antonio to capture and execute the first "President Protector of the State of Texas."

Consequently, Lt. Col. Ignacio Elizondo, a one-time rebel who had been repelled by the revolutionaries' dishonorable behavior and now fought for the royalists, organized a volunteer regiment of criollos in June. Against orders, he marched his force toward San Antonio to engage the Republican Army. On 16 June, the Republican Army, under an Anglo-Tejano called Henry Perry, met and routed Elizondo's forces, which suffered 400 men killed and many prisoners taken at the Battle of Alazan Creek outside San Antonio. He retreated to the Rio Grande, where he was reprimanded by Gen. Arredondo, who nevertheless joined forces with him.

Meanwhile, the high-handed methods of Gutierrez, the mistreatment of the Spanish loyalists, and the anti-Republican policies of the Gutierrez regime had resulted in a total loss of confidence in President Gutierrez amongst the Anglo-Tejano and American community. On 4 Aug 1813, Gutiérrez was deposed by these elements, who installed their chief propagandist, a formal naval officer and member of the Spanish Cortes from Santo Domingo, José Álvarez de Toledo y Dubois.

With the Texas government paralyzed by these events, Arredondo launched his campaign. Arredondo now had about 1,800 troops in his army, buttressed with criollos who were provoked by the senseless slayings of Salcedo and his company. He immediately left for San Antonio de Bexar, resolved to apply his concepts of counter-insurgency warfare on the entire Tejano population. Heavily supplied for a long campaign, his army marched forth.

=== Battle of Medina ===
On August 18, 1813, under José Álvarez de Toledo y Dubois the Army of the North and the Royal Spanish forces under Arredondo met in the four-hour-long Battle of Medina. The Spanish Army completely destroyed the 1,400-man Army of the North. Arredondo listed enemy casualties as 600 killed, and several hundred were captured. Arredondo summarily gathered the names of the captured men, executed the rank and file, and tortured the officers for further information and then executed them, and ordered their corpses or parts of their bodies hung in trees. No effort was made to bury the remains of the Republican Army's dead, which lay on the battlefield for nine years. He later revised the number to 1,000 killed. In San Antonio, he quickly rounded up the families of the Texian soldiers, and had some of them publicly executed in the plaza of San Antonio and their heads posted on the plaza's perimeter. He spent the next year pursuing the remaining rebel leaders, including the civilian leadership of the Texas Republic, sparing few, and destroying all of the farms, buildings, and mills of the province except for a few located in San Antonio and newly built citadels such as that near Goliad. The approximately 2,500 men killed in the Republican Army's campaign exceeded the total number of Texians killed during the entire Texas Revolution twenty-three years later in 1836, and the death or expulsion of at least 3,000 other Anglo-Tejano and American settlers resulted effectively in an ethnic cleansing of the entire province.

After his victories, Arredondo appointed Cristóbal Domínguez as interim governor, and having completing his assignment in Texas, returned south to Monterrey. He subsequently crushed the filibustering expedition of Francisco Javier Mina by overrunning his defenses at the village of Soto la Marina in October 1817. He remained the primary military commander of the Coahuila and Texas area for the next several years.

== Resettlement of Texas ==
The utter crushing of the Texas province had removed the primary obstacle to the marauding Indian nations further north. Between 1817 and 1821, expeditions of Comanche and Apache Indians numbering several thousand penetrated deep into the provinces further south of Texas. Ravaged by the war of Independence and the subsequent Indian raids, the Kingdom of León fell backward in wealth and population, and along with the rest of Mexico essentially entered into a period of intense depression and anarchy.

Consequently, on January 17, 1821, General Arredondo approved the petition of Moses Austin to bring three hundred settlers into an area of 211,000 acres (850 km^{2}) in Texas. They were required officially to convert to Catholicism and provide arms and men for defending the routes into Mexico further south, although only one tenth of the settlers ever converted. Later, this settlement was expanded to encourage more emigration by Americans from the United States into northern Mexico.

=== Mexican allegiance ===
When Mexico achieved independence from Spain, Arredondo offered on July 3, 1821, to swear fealty to the new government if he could retain his office as commandant general; his offer was rejected by the citizens of Saltillo, and Agustín de Iturbide's Plan de Iguala for Mexican independence led to his removal from power. Arredondo is remembered in Texas history as a "butcher" because of his executions of republicans. When Mexico achieved independence from Spain, Arredondo endorsed the Plan of Iguala and swore allegiance to the Republic of Mexico on July 3, 1821. He surrendered his command, went into retirement in Havana, Cuba, and died in 1837 shortly after Texas had gained its independence.

== See also ==
- Timeline of the Texas Revolution
