= Battle of Medina =

Battle of the Mexican War of Independence

Coordinates: 29°06′32″N 98°32′21″W

- Part of the Mexican War of Independence
Date	August 18, 1813
Location	Medina River Valley, Texas
Result	Royalist victory

Belligerents
Spanish Empire: New Spain	Republican Army of the North; American filibusters

Commanders and leaders
Joaquín de Arredondo; Ignacio Elizondo	José Álvarez de Toledo y Dubois; Henry Perry

Strength
About 1,830	About 1,400 irregulars

Casualties and losses
55 dead	1,300 dead

The Battle of Medina was fought approximately 20 mi (32 km) south of San Antonio de Bexar (modern-day downtown San Antonio in the U.S. state of Texas) on August 18, 1813, as part of the Mexican War of Independence against Spanish authority in Mexico. Spanish troops led by General José Joaquín de Arredondo defeated republican forces (calling themselves the Republican Army of the North), consisting of Tejano-Mexican and Tejano-American revolutionaries participating in the Gutiérrez–Magee Expedition, under General José Álvarez de Toledo y Dubois. The deadliest battle in Texas history, Spanish forces lost 55 men while over 1,300 Republican soldiers perished in the bloodbath.

== Background ==
Bernardo Gutiérrez de Lara took up the effort to free Texas from Spain. Colonel Gutiérrez visited Washington, D.C., gaining some support for his plans. In 1812, Colonel Augustus Magee, who as a lieutenant had commanded U.S. Army troops guarding the border of the Neutral Ground and Spanish Texas, resigned his commission and formed the Republican Army of the North to aid the Gutiérrez–Magee Expedition. The army flew a solid emerald green flag, thought to have been introduced by Colonel Magee, who was of Scots-Irish descent.

Nacogdoches was taken on August 12, 1812, with little opposition, and on November 7, 1812, the Republican Army of the North marched into what is present-day Goliad, where they took the Presidio La Bahía. The Spanish Army soon confronted them, beginning a four-month siege. While at La Bahia, however, Colonel Magee died (February 6, 1813). After numerous battles and heavy losses, the Spanish lifted the siege and returned to San Antonio de Bexar.

On March 25, 1813, the Republican Army of the North left La Bahia for Bexar after receiving reinforcements. Colonel Samuel Kemper (brother of Reuben Kemper (another soldier very familiar with filibustering) replaced Magee, and Lt. Col. Reuben Ross was elected to second in command.

== Battle ==
There were approximately 1,400 Texians in Lara's Republican Army at the time, composed of Tejanos, Americans, Euro-Mexicans (Criollos), former Spanish Royalist soldiers aided by an auxiliary force of Indians, and at least one black slave. The army, being led by General Toledo, had camped on the north bank of the Medina River, about six miles north of Arredondo's 1,800 Royalist troops that were encamped near present-day Leming, Texas.

The battle lasted for four hours. Toledo's plan called for an ambush on the Royalist troops as they marched through a defile on the Bexar–Laredo road. Similarly, Arredondo had sent out a scouting party with some cavalry in the morning to try to determine the location of Toledo's troops. Quite accidentally, they happened upon the Republican ambush and retreated after a brief exchange of fire.

The Republican soldiers gave chase and apparently mistook the cavalry, which kicked up large clouds of dust, for the main army. It is believed that Toledo tried in vain to stop his troops from advancing. In their pursuit, they were slowed down by the sandy terrain; the guns that dragged with them became deeply mired. When they had reached the Spanish lines, they were tired and thirsty. However, they managed to rout some Spanish artillery units and were attempting a flanking maneuver when they were repulsed by Spanish cavalry units. The situation had been less than clear for Arredondo, who was prepared to order his troops to fall back when he seems to have been informed by a defector that the Republican troops were also attempting to disengage because of exhaustion. He then ordered an advance instead.

The Republicans fled in disorder. Toledo, and a few of his associates headed straight for Louisiana. Some of the combatants stopped in San Antonio just long enough to gather their families. The Spanish army continued to press, killing many of the fleeing soldiers. Most of the remainder were captured and summarily executed in a reprisal for the previous executions of Manuel María de Salcedo, Simón de Herrera, and the prisoners of The Battle of Rosillo Creek. Fewer than 100 out of 1,400 soldiers on the Republican side survived, and the Royalists lost only 55 men. The remains of the Republican troops were left to rot and were not buried until 1822 when José Félix Trespalacios, the first governor of Coahuila y Tejas under the newly established United Mexican States, ordered a detachment of soldiers to gather their bones and bury them honorably under an oak tree that grew on the battlefield.

Some of the Gutiérrez-Magee participants either were sons of American revolutionaries or had fought with Andrew Jackson in the War of 1812, and of the few who survived, some fought again during the second Texas Revolution (1835–36). José Antonio Navarro, a founding father of Texas, and José Francisco Ruiz, both future signers of the 1836 Texas Declaration of Independence, took part in the 1812-13 Magee, Gutiérrez and Toledo resistance movements and later served as leaders in the Texas Revolution.

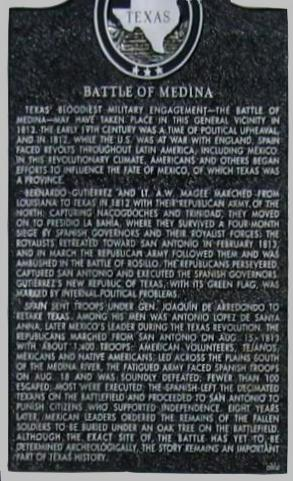
Marker placed at one possible site of the battle near Leming, Texas

One of the dead, Peter Sides, was a veteran of the American Revolution. Sides (originally Seitz) was about 62 when he marched off from his home in Baton Rouge, Louisiana with Magee and the other revolutionaries. A native of North Carolina of German ancestry, Seitz was a career soldier who fought in the first militia at Nashborough and in Logan County, Kentucky before he and his family relocated to Baton Rouge in 1799. Markers from the Daughters of the American Revolution and the Daughters of the Republic of Texas have been placed on the battle site in Sides's honor.

Nearly all of the names of the other 1,300 or so dead from the Republic Army of the North have been lost to history.

Of a note is a young lieutenant, Antonio López de Santa Anna, who fought in the battle and followed his superiors' orders of taking no prisoners. That heavily influenced how he would fight wars for the rest of his life, most infamously during the Texas Revolution at the Alamo and Goliad.

== Battlefield markers ==
The location of the Battle of Medina has not been archaeologically determined. There are three historical markers for the battle:

- The first marker was placed by the State of Texas for the 1936 Texas Centennial at the southeast corner of U.S. Route 281 and Farm to Market Road 2537 in Bexar County.
- The second marker was placed by the State of Texas in 2005 at the corner of Old Applewhite Road and Bruce Road in Atascosa County (29.1087005 N, 98.5386008 W).
- The third marker was placed by Robert P. Marshall in 2013 on Old Pleasanton Road south of the intersection with Bruce Road. This marker is based on his own research and not recognized by the state.

== See also ==
- Battle of Rosillo Creek
- History of Texas

== Notes ==
- del la Teja, Jesus (1991), A Revolution Remembered: The Memoirs and Selected Correspondence of Juan N. Seguin, Austin, Texas: State House Press, ISBN 0-938349-68-6
- Edmondson, J. R. (2000), The Alamo Story-From History to Current Conflicts, Plano, Texas: Republic of Texas Press, ISBN 1-55622-678-0
- Arellano, Dan (2006), Tejano Roots, A Family Legend, Texas: Republic of Texas Press, ISBN 0-615-12994-3
