= Battle of Alazan Creek =

Battle of the Mexican War of Independence

Coordinates: 29.4264°N 98.5130°W

The Battle of Alazan Creek, occurred on the banks of Alazan Creek in Spanish Texas on June 20, 1813, during the Mexican War of Independence. The location is today in Bexar County, Texas, in the United States, just west of downtown San Antonio (formerly San Antonio del Bejar).

== See also ==
- Salado Creek
- Battle of Rosillo Creek
- Battle of Medina
- Manuel María de Salcedo
- Gutiérrez–Magee Expedition
- History of Texas
- Samuel Kemper
- Reuben Kemper

== Sources ==
- Arredondo, José Joaquín de; Hatcher, Mattie Austin (January 1908). "Report of The Battle of Medina by Spanish participant Joaquin de Arredondo". Texas Historical Association Quarterly. XI (3): 200–236.
- Garrett, Julia Kathryn (1969). Green Flag Over Texas. New York, N.Y.: Cordova Press.
