= Manuel María de Salcedo =

Governor of Spanish Texas (1808–1813)

32nd Governor of the Spanish Colony of Texas
- In office 1808–1813
- Lieutenant: Mariano Valera
- Preceded by: Manuel Antonio Cordero y Bustamante
- Succeeded by: Juan Bautista de las Casas

Personal details
- Born: April 3, 1776 Málaga, Spain
- Died: April 3, 1813 (aged 37) San Antonio de Béjar, Spanish Texas, New Spain, Spanish Empire
- Profession: Military and political leader

Manuel María de Salcedo y Quiroga (1776 in Málaga, Spain – executed, April 3, 1813) was a governor of New Philippines from 1808 until his execution in 1813. Salcedo gained leadership experience helping his father Juan Manuel de Salcedo, the 11th and last Spanish governor of Louisiana, (1801–November 30, 1803, when it was handed back to the French). In 1807, the younger Salcedo was appointed governor of Texas, and he officially assumed that role on November 7, 1808. As governor, he and his uncle Nemesio Salcedo, the Commandant General of the Interior Provinces, often disagreed, especially on immigration issues.

Salcedo was overthrown by Juan Bautista de las Casas in January 1811 and imprisoned for several months in Monclova. After he persuaded his captor, Ignacio Elizondo, to switch allegiances, Salcedo assisted in capturing documents detailing the movements of Miguel Hidalgo's army. The rebel army was captured one week later, and Salcedo led the military tribunal which eventually sentenced the rebel leaders to death. After fulfilling his duties with the tribunal Salcedo returned to Texas, but he did not resume his duties for several months as a result of a dispute with his uncle and whether he was at fault for his own capture.

In 1812, Salcedo led the Spanish army in Texas against the filibusters calling themselves the Republican Army of the North. He was never able to defeat that army, and he surrendered on April 2, 1813. Despite assurances that he would be imprisoned, extremists of the filibuster forces executed him the following day. To avenge Salcedo's death, the Spanish army quickly reconquered Texas and dealt harshly with any they suspected of treason.

== Early years ==
Coat of Arms of Manuel María de Salcedo

Manuel María de Salcedo was born in Málaga, Spain, on April 3, 1776, to Juan Manuel de Salcedo and Francisca de Quiroga y Manso. When he was seven, Salcedo enrolled at the Royal Academy of Ocana, later transferring to the Royal Seminary of Nobles, where he trained until he was 17. Salcedo then joined the infantry, where he reached the rank of lieutenant and served under his father at Santa Cruz de Tenerife in the Canary Islands. In 1801, his father became the governor of Spanish Louisiana, and Salcedo accompanied him to New Orleans.

In New Orleans, Salcedo served as a boundary commissioner as Spain prepared to transfer the colony back to France. He married in 1803 to a local woman of Spanish and French ancestry, Maria Guadalupe Prietto y la Ronde. They returned to Spain the following year after Napoleon transferred Louisiana to the United States through the Louisiana Purchase.

== Appointment as governor ==
While living in Spain, Salcedo was appointed the governor of Spanish Texas. At this time, Texas was a sparsely populated province consisting of three primary settlements connected by the Camino Real, with a few presidios and over a dozen missions scattered throughout the wilderness. The province was bordered on the south and west by the Nueces and Medina Rivers, with the Red River comprising its northern and eastern border. The capital was the villa of San Fernando, commonly called San Antonio de Bexar after the local presidio, Presidio San Antonio de Bexar. Approximately 2,500 people, including soldiers, lived in San Antonio, with an additional 600 residents at La Bahia and about 770 people in Nacogdoches.

As governor, Salcedo would be the representative of the Spanish king in Texas. As a deputy of the Commandant General of the Interior Provinces, at this time his uncle, Nemesio Salcedo, the governor was the military commander for the province and had the power to appoint lieutenants and corporals to oversee the presidios and mission defenses. He would also serve as the civil administrator, and had final approval of the results of all elections.

Salcedo took a preliminary oath of office on May 1, 1807, and he and his wife and daughter left for North America. The family traveled by boat to New Bedford, Massachusetts, where they took a stagecoach to Providence, Rhode Island, and New Haven, Connecticut. They also visited New York City, Philadelphia, and Pittsburgh before cruising down the Ohio and Mississippi Rivers to Natchez and then traveling overland to Texas. Salcedo officially assumed the governorship of the province on November 7, 1808.

== Early governorship ==
In his first year in office, Salcedo faced many issues, often pitting himself against his uncle, Nemesio Salcedo. After visiting with the Americans for so many months, Salcedo warned of "the aggressive spirit of Anglo-American frontiersmen." To minimize the threat to the Spanish borderlands, Salcedo recommended that Texas welcome more settlers and soldiers to the area. He recommended that immigrants who could demonstrate their loyalty to Spain be welcomed into the province, including men deserting from the U.S. Army. His uncle instead ordered the border be closed to all people from Louisiana, regardless of their ethnic background. Despite the order, Salcedo still permitted slave owners from the U.S. to enter Texas in order to reclaim runaway slaves.

Money was continually tight in the province, with little coming from the interior provinces. At one point, Salcedo became desperate enough for funds that he asked citizens in the province to donate money to pay the troops who helped protect them. He also continued to receive complaints and reprimands from his uncle, who "commended almost every high-ranking officer in the borderlands except" for Salcedo.

After almost eighteen months in office, Salcedo decided to inspect other areas of the province. He left San Antonio de Bexar on March 11, 1810, to tour East Texas. The United States and Spain were contesting the location of the border between Louisiana and Texas, and in response the local military commanders had declared the area between the Sabine River and the Red River to be a neutral ground which neither army would cross. As a result, this section of land became a haven for outlaws. While visiting Nacogdoches, Salcedo recommended that Spanish troops combine with an equal number of American soldiers to mount an offensive against the bandits. He also personally interrogated the heads of new immigrant families to the area to determine whether they would be loyal to Spain.

After returning to San Antonio, Salcedo learned that the Central Junta of Seville had issued an edict inviting Hispanic colonists overseas to send representatives to the junta. The people of San Antonio promptly elected Salcedo to represent them. Nemesio Salcedo invalidated the election on the pretext that San Antonio did not have a cabildo, which was a prerequisite for balloting. Salcedo soothed the people of San Antonio by explaining that his primary obligation as governor of Texas required his presence in Texas. Instead, Texas would be represented by Coahuila's representative, Antonio Cordero.

== Hidalgo revolution ==
=== Revolt ===
Salcedo left for a tour of the southern part of Texas on September 12, 1810. Four days later, Father Miguel Hidalgo launched a revolution in Mexico. Hidalgo believed that only people born in New Spain knew what was best for the area, and he claimed to also want to govern in the name of deposed king Ferdinand VII of Spain. His goal was to inflame the northernmost provinces, especially Texas, in the hopes that his cause might win the support of the United States. When news of the revolt reached East Texas, many of the colonists fled into Louisiana, afraid the presidio would be unable to protect them. Salcedo offered a blanket amnesty to the settlers if they would return to Texas by November 1.

Salcedo returned to San Antonio de Bexar in late October and began making plans to protect Texas. He requested permission to create a militia with 200 local gentry from Texas to help patrol Texas, but this was denied. To guard against the spread of seditious literature, Salcedo instructed the San Antonio postmaster, Erasmo Seguín, to hold all incoming and outgoing mail pouches until they had been inspected by the governor. This privacy infringement was not publicized. When the amnesty for East Texas settlers expired, Salcedo also ordered the borders closed and all settlers in the province confined to the immediate vicinity of their homes. Both the confinement and the mail reading were overturned by Nemesio Salcedo as being too strict. To improve response time, however, Nemesio Salcedo did authorize his nephew to open any correspondence from the United States that was addressed to the commandant general.

At the end of November, Salcedo received a message from the viceroy of New Spain instructing him that Hidalgo and his confederates Ignacio Allende and Juan Aldama were expected to invade Texas, and that Salcedo was expected to capture them. This posed difficulty for Salcedo, whose soldiers were operating without needed supplies, some not even having flints for their firearms, and many members of the cavalry were without horses. Eager to find a solution, Salcedo attempted to recruit 200 Lipan Apache warriors to fight with them, but the deal fell through. Further stretching his resources, Salcedo sent 100 soldiers to Saltillo to assist in fending off the insurrectionists fighting in Coahuila.

In December, Salcedo sent his wife and daughter from San Antonio to keep them safe. On January 2, he summoned all 300 troops in Bexar and informed them that they would be traveling to the Rio Grande to more effectively defend the province. This ignited rumors that Salcedo was planning to abandon the province. Four days later, Salcedo was forced to publish a proclamation to all inhabitants of the province, appealing for support for the royalists and denying that Spanish authorities intended to abandon New Spain.

Within the next several days, Coahuila surrendered to the rebels. On January 15, rebels launched an attempt to seize the Texas government; the plot was uncovered and the conspirators, including a lieutenant in the army, were arrested. Salcedo then canceled his orders to send the troops to the Rio Grande so that they could instead protect the capital. He also issued a declaration to the citizens of San Antonio to warn them that helping the rebels was treason.

=== Capture ===
On January 21, Juan Bautista de las Casas, a retired militia captain from Nuevo Santander led a group of army sergeants to stage a coup in San Antonio de Bexar. The following morning they arrested Salcedo and his entire military staff. Even as Salcedo was led to detention however, the rebellious soldiers instinctively saluted him. Las Casas chained Salcedo, Simón de Herrera, the governor of Nuevo Santander who was living in San Antonio, and twelve other Spanish officers and humiliated them in front of the town. The prisoners were then transferred to Monclova in Coahuila.

The rest of Texas was quickly revolutionized. There was little resistance in Nacogdoches, where the presidio commander was arrested, or in La Bahia. Las Casas promptly confiscated property belonging to Spanish residents, proclaimed himself the head of a provisional government, released political prisoners and jailed royalists. His arbitrary rule disenchanted much of the army, and Juan Manuel Zambrano, the subdeacon of San Antonio, soon led a counter-insurgency against him. On March 2, Zambrano and his royalists marched on the government house. Las Casas surrendered without a fight, just 39 days after taking over. Zambrano reestablished royalist control of the province and sent a messenger to inform those holding Salcedo.

=== Victory ===
During his captivity, Salcedo had been slowly enticing Ignacio Elizondo (his captor), with promises of a promotion and other rewards if he would renounce his revolutionary tendencies. After receiving Zambrano's message, Salcedo's captor changed sides again. With his help, on March 13, Salcedo and his military officers were able to capture Pedro de Aranda, who held documents detailing the movements of the revolutionary army. One week later, Salcedo led a group which captured much of Hidalgo's army, as well as 27 rebel leaders. Salcedo accompanied the captured leaders from Monclova to Chihuahua, the headquarters of the Commandant General. On April 26, 1811, the Commandant General appointed Salcedo to be president of a seven-member tribunal to try the revolutionaries. The men were quickly sentenced to death by firing squad.

Loyalists in Coahuila quickly judged, convicted, and executed the prisoners captured in San Antonio de Bexar. Las Casas's head was shipped to San Antonio and displayed on a pole in the military plaza. With Salcedo still in Chihuahua, Zambrano administered the province. Among his accomplishments during this time was to inaugurate the first primary school in San Antonio.

The royalists were amply rewarded for their work. San Antonio was elevated from a villa to a ciudad. Those who participated in the royalists junta were given either promotions or cash payments. Salcedo was the only one of the royalists to not receive any special awards or honors. He angrily protested to the Commandant General and requested a military inquiry into the events surrounding his capture, hoping to be exonerated. Nemesio Salcedo refused to convene and inquiry, declaring that Salcedo had simply been caught off guard. Although Salcedo returned to San Antonio on September 11, 1811, he refused to assume his duties as governor. Nemesio Salcedo finally told him that the higher authorities trusted him with the assignment or else he would not have been allowed to return to Texas, and thus any other promotions or compensation were superfluous. The lack of that compensation, however, lessened Salcedo's standing in the eyes of many of the residents of the province, with some refusing to follow verbal directives from the governor.

== Defeat ==
Salcedo resumed his command on December 15. Revolutionary tendencies were still high, and on February 12, 1812, Salcedo appointed a military council on public safety to oversee cases of sedition. As usual, there was a shortage of funds and horses within the province. Salcedo ignored protocol and wrote directly to the viceroy of New Spain about troop strength levels in Texas, including copies of documents which had been sent to the Commandant General in previous pleas. At this time, there were only an estimated 1,137 troops in the province.

During this time, revolutionary Bernardo Gutiérrez de Lara traveled to the United States to try to gain support for overthrowing the royalists in Mexico. With former U.S. Army lieutenant Augustus Magee and William Shaler, Gutiérrez advertised for armed support in Louisiana and Natchez, Mississippi Territory, calling themselves the Republican Army of the North. The Republican Army of the North gathered in the Neutral Ground, and in early August 1812 they crossed the Sabine River into Texas. Most of the soldiers in Nacogdoches were away from the fort, and it fell on August 11 with no resistance. After receiving conflicting information about the size of the rebel army, the Spanish soldiers retreated west. The retreat was disorganized, and many of the enlisted men deserted and returned to Nacogdoches to join the filibusters. By mid-August, the rebels nominally controlled all of the land east of the Guadalupe River.

To attract recruits, the filibusters offered $40 per month plus a Spanish league of land (4428 acres) to all volunteers. By September their army numbered 780. The Spanish army in Texas was almost twice as large at this point. On November 2, Salcedo led the majority of these forces to the Guadalupe in the hopes of ambushing the invaders. One of his soldiers was captured, however, and revealed details of the ambush. The invading army turned south to avoid the trap, and instead captured Presidio La Bahía. Salcedo promptly began a siege of the presidio.

Unable to win a decisive victory, Salcedo lifted the siege on February 19, 1813, and returned towards San Antonio de Bexar. During the retreat, many of the soldiers defected and joined the Republican Army of the North. The two armies met along Salado Creek at the Battle of Rosillo Creek. After a 15-minute battle, the Spanish Army broke ranks and, in March, once again retreated toward San Antonio. Indians who had allied with the victorious rebels chased down many of the fugitives and slaughtered them. In total, 330 royalists were killed, while only 6 republicans died.

Back in San Antonio, Salcedo and the Royalists assumed a defensive position in and around the Alamo and waited for an assault. It was not a long wait. As news of the republican victory reached the east, new recruits began to pour into La Bahia; and, thus reinforced, Samuel Kemper (in command after the death of Magee) soon struck out in pursuit of Salcedo's force.

At Bexar, a decisive battle ended with the Royalists being driven back into the Alamo. With the tables turned so that Salcedo was now under siege, he asked for terms. Kemper replied that if they were to surrender, there would be no reprisals, the soldiers would simply be disbanded and the officers would be released "on their own parole."

On April 2, Salcedo and 14 members of his staff surrendered. Salcedo tried twice to officially present his sword to Anglo-American officers. Following their own protocol, the Americans refused to accept his surrender and gestured that he must present it to Gutiérrez. Salcedo instead stuck his sword in the ground and stepped back. Gutiérrez declared himself head of a provisional government and appointed a junta to deliberate charges against Salcedo and the other royalists.

In part due to urging of a certain Captain Antonio Delgado who demanded vengeance against Salcedo for the death of his father, they were quickly found guilty of treachery to the Hidalgo movement and sentenced to death.

When Samuel Kemper and the other Americans objected to this as a betrayal of the terms offered the Royalists, Gutiérrez suggested that Salcedo and his Spanish officers be taken to the Gulf coast and from there sent by ship to New Orleans for parole. Kemper agreed to this and so, escorted by a company of rebel soldiers, Salcedo and the officers were dispatched toward the coast. But Gutiérrez had apparently entered into a plot with Delgado, and Delgado was in command of the escort.

On the night of April 3 (Salcedo's birthday), some 10 miles southwest of Béxar, near the site of the Rosillo Creek battle, the column was halted. Telling Salcedo that they were about to die, all the prisoners were bound hand and foot. After some taunting, they were made to kneel with their hands tied behind their backs. Then, Delgado himself stepped up behind each of them, and one by one, mercilessly slit their throats.

Their bodies were left on the ground for the vultures, but Salcedo's body was retrieved by Father José Dario Zambrano and buried at the San Fernando Church on August 28.

== Aftermath ==
The morning after Salcedo's death, the rebels announced what they had done. Most of the Anglo-American leaders of the movement disavowed the murder and many began leaving. Spanish officials decided to reconquer Texas, and to speed their response the viceroy created a new administrative unit, the Commandancy General of the Eastern Interior Provinces, headquartered in Monterrey. San Antonio de Bexar was retaken on August 18. The new commandant general, José Joaquín de Arredondo, entered the city two days later and immediately arrested 700 male residents. The filibuster army was defeated at the battle of Medina, and those rebels who managed to escape the battle fled into the Neutral Ground.

Arredondo threatened immediate execution for anyone who crossed into Texas, and for three years few people attempted it. For the next four years, Texas had several ad interim governors, until Antonio María Martínez became the last governor of Spanish Texas.
