= Gutiérrez–Magee Expedition =

Filibuster war in North America

- Part of the Mexican War of Independence
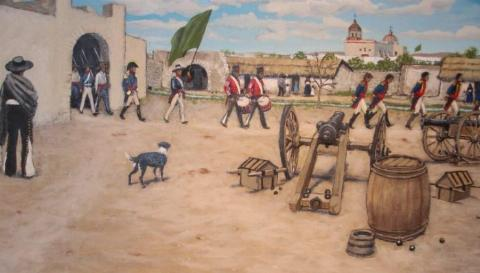
- Early 20th-century depiction of the Republican Army of the North
Date	8 August 1812 – 18 August 1813
Location	Spanish Texas
Result	Royalist victory

Belligerents
Spanish Empire: Viceroyalty of New Spain	Republican Army of the North: Mexican insurgents; American filibusters

Commanders and leaders
Manuel María de Salcedo (executed); Simón de Herrera (executed); Joaquín de Arredondo; Ignacio Elizondo	Bernardo Gutiérrez de Lara; Augustus W. Magee # Samuel Kemper; José Álvarez de Toledo y Dubois

Strength
~1,800	~1,400

Casualties and losses
~300–400 killed	~1,300 killed

The Gutiérrez–Magee Expedition or Texan Revolt of 1812–1813 was a joint Mexican and American military campaign during the early years of the Mexican War of Independence. Led nominally by the Mexican insurgent Bernardo Gutiérrez de Lara, with initial military command by the American officer Augustus William Magee, the Ejército Republicano del Norte (Republican Army of the North) crossed from Louisiana into Spanish Texas, captured key settlements including Nacogdoches and San Antonio, and briefly established a provisional government that declared Texas independent from Spain. The expedition ended in decisive defeat at the Battle of Medina, the bloodiest engagement ever fought on Texas soil.

Interpretations of the campaign have long reflected differing national perspectives. In Mexican historiography it is generally seen as an important part of the northern front of the independence struggle, highlighting Gutiérrez de Lara’s role and Tejano participation. Anglo-American accounts, by contrast, have traditionally emphasized its character as a filibustering enterprise driven by American volunteers, and early expansionist impulses, sometimes presenting it as a precursor to the Texas Revolution of 1835–1836.

== Background ==
In 1810, the Mexican War of Independence erupted when parish priest Miguel Hidalgo y Costilla called for an end to Spanish rule. The revolt quickly spread from central Mexico northward. 1811, independence sympathizer, Juan Bautista de las Casas led a uprising in San Antonio de Béxar, briefly seizing Governor Manuel María de Salcedo and other royalist officials The Spanish struck back, however, crushing the revolt. Governor Salcedo was restored to power. Father Hidalgo and most rebel leaders were executed in July, in Chihuahua, while de las Casas and his associates were executed in August.

Before Hidalgo's capture Bernardo Gutiérrez de Lara, a blacksmith from Nuevo Santander, offered his services and personal fortune to the rebel leaders. The leaders aware that de las Casas was capture alongside emissary Ignacio Almada commissioned Gutiérrez as plenipotentiary to the United States.

Gutiérrez arrived in Washington, D.C. on 11 December 1811, he met Secretary of State James Monroe and several other officials. After his meetings, which yield sympathy, but limited concrete commitments, Gutiérrez returned to Louisiana, accompany by José Álvarez de Toledo y Dubois, a Spanish exiled that favored independence for Spain's American possessions. Back in Louisiana, working with U.S. commercial agent William Shaler, they intensified recruitment and propaganda efforts, assembling volunteers for what would become the Republican Army of the North.

== Initial victories ==
Gutiérrez gained the support of Augustus Magee and formed a force of 130 men at Natchitoches. In early August, The men then crossed into Spanish Texas and captured the town of Nacogdoches. In Texas their numbers increased to 300, and they proceeded to take the town of Santísima Trinidad de Salcedo, on 13 September. Their success would push them on; they traveled southward, to conquer the next Spanish stronghold.

The Spanish governor Manuel María de Salcedo, with about 800 men, was patrolling the Guadalupe River area, in search of the revolutionaries. He later found them on the lower San Antonio River at Goliad. They had easily taken and were controlling the Spanish fort there, Presidio La Bahia. Magee was besieged for four months. He negotiated with the Spanish military leaders and considered surrendering, but he finally decided to fight. However, Magee's army lost confidence in him, and discord spread among the republican leaders. Magee died on 6 February 1813, following a long illness, and Samuel Kemper succeeded to the command. Captain John McFarland was sent to find new recruits: volunteers from Nacogdoches, Spanish army defectors, and a few Coushatta Indians joined in.

Kemper beat back the governor's attacks. On 10 and 13 February, Kemper successfully defeated Salcedo, who retreated toward San Antonio on 19 February. In March, Kemper's forces again swelled, by some 500 men. The expedition would pursue the Spanish, now in Béxar. Joining the Republican Army in the pursuit to were volunteers, consisting of Americans, Tejanos, former Spanish soldiers, and Lipan and Tonkawa Indians. On 29 March they defeated Simón de Herrera's Spanish army of 1,200 men, at the Battle of Rosillo Creek. Governor Salcedo surrendered on 1 April 1813. Gutiérrez suggested the prisoners be sent to the United States for safe keeping. But, as the prisoners were marched out of town by Captain Antonio Delgado, they were halted, tied to trees and killed.

== First Republic of Texas ==
In the wake of these victories, as the army's simple, unadorned solid green banner was raised over San Antonio, Gutiérrez proclaimed himself President Protector and declared the independence of Texas on 6 April 1813. Little over a week later, he moved to stablished a provisional government and on 17 April the new constitution formally stablished the Spanish province as the Estado de Texas, a part of a broader Mexican Republic.

=== Provisional government ===
The constitution outlined a hybrid republican framework with 18 articles designed for wartime conditions. Key provisions included:

- The Junta: An assembly that served as the central legislative body.
- The Governor: Gutiérrez was named Governor and Commander-in-chief. He was responsible for defense, public order and execution of laws.
- Local administrations: San Antonio (referred in the constitution as San Fernando) was designed as the seat of government and residence of all public officials.
- Judiciary: An Audiencia headed by a judge appointed by the Junta, handled civil and criminal cases.

The constitution also emphasized continuity with some Mexican tradition while introducing republican principles:

- Roman Catholicism was to remained the official religion.
- Private property was declare inviolable with compensation required for any public taking.
- Personal liberty was protected, requiring formal accusation, witness examination, and due processes. Except in wartime where the Junta and the governor could act decisively.

During its brief existence, the provisional government focused on consolidating control, organizing the army, securing supplies and maintaining alliance with local and indigenous supporters. It operated in a diverse multilingual administrative environment, with Governor Gutierrez being assisted by Spanish and English speaking clerks. However, the government faced immediate internal strains. The controversial execution of Spanish prisoners after the fall on San Antonio alienated some supporters with Kemper quitting and leading about 100 Americans back to Louisiana. Further factional tensions grew between those loyal to Gutiérrez and American participants influenced by U.S. agent William Shaler, who favored different priorities.

=== Internal divisions ===
Shalar saw José Álvarez de Toledo y Dubois as a better vehicle for protecting American interest. From Natchitones, Toledo and Shaler, initiated a propaganda campaign against Gutiérrez, with two short-lived bilingual newspapers, Gaceta de Tejas and El Mejicano explicitly designed to attacked Gutiérrez. At the same time Henry Adams Bullard, Gutiérrez's own secretary of state acted as an internal agent for Toledo advocating for him to the Junta. Soon American officers increasingly countermanded Gutierrez's orders. On June 20, Republican forces routed Colonel Ignacio Elizondo's troops in a dawn attack, at the Battle of Alazan Creek, but refused to continued the planned march to further occupy town near the Rio Grande. Gutiérrez accused the Americans of criminal inactive aimed at seizing Texas for themselves. Toledo entered San Antonio on 1 August and on 4 August, the Junta formally asked Gutierrez to resigned, he complied and left with his family for Natchitoches on 6 August as Toledo assumed governorship and the army's command.

== Battle of Medina ==
As Royalist forces of about 1,830 men under General Joaquín de Arredondo prepared a powerful counteroffensive, the Republican Army's dissension persisted. Colonel Miguel Menchaca, a prominent Tejano officer fomented discontent as he strongly opposed Toledo's elevation viewing him as a Gachupín and therefore an enemy of Mexican Independence. Nonetheless, Menchaca retained command of the Mexican division while a returning Kemper assumed command of the Anglo-American division. Toledo, urged by the locals who wished to spare San Antonio the destruction of urban combat, marched south with roughly 1,400 men towards a sandy oak forest known as El Encinal de Medina.

Royalist scouts under Elizondo flushed the republican lines and simulated a retreat. Acting against Toledo’s explicit orders, both Kemper and Menchacada pursued the cavalry detachment through deep sand for several hours, mistaking it for the main royalist army. The exhausted, overheated, and thirsty republicans were drawn directly into Arredondo’s prepared ambush

A furious four-hour battle ensued involving infantry, cavalry, and artillery. The death of Colonel Menchaca caused the Mexican line to break and the republican army collapsed into a rout. Most of those not killed on the field were pursued and executed during the retreat. Fewer than 100 republicans escaped alive while Arredondo lost only 55 men. Kemper who had escaped the battlefield with other mounted officers, briefly attempted to organize a defense at Nacogdoches before abandoning Texas just as Toledo had done immediately after the defeat.

== Aftermath ==
Arredondo entered San Antonio on 20 August 1813 and immediately imposed martial law. He established a summary tribunal that condemned suspected rebels, collaborators, and sympathizers to death. To “cleanse” the province of insurgents, Arredondo dispatched cavalry detachments toward Nacogdoches and the Sabine River border. Many residents of eastern Texas fled to Louisiana, leaving settlements largely abandoned. Future signers of the 1836 Texas Declaration of Independence José Francisco Ruiz and José Antonio Navarro were among those who fled.

By the time Mexico had achieved independence, José Félix Trespalacios, the governor of the newly formed state of Coauhila y Texas ordered a detachment to collect the remains of those killed at Medina and bury them honorably under an oak tree on the site. Meanwhile, Bernardo Gutiérrez de Lara once again exercised authority over the region as Commandant General of the Eastern Division of the Inner Provinces (encompassing Tamaulipas, Nuevo León, and Coahuila y Texas)

== See also ==
- Mexican Texas
- River pirate
- British invasions of the River Plate
