= Ignacio Elizondo =

Spanish royalist military officer

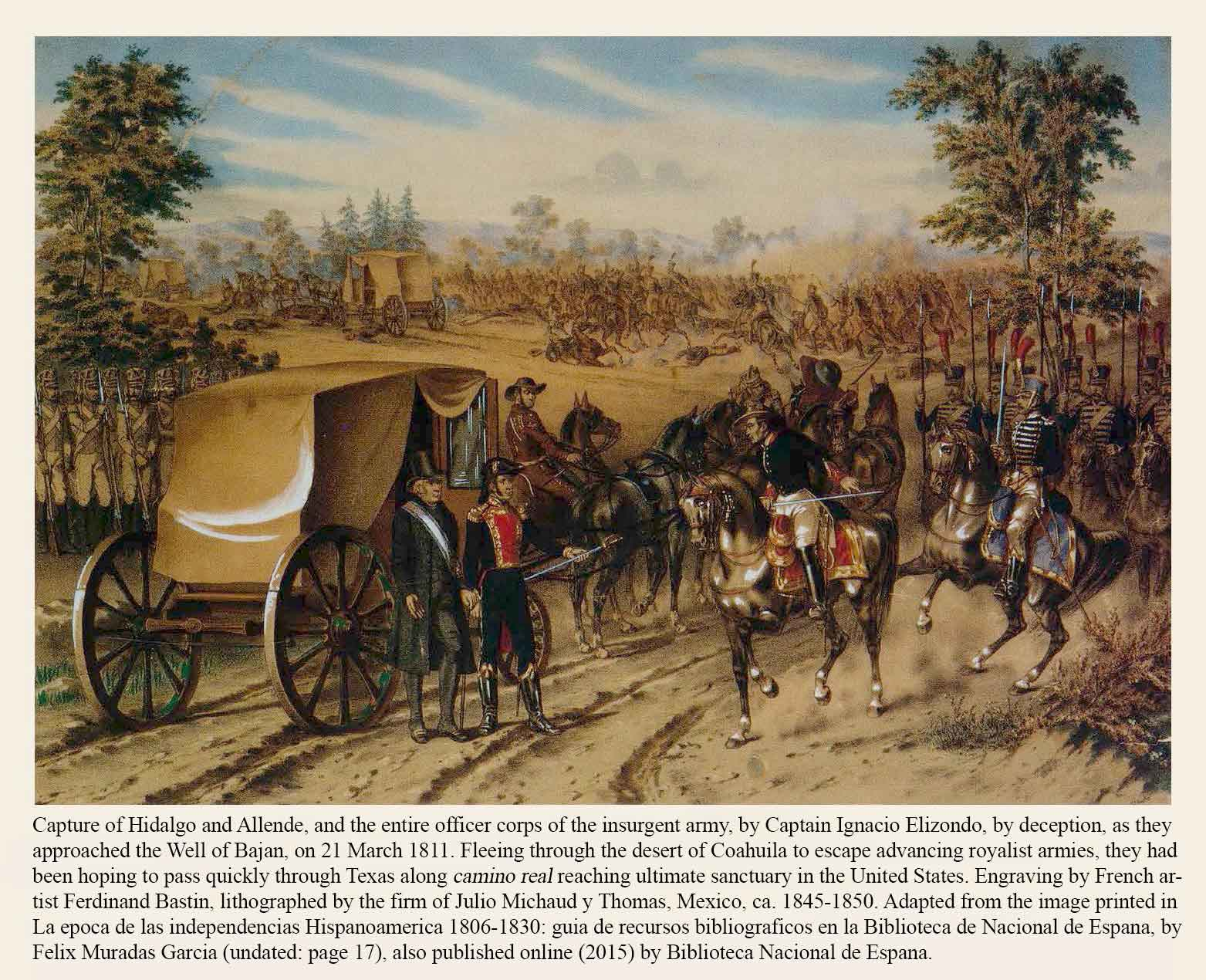
- Captain Ignacio Elizondo [center horseman] captures Hidalgo, Allende and other insurgent leaders at the Wells of Bajan on 21 March 1811.
- Born: Francisco Ignacio de Elizondo Villarreal; March 9, 1766; Salinas Valley, New Kingdom of León, New Spain (now Salinas Victoria, Nuevo León, Mexico)
- Died: c. September 12, 1813; San Marcos, New Philippines (now Texas, U.S.)
- Occupation: Military

Francisco Ignacio de Elizondo Villarreal (March 9, 1766 - c. September 12, 1813) was a royalist military officer during the Mexican war of independence against Spain. He is mostly known for his capture of insurgent leaders Miguel Hidalgo, Ignacio Allende, José Mariano Jiménez, and Juan Aldama at the Wells of Baján, Coahuila in 1811. Initially a supporter of Mexican independence who converted to the royalist cause, Elizondo is sometimes compared to the American Benedict Arnold. In 1813, after a successful campaign against rebel armies he was assassinated by one of his junior officers.

== Personal life ==
Elizondo was born in the village of Salinas (now Salinas Victoria, Nuevo León). He was son of José Marcos de Elizondo and María Josefa de Villarreal. He was of Spanish and Basque ancestry. During his childhood, Elizondo lived in the village of Pesquería Grande (present-day Garcia, Nuevo León). His father owned many agricultural estates (haciendas). In 1787, at the age of twenty-one he married María Gertrudis. She died on March 6, 1797, while giving birth to his son, José Rafael Eusebio.

Ignacio Elizondo began his military career in 1798, after being appointed Lieutenant of Pesquería's provincial militia company. Two years later, he was appointed Captain of the Punta de Lampazos provincial dragoons, one of the largest military units in the New Kingdom of León, present day Nuevo Leon. One year later Elizondo returned again to his former position at Pesquería's provincial militia. In 1806, the governor of Nuevo León, Pedro de Herrera y Levya, appointed him to command the Eighth Dragoons, a company, which would operate in Texas against the frequent Apache attacks taking place. Elizondo requested from the Viceroy an exemption from his military command as he was having serious financial problems. He owed money to the Roman Catholic church for livestock and land he had purchased. However, Governor de Herrera, declined to exempt him from his military duties which caused friction between the two men. He subsequently married Maria Romana Carrasco and, in 1806, the couple moved to the Hacienda of San Juan de Canoas, in Coahuila state, where he also administrated the Hacienda of Alamo near the city of Monclova.

== Capturing Hidalgo ==
The Mexican War of Independence from Spain began with the "grito" of the Roman Catholic priest, Miguel Hidalgo y Costilla, on September 16, 1810. Initially Elizondo, stationed in Texas, took the side of the rebels in the Casas Revolt. Elizondo had the responsibility of guarding royalist prisoners in Monclova, Coahuila. There, or possibly earlier, he was persuaded to join the royalists. Some historians debate whether General Ramon Díaz de Bustamante or Bishop Primo Feliciano Marín de Porras won Elizondo over to the royalists. Others believe he was converted by Manuel María de Salcedo of Texas and Simón de Herrera of Nuevo León, while the two royalist governors were his prisoners.

Elizondo was asked to continue to pretend to support the rebels to gain intelligence about the plans of Allende and Hidalgo who were then in flight toward the United States after a military defeat in the Battle of Calderon Bridge. In March 1811, Hidalgo and Allende, rebel military leaders, and the remnants of the rebel army were in Saltillo, 160 kilometres (99 miles) south of Monclova. The royalist sympathizers in Monclova included a group of large landowners of the region led by José Melchor Sanchez Navarro.

Deceived into believing that Monclova was safely in the hands of rebel supporters, Allende, Hidalgo, other leaders, and 1,000 men of the rebel army departed Saltillo for Monclova. On March 21, 1811, Elizondo was waiting at the Wells of Baján with 150 men. The rebel leaders arrived first at the wells in carriages. Elizondo greeted them with an honor guard. He led the carriages behind a nearby hill not visible from the remainder of the rebel convoy. There, his men demanded the surrender of the rebel leaders. Padre Hidalgo, on horseback, drew a pistol but was restrained from firing by a royalist soldier. Allende was in the fifth carriage, and Allende opened fire. In the return fire Allende's son and several rebel soldiers were killed. The royalists tied the hands of the rebel leaders and their escorts and escorted them to a makeshift prison camp. This process of capturing elements of the rebel army continued all day long. As each new element arrived they were taken captive by Elizondo's men. By the end of the day the royalists had 893 prisoners and had killed about 40 of the rebels who resisted. The rear guard was the only contingent in the rebel army which sensed the danger and escaped capture.

The next day Elizondo divided the prisoners into three groups: the leaders of the rebels including Padre Hidalgo; captured rebel clergymen, and the common soldiers. All prisoners were taken to Monclova first and the lesser offenders remained there for trial. Ten captured clergymen were taken to Durango and 27 military leaders and Hidalgo were taken to Chihuahua for trial. The rebel leaders and many of their followers were executed.

== Royalist soldier ==
After the capture of the rebel leaders, Elizondo was promoted to Lt. Colonel in the royalist army. Given the importance of his capture of the rebel leaders, the reward and the honors he received were modest.

On March 29, 1813, the royalist army in Texas lost the Battle of Rosillo Creek and on April 1 the rebels occupied San Antonio. To begin the effort to recover Texas, General José Joaquín de Arredondo ordered Elizondo to reconnoiter, but not to engage in battle with, the rebel forces of José Bernardo Gutiérrez de Lara in San Antonio. With a force of 1,050 men Elizondo crossed the Rio Grande on June 12 and, against Arredondo's orders, camped near San Antonio de Bexar and demanded Gutiérrez's surrender. On June 20, Gutiérrez's army of 1,500 men surprised Elizondo in the Battle of Alazan Creek and soundly defeated his forces, forcing Elizondo to retreat to the Rio Grande.

General Arredondo ordered Elizondo to join him in an effort to retake the Spanish colony of Texas. With 1,830 men the two commanders advanced from Mexico toward San Antonio. On August 18, 1813, at the Battle of Medina, Elizondo led a cavalry division of the Royal Spanish Army to defeat the 1,400 man rebel Republican Army of the North, crushing the so-called Gutiérrez–Magee Expedition as well as the insurrection in Texas.

Elizondo's last military service to the King of Spain was as the officer in command of a contingent of 500 cavalrymen dispatched by Arredondo from the capital at San Antonio, to chase and mop-up the fleeing survivors of the insurgent army immediately after the Battle of Medina. His last reports (before the incident that led to his death on his return from this successful mission) detail his march along the Camino Real toward eastern Texas, where he captured and executed many of the rebel soldiers at the Spanish hacienda of Trinidad de Salcedo (1807-1813) on Trinity River, which he depopulated and burned (see translation of Elizondo's final reports appended here). He pursued rebel soldiers as far as Nacogdoches in eastern Texas and executed 71 rebel soldiers and took more than 100 prisoners.

Elizondo's last report details reduction of Trinidad de Salcedo.

== Death ==
On September 3, 1813, Elizondo was critically wounded by Lieutenant Miguel (or Manuel) Serrano, while sleeping in his encampment at the edge of the Brazos River. He died a few days later. Many historians believe he was buried on the bank of the San Marcos River, in Texas, New Spain, where he died as he was being carried back to the capital on a litter. However, if Lt. Col. Elizondo was, indeed, first interred on the banks of the San Marcos River, then his remains must have been exhumed later and re-buried in San Antonio, where on 9 October 1815, his burial was recorded in the campo santo record book at San Fernando cathedral as No. 715: "Ignacio Elizondo, Lt. Col. of the cavalry. Spanish, married to Romana Carrasco. He died of wounds received from an attack whilst he slept."
