= Bernardo Gutiérrez de Lara =

Governor of Tamaulipas, Mexico (1774–1841)

José Bernardo Maximiliano Gutiérrez de Lara (August 20, 1774 – May 13, 1841) was an advocate and organizer of Mexican independence and the first constitutional governor of the state of Tamaulipas, and a native of Revilla, today Ciudad Guerrero, Mexico.

== Early life ==
Gutiérrez was obsessed with the idea of freeing Mexico from Spain, and he began by recruiting and arming twenty-one men in Spanish Texas. Together with José Menchaca, he spoke with the Indians and convinced them to fight with him against the Spanish.

== Freedom fighter and rebel leader ==
After the suppression of an 1811 insurrection in Nuevo Santander, Gutiérrez, a strong supporter of the revolutionary movement, traveled to Washington, D.C. He can be viewed as the first Mexican diplomat in Washington, D.C., since on December 10, 1812, he went to the United States House of Representatives to request support for the cause of Mexican independence. He was welcomed with much interest, but the U.S. government could not offer assistance without jeopardizing relations with Spain.

=== The Gutiérrez–Magee Expedition and aftermath ===
Nevertheless, he managed to raise a private force. In The Herald, a newspaper out of Alexandria, Louisiana, he published notice on August 31, 1812, of what he called the “Republicans of Nacogdoches" to recruit volunteers. The troops under Gutiérrez de Lara's command consisted of only 450 men, many of whom were military adventurers from the United States. The force, known as the Gutiérrez–Magee Expedition and commanded by men such as Augustus Magee and Samuel Kemper, invaded Texas in 1812, taking possession of several cities and driving back the forces of Manuel María de Salcedo and Simón de Herrera. In addition, he allowed these two governors and other officials to be executed by Antonio Delgado. On April 6, 1813, he declared the independence of Texas from the kingdom of Spain, proclaimed its first constitution, and declared himself the first president of Texas.

Warned of these developments, José Joaquín de Arredondo, whose forces were quartered in the Valley del Maíz, marched to engage Gutiérrez, collecting men and material on the way through Nuevo Santander. Colonel Ignacio Elizondo, sent in advance, allowed himself to be drawn into an engagement, and was totally routed. A few weeks later, on 13 August 1813, Arredondo himself defeated the insurgents, now under the command of José Álvarez de Toledo y Dubois, who had replaced Gutiérrez, at the Battle of Medina. Many prisoners were executed, including all of the captured United States citizens, in what was the bloodiest battle on Texas soil, ending all hope of aid from the United States.

After the failure to create an independent Texas, Gutiérrez supported the Spanish general Francisco Xavier Mina in his expedition of 1817 in support of the Spanish Constitution of 1812, and later accompanied Mina in his expeditions in 1818 and 1819.

== Politician ==
Agustín de Iturbide, forming a broad coalition under the Plan of Iguala, recognized Bernardo Gutiérrez for his activities in support of Mexican independence. In 1824 he returned to Revilla, and one year later he was made the first constitutional governor of Tamaulipas.

== Later life and death ==
He moved to live in Linares, Nuevo León with his son José Ángel. He fell ill on a trip to Santiago and died May 13, 1841. He was buried in the church at Santiago.

== Legacy ==
An accredited Mexican Medical School, the José Bernardo Gutiérrez de Lara School of Medicine, was founded in his name in 2007.

== See also ==
- Las Casas revolt

== Sources ==
- Gutiérrez de Lara: The Mexican Experience in Texas Rie Jarratt, (New York: Arno Press, 1976).
- Green Flag Over Texas: A Story of the Last Years of Spain in Texas Julia Kathryn Garrett, (Austin: Pemberton Press, 1939).
- Coahuila y Texas en la época colonial Vito Alessio Robles, (Mexico City: Editorial Cultura, 1938; 2d ed).
