= Nemesio de Salcedo =

Spanish colonial official

Nemesio de Salcedo (fl. 1804 - 1813) was a Spanish colonial official who served as the Commandant-General of the Provincias Internas, which at the time included much of northern Mexico and the Southwestern United States.

== Early life and family ==
Born into a noble family with a great military tradition, Nemesio was son of Manuel Salcedo Varela and Agustina Serralta Salcedo. Due to his family's nobility and long tradition of loyal service to the Kings of Spain, a special royal dispensation was granted enabling him, whilst still a minor, to enter as a cadet in the Regiment of Royal Spanish Guards, by May 1, 1761. Salcedo was a native of Bilbao in Spain. He was the brother of Juan Manuel de Salcedo, the last governor of Spanish Louisiana, and the uncle of Manuel María de Salcedo, governor of Spanish Texas.

== Early military service ==
In 1766, he was promoted to captain and transferred to the Regiment of Navarre. He remained with this rank for thirteen years until in 1780 he was again promoted, to sergeant-major, and soon after he was transferred to America during the new war against England begun the previous year.

In 1783 he was awarded the rank of graduate lieutenant-colonel, serving with success in the expedition of Algiers, as well as in the capture of Mobila (present Mobile, Alabama). As a half-battalion commander of his regiment, he took part in the siege and capture of Pensacola, Florida. His military successes and noble position earned him a new promotion in 1790 to colonel in the Infantry Regiment of the Crown of New Spain. In 1794 he was commissioned as mayor of San Luis de Potosí and Zacatecas, where he created two provincial cavalry regiments. As a reward he was promoted again in 1795 to Brigadier and placed in charge of the Free Company of Volunteers of Catalonia and of the General Body of Invalids of New Spain.

== Commandant of the Provincias Internas ==
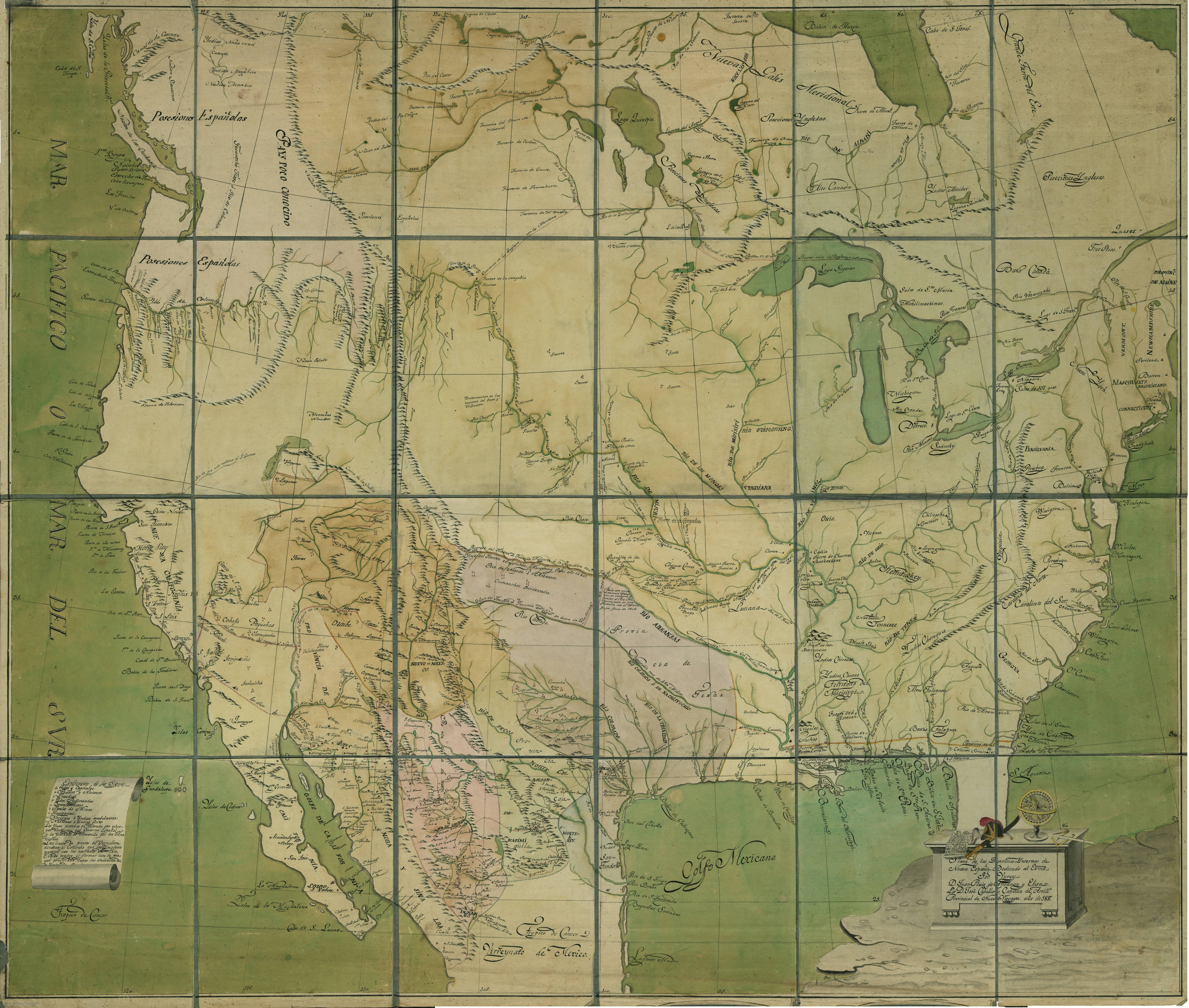
1817 Spanish map of the Provincias Internas

Nemesio Salcedo's excellent achievements in the administrative and military policy of the viceroyalty, the strength of his command and directives, as well as the unanimous support of all his superiors, including the viceroys themselves, earned him the royal appointment as Commandant General of the Internal Provinces (dated 26 August 1800), succeeding Pedro Grimarest. One of Salcedo's major concerns was to bring order to the defensive measures that had to be taken in Texas, whose problem with the Indians, especially the Comanche, was becoming endemic. Previous military officials of Texas had welcomed American immigrants from anywhere, pleased to increase the sparse and widely-dispersed population of the province. However, the traditional Spanish policy of excluding foreigners and foreign trade was reinstated in Texas under Salcedo's command. In the 1780s and 1790s, when Spanish officials had invited Americans to Louisiana and Florida, private US citizens who ventured into Texas, and deeper into the Internal Provinces, were in danger of apprehension, long imprisonment and even death. Unlike some of his subordinates, Salcedo saw no reason to allow them to trade or settle elsewhere in the Internal Provinces. The foreigners, according to him "are not and will not be anything else than crows that take our eyes out". Unlike his predecessors in Louisiana, Salcedo would not maintain an open-door policy toward foreigners. Nevertheless in spite of Salcedo's unwelcoming policies, many American interlopers were not discouraged. In 1801, even the death of the infamous American contrabandista Philip Nolan, a veteran trafficker of horses stolen from Spanish Texas, and the apprehension of his men at the hands of Spanish troops, did not discourage the influx of Americans.

The position of Commandant General included military responsibilities as well as direction of finance and postal functions in the territory. With little oversight due to the remoteness of the region, he was able to use his position to amass a significant private fortune. His administration occupied a tumultuous period of the region's history, including the Louisiana Purchase, which brought the borders of the United States to the edge of Texas, and the War of Mexican Independence.

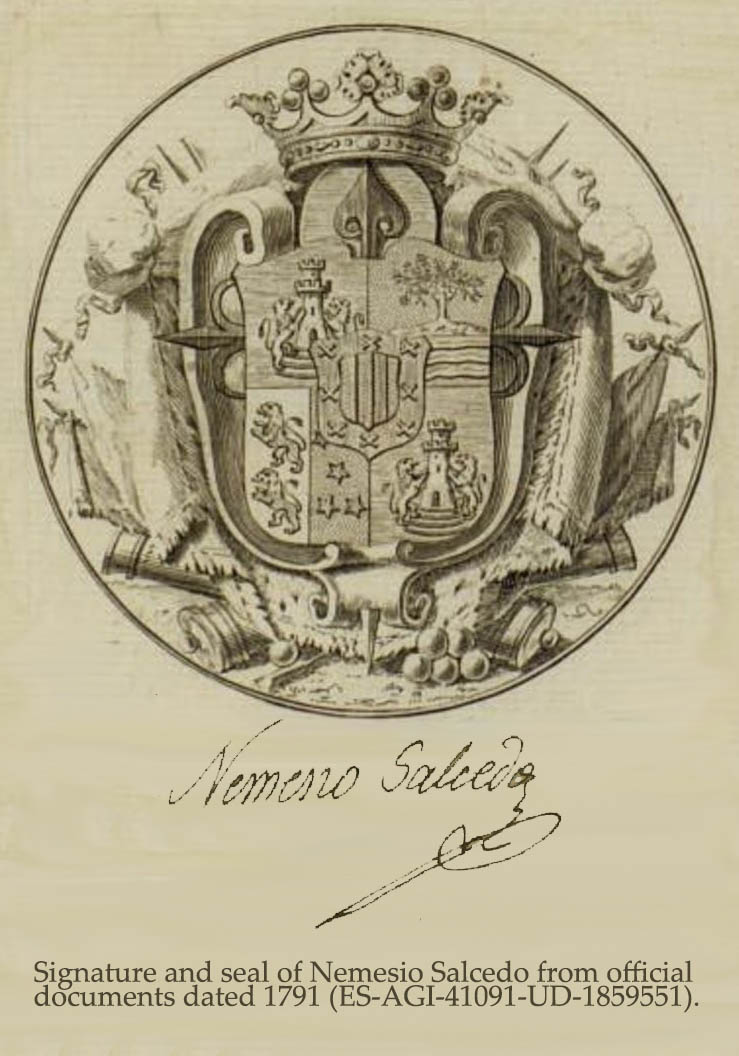
Signature and seal of Nemesio Salcedo, 1791.

== Border disputes ==
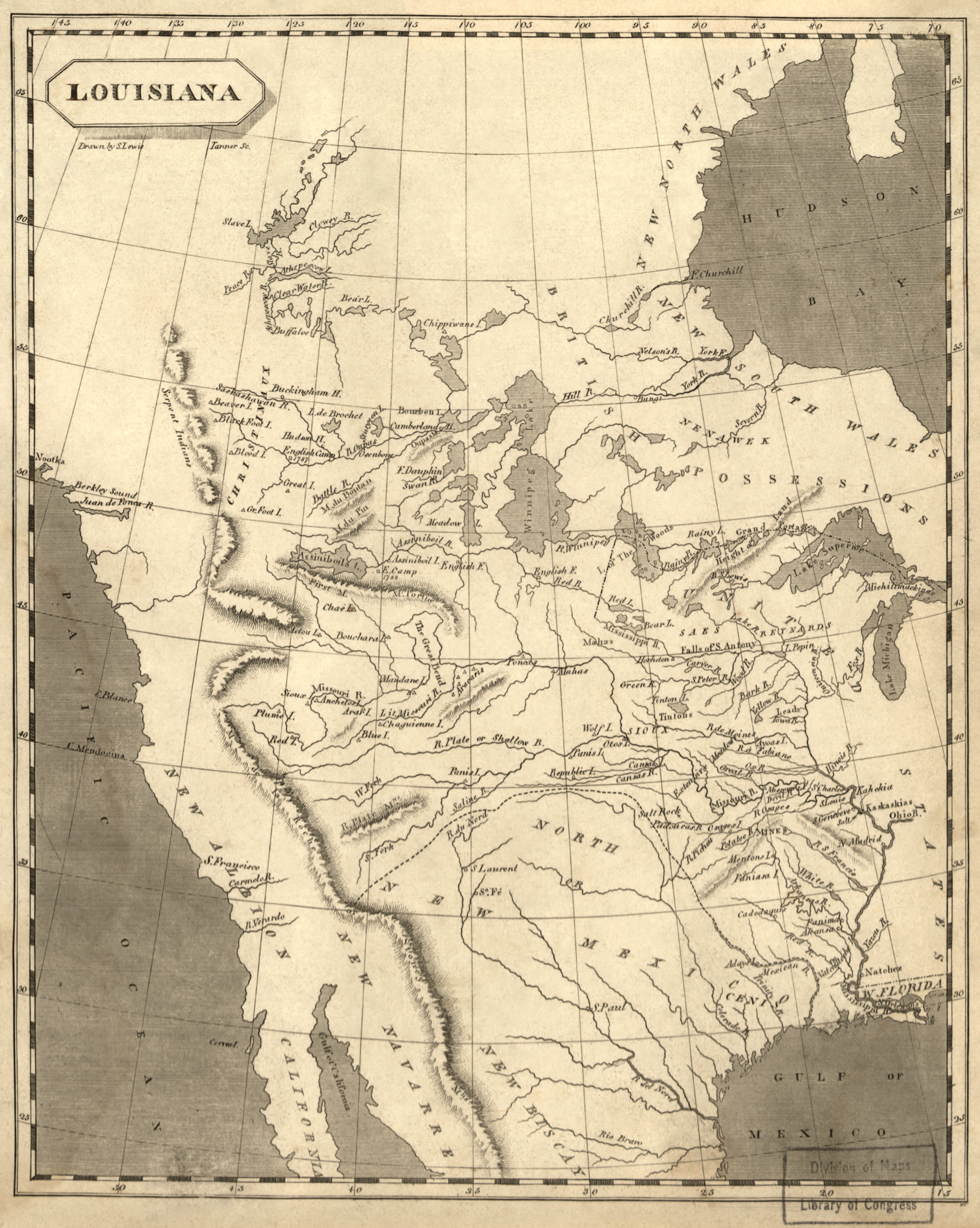
1804 map of Louisiana; the lack of well-defined borders of the Louisiana territory led to border disputes

The language in the Third Treaty of San Ildefonso, which had ceded Spanish Louisiana back to France, was vague on the exact location of the border between French and Spanish territory, and this vagueness led to tensions between Spain and the United States. Thomas Jefferson asserted that the newly-purchased American territory extended well into Spanish-claimed lands, to the Rio Grande and Rocky Mountains, and American expeditions set out to survey and explore the border areas. Salcedo was alarmed at American incursions into Spanish territory; he went so far as to send a party to the Pawnees bearing lavish gifts, with the request that they capture American interlopers and bring them to Santa Fe. One group of explorers, in 1806, was turned back while navigating the Red River by Spanish troops. Salcedo had ordered troops sent to the Texas-Louisiana border in advance of a possible confrontation, and by the time of the 1806 incident there were more than 1300 Spanish troops stationed in Texas, with most of those at Nacogdoches. Fortunately for both sides, both sides proceeded with caution. Salcedo ordered his subordinates not to initiate hostilities, while the king of Spain sent orders to make every effort to solve disputes peacefully. A neutral ground agreement was negotiated that prevented open hostilities between the two sides. In the meantime, Salcedo closed the Texas border to immigration from Louisiana; even Spanish immigrants were barred from entering via this route, being required instead to enter via Veracruz, and only with the permission of the viceroy.

== War of Independence ==
The next major event in Salcedo's administration was the Mexican War of Independence. When war broke out in the south of Mexico, Salcedo made every effort to prevent it from spreading into his territory in the north. While his military achievements were not notable, he did superintend the trial and execution of the insurgent leader Miguel Hidalgo in 1811. Despite his efforts, the revolution spread into the Provincias Internas; among the casualties of the fighting was his nephew Manuel, who was one of the royalist leaders executed after the Battle of Rosillo Creek in 1813.

== Return to Spain ==
Though some sources report Nemesio Salcedo among the casualties at the Battle of Rosillo Creek (in addition to his nephew), this is in error. He was recalled to Spain in 1813, after which the Provincias Internas were divided into eastern and western parts. He was succeeded in the east by José Joaquín de Arredondo.
