= Simón de Herrera =

Spanish colonial administrator (1754–1813)

44th Governor of Nuevo León
- In office April 7, 1795 – 1805
- Preceded by: Manuel Bahamonde y Villamil
- Succeeded by: Pedro de Herrera y Leyva

34th Governor of the Spanish Colony of Texas
- In office July, 1811 – December, 1811
- Preceded by: Juan Bautista de las Casas
- Succeeded by: Cristóbal Domínguez

Personal details
- Born: 1754 Santa Cruz de Tenerife, Canary Islands, Spain
- Died: April 3, 1813 (aged 58-59) Bexar County, Spanish Texas, New Spain, Spanish Empire

Simón de Herrera y Leyva (1754–1813) was a lifelong political and military professional for Spain, primarily in the lands known as New Spain and at times ventured to Europe. He became an interim governor of Spanish Texas at San Antonio and a governor of Nuevo León.

== Early life and career ==
Born in the Canary Islands in 1754, Simón de Herrera started his military career at the early age of nine, joining the Guimar Militia as sub-lieutenant on September 12, 1763. On August 2, 1769, at the age of 15, he had already reached the rank of captain of militia. In 1776, he served in South American ventures capturing Portuguese (now Brazilian) towns and ports. In Spain, he served as special courier to France and participated in the Great Siege of Gibraltar until 1781.

In 1782, he fought under the command of Bernardo de Gálvez at Guárico, Venezuela, and became acquainted with George Washington. He performed military services from 1788 to 1794 in Colotlán and Guadalajara, in Nueva Galicia, and afterwards took on a military leadership role in Nuevo León.

== Governorships ==
On April 7, 1795, he assumed political and military governorship of Nuevo León. He successfully lead his command against large raiding parties of Apaches and Comanches in 1797. In addition, he provided protection for the Texas frontier.

=== Move to Texas ===
Commissioned as commandant of the Louisiana frontier, he traveled to San Antonio on May 31, 1806. He was ordered by Commandant General of the Internal Provinces, Nemesio Salcedo y Salcedo, to patrol the area between the Sabine and the Arroyo Hondo. He occupied Bayou Pierre in resistance to foreseen American aggression by General James Wilkinson. In November 1806, Herrera and Wilkinson settled on the Neutral Ground agreement (which was honored until the Adams–Onís Treaty of 1819). After 1806 Herrera devoted his time in improving the defenses of Texas.

During the rebellion led by Miguel Hidalgo y Costilla, Herrera was imprisoned in 1811, during the Casas Revolt in San Antonio. Herrera and Governor Manuel María de Salcedo were removed for detention to Ignacio Elizondo's hacienda in Coahuila. These two royalist prisoners persuaded Elizondo to change allegiance. Their new convert Elizondo soon captured Hidalgo and his followers on their pilgrimage to establish San Antonio as the center of the revolt in New Spain. In July 1811, Herrera returned to San Antonio as ad interim governor. He filled this position for six months, until Salcedo resumed the office in December. Salcedo and Herrera were confronted by the Gutiérrez–Magee Expedition, a filibuster that captured Nacogdoches and La Bahía in November 1812. Herrera and Salcedo began a three-month siege of La Bahía. But after failing to get the rebels to surrender, they fell back to San Antonio in February.

== Capture and execution ==
Pursued by the Gutiérrez–Magee Expedition, they suffered a disastrous defeat at the Battle of Rosillo Creek. On March 29, in less than an hour, an army of over a thousand were defeated by an army half their strength. They surrendered San Antonio to the republican army on April 1, 1813. and the royalist leaders were taken prisoner. Two days later radical Mexican revolutionaries murdered Governors Herrera and Salcedo, and several other leaders as they were marched out of town. Their bodies were left on the ground, but later they were retrieved by Father José Dario Zambrano and buried at the San Fernando Cathedral on August 28.
