= William Shaler =

American diplomat (1773–1833)

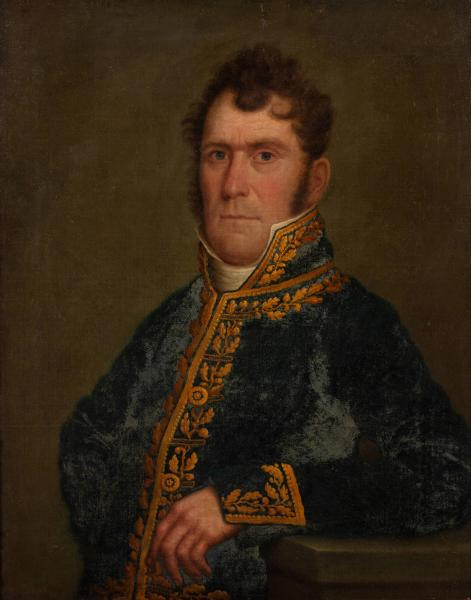
William Shaler

William Shaler (1773 – March 29, 1833) was an American writer, ethnographer, diplomat and confidential agent, assigned to Algiers, Mexico and Cuba.

== Life and career ==
William Shaler was born in Bridgeport, Connecticut, in 1773. His mother, Sibbel Warner Shaler, died when he was eight years old, and his father Timothy, a veteran of the American Revolutionary War, died when William was 12. The trustee of Timothy Shaler's estate either embezzled or mismanaged it, leaving William, two brothers and a sister to fend for themselves. The Shaler Family was of English descent, with origins from Warwickshire, England.

Shaler was apprenticed to Phoenix, Ingraham & Nixen, a New York City mercantile firm, where he learned bookkeeping and other business skills. He then became a commercial agent for the firm, sailing to France and back to oversee the acquisition and shipment of goods for sale in the United States. Shaler learned to speak French, and commenced a period of dedicated self-study designed to make up for his lack of formal education.

Shaler subsequently worked as a sea captain, commanding trading vessels that sailed around the world. In 1803 he was Captain of the Leila Bird when his crew and he were forced to fight their way out of San Diego Bay during an extended Pacific voyage because of a dispute with the local Spanish governor. This was one of the first visits to California by an American. Shaler's subsequent written description was widely circulated and led to increased American travel to and trade with California.

In 1810 Shaler, a friend of Secretary of State Robert Smith, was appointed by United States President James Madison as a confidential agent. He was supposed to go to Mexico and observe activities in Veracruz during an effort by Mexicans to overthrow the Spanish government. Attempting to reach Mexico by way of Cuba, Shaler was accused of collaborating with opponents of the Spanish government in Havana and was detained. In 1811 he made his way to the Territory of Orleans, where he made contact with Bernardo Gutiérrez de Lara. Shaler advised Guttierez while he recruited an army to fight the Spanish in Mexico. Shaler traveled into Texas with Guttierez during the 1812-13 Gutiérrez–Magee Expedition and was with him when he proclaimed Texas independent.

During negotiations to end the War of 1812, which culminated in the Treaty of Ghent, Shaler was appointed Secretary to the U.S. peace delegation. His efforts were considered to be ineffective, largely because he formed friendships with Jonathan Russell and Henry Clay, which made John Quincy Adams distrustful.

From 1815 to 1828 Shaler served as U.S. Consul in Algiers. Early in his assignment he took part with William Bainbridge and Stephen Decatur in a peace mission to end the Second Barbary War.

In 1825 Shaler was elected a member of the American Philosophical Society. In 1828 he received an honorary master's degree from the College of New Jersey.

Shaler was appointed U.S. Consul in Havana in 1829, where he served until dying in a cholera epidemic on March 29, 1833. According to published accounts, this epidemic resulted in more than 14,000 deaths. According to Shaler's friend and Vice-Consul, Richard J. Cleveland, so many people were dying so quickly that Cuban authorities abandoned the usual procedures for funerals and interments, opting for mass burials. Cleveland was able to intercede, claiming Shaler's remains and having them interred with an appropriate gravestone in the English Cemetery (also called Foreigners Cemetery or Protestant Cemetery) at La Chorrera, which was then a few miles east of Havana, but is now a neighborhood of the city. William Shaler was never married and had no children.

== Published works ==
- Journal of a Voyage Between China and the North-Western Coast of America, Made in 1804, 1808
- Communication on the Language, Manners, and Customs of the Berbers, 1824
- Sketches of Algiers, 1826

Diplomatic posts
Preceded by New position	United States Agent in Mexico; 1810–1812	Succeeded by John H. Robinson
Preceded by New position	United States Consul in Algiers; 1815–1828	Succeeded by William P. Hodgson
Preceded by Thomas M. Rodney	United States Consul in Havana; 1830–1833	Succeeded by Nicholas Trist
