= Augustus Magee =

American adventurer and filibuster

Augustus William Magee (also McGee); (1789 – February 6, 1813) was a U.S. Army lieutenant and later a military filibuster who led the Gutiérrez–Magee Expedition into Spanish Texas in 1812.

== Early life and military career ==
Augustus Magee was born in Boston, Massachusetts, the son of James Magee and Margaret (Elliot) Magee. His father, a native of County Down, Ireland, settled in New York before moving to Boston and was a privateer captain in the American Revolution and, following independence, a leading merchant in the China trade.

Young Magee attended Phillips Exeter Academy in Exeter, New Hampshire. He then attended West Point and graduated in 1809. He served as an artillery officer under then-lieutenant colonel Zebulon Pike at Baton Rouge, Louisiana, and then at Fort Claiborne in Natchitoches, Louisiana. He was effective but harsh in his treatment of settlers and outlaws, in the disputed Neutral Ground between the Arroyo Hondo and the Sabine River. Magee was recommended for promotion to a higher rank, but his promotion was denied, likely due to his connection with his uncle, Thomas H. Perkins, a political opponent of the Madison Administration.

Magee resigned his commission on June 22, 1812, and joined Bernardo Gutiérrez de Lara's effort to support the Mexican War of Independence by invading Spanish Texas from American soil, even though this action violated the Neutrality Act of 1794. The Gutiérrez-Magee Expedition, which followed, was recruited from mostly American frontiersmen and French creoles of Louisiana. Some participants had been among the Neutral Ground "bandits" whom Magee had punished in 1810 and early in 1812. Magee took the rank of colonel alongside Gutiérrez.

== Filibuster ==
Leaving Natchitoches with 130 men on August 2, 1812, the group crossed the Sabine six days later, officially restarting the revolution in Texas which had begun with a revolt in San Antonio a year before under Juan Bautista de las Casas. On August 11th, the force entered Nacogdoches, Texas. The army, now swollen to about 300 soldiers, occupied Santísima Trinidad de Salcedo (now Trinidad, Texas) on the Trinity River in mid-September. It was here that Magee became ill, likely from consumption. The papers of Mirabeau Lamar preserve a rumor that Magee was poisoned by his own men, many of whom were among those he had previously mistreated during his former command, but the length of his illness makes this unlikely.

The army next moved on San Antonio, but after Magee learned of a planned Spanish ambush along the Guadalupe River, he moved his force southeastward and seized the Presidio Nuestra Señora de Loreto de la Bahía in what is now Goliad, Texas. Here, his force was besieged by the Spanish army. Magee, believing the rebel cause was untenable, sought to parlay with the Spaniards. The terms they provided - that the Americans retreat, but leave native Mexican rebels to the Spaniards' punishment - were disavowed by his troops. Magee then retreated to his quarters and, because of his worsening illness, never again commanded the army; he died on February 6, 1812. Magee was succeeded in command of the expedition by Samuel Kemper, who successfully ended the siege by the Royalists the following month.

== See also ==
- Casas Revolt

== Sources ==
- Bernsen, James Aalan “Magee, Augustus William,” Handbook of Texas Online, accessed May 23, 2024, https://www.tshaonline.org/handbook/entries/magee-augustus-william.
- Bernsen, James Aalan “The Lost War for Texas: Mexican Rebels, American Burrites, and the Texas Revolution of 1811, Texas A&M University Press, College Station, Texas, 2024.
- Davis, William C. The Pirates Laffite and The Treacherous World of the Corsairs of the Gulf. New York: Harcourt, 2005. p. 141.
- Lamar, Mirabeau. "Information from Capt. Gaines." 1835. Retrieved 13 February 2010.
- Warren, Harris Gaylord: Gutierrez-Magee Expedition from the Handbook of Texas Online. Retrieved 13 February 2010.
