= Reuben Kemper =

American pioneer and filibuster

Reuben Kemper (February 21, 1771 – January 29, 1827) was an American pioneer and filibuster.

== Kemper and West Florida ==
Born in Fauquier County, Virginia, Kemper and his brothers Nathan and Samuel settled in Feliciana Parish, near Baton Rouge, Spanish West Florida, shortly after 1800. Expelled from the province by the Spanish authorities in a dispute over land titles, the Kemper brothers organized a small force in Mississippi Territory and returned, declaring West Florida to be independent. They attempted to capture Baton Rouge in 1804, but were defeated, having failed to gain the support of local Anglo-American settlers. Most of the latter were satisfied with Spanish rule on account of Spain's liberal land grants and its protection of slavery. The following year Spanish forces captured all three brothers while they were on U.S. soil, but American forces rescued them as they were being taken down the Mississippi River.

Flag carried by the Kemper's men in 1804, per description

In 1810, during the rebellion against Spanish rule by British and Anglo-American settlers (who comprised the majority of inhabitants), Reuben Kemper and Joseph White were authorized to invite the inhabitants of Mobile and Pensacola to join in the revolt. When Kemper crossed into the Mississippi Territory, U.S. forces arrested him, as they did not wish to provoke Spain into war and feared Kemper's intentions. He was more fortunate than his colleagues, who were seized by the Spanish authorities and sent as prisoners to El Morro, in Havana, Cuba.

But the rebellion spread and the Republic of West Florida declared independence from Spain. 78 days later, it was annexed by the United States.

== Later years ==
In 1812–13, Kemper took part in the Gutiérrez–Magee Expedition into Spanish Texas, fighting to help free Mexico from Spanish rule. He also served as a colonel under Andrew Jackson at the Battle of New Orleans in January 1815.

Kemper settled down as a planter in Mississippi. He died in 1827 in Natchez, Mississippi, aged 55 or 56.

== Legacy ==
Reuben Kemper is the namesake of Kemper County, Mississippi.

== See also ==
- Samuel Kemper, his brother.

== Notes and references ==
- David A. Bice, The Original Lone Star Republic: Scoundrels, Statesmen and Schemers of the 1810 West Florida Rebellion, Heritage Publishing Consultants, 2004.
- McMichael, Andrew (2002). "The Kemper 'Rebellion': Filibustering and Resident Anglo American Loyalty in Spanish West Florida". Louisiana History: The Journal of the Louisiana Historical Association. 43 (2 Spring): 133–165 – via JSTOR.
- Andrew McMichael, Atlantic Loyalties: Americans in Spanish West Florida, 1785-1810, University of Georgia Press, 2008.
