= Leming, Texas =

Census-designated place in Atascosa County, Texas, United States

- Census-designated place
- Interactive map of Leming, Texas
- Coordinates: 29°04′36″N 98°28′25″W
- Country: United States
- State: Texas
- County: Atascosa

Area
  - Total: 4.8 sq mi (12 km^{2})
  - Land: 4.8 sq mi (12 km^{2})
  - Water: 0.0 sq mi (0 km^{2})
- Elevation: 472 ft (144 m)

Population (2010)
  - Total: 946
  - Density: 200/sq mi (76/km^{2})
- Time zone: UTC-6 (Central (CST))
  - Summer (DST): UTC-5 (CDT)
- Zip Code: 78050, 78064
- FIPS code: 48-42256
- GNIS feature ID: 2586951

Leming is a census-designated place (CDP) in Atascosa County, Texas, United States. As of the 2020 census, Leming had a population of 841. This was a new CDP for the 2010 census. The community is part of the San Antonio Metropolitan Statistical Area. Leming has a post office, with the ZIP code 78050.

== Geography ==
According to the United States Census Bureau, the CDP has a total area of 4.8 square miles (12 km^{2}), all land.

== Demographics ==
Historical population
Census	Pop.	Note	%±
2010	946		—
2020	841		−11.1%
U.S. Decennial Census; 1850–1900 1910; 1920 1930 1940; 1950 1960 1970; 1980 1990 2000; 2010 2020

Leming was first appeared as a census designated place in the 2010 U.S. census.

=== 2020 census ===
Leming CDP, Texas – Racial and ethnic composition Note: the US Census treats Hispanic/Latino as an ethnic category. This table excludes Latinos from the racial categories and assigns them to a separate category. Hispanics/Latinos may be of any race.
Race / Ethnicity (NH = Non-Hispanic)	Pop 2010	Pop 2020	% 2010	% 2020
White alone (NH)	184	190	19.45%	22.59%
Black or African American alone (NH)	0	0	0.00%	0.00%
Native American or Alaska Native alone (NH)	0	1	0.00%	0.12%
Asian alone (NH)	0	0	0.00%	0.00%
Native Hawaiian or Pacific Islander alone (NH)	0	0	0.00%	0.00%
Other race alone (NH)	0	2	0.00%	0.24%
Mixed race or Multiracial (NH)	1	6	0.11%	0.71%
Hispanic or Latino (any race)	761	642	80.44%	76.34%
Total	946	841	100.00%	100.00%

== See also ==
- List of census-designated places in Texas
