= José Álvarez de Toledo y Dubois =

Politician and military leader against Spanish rule in Texas

José Álvarez de Toledo y Dubois (14 May 1779 in Havana – 16 April 1858 in Paris) was a politician and leader of a military force against Spanish rule in Texas.

Álvarez de Toledo was born in Havana, the son of Luis Álvarez de Toledo y Liche, a navy captain of Seville, Spain, and María Dolores Dubois. He was educated at the Escuela Naval de Cádiz and then joined the Spanish Navy in 1806. In 1808 he switched to serving in the British Navy (for a few years).

Toledo was elected a representative of Santo Domingo to the Cortes of Cádiz. However he favored independence for Spain's American possessions and was exiled in 1811. He next went to the United States where Secretary of State James Monroe gave him funds to try and form a revolution in Cuba.

Toledo then was one of the supporters of José Bernardo Maximiliano Gutierrez de Lara in his efforts for Mexico to secede from Spain. Gutierrez's ancestors were among the first European Spanish settlers and colonizers in Mexico, Texas and surrounding areas. Gutierrez de Lara established himself as the first President of Texas. Toledo sought efforts to become the second President of Texas.

Toledo took control of San Antonio on August 1, 1813. He was defeated by the Spanish Army at the Battle of Medina on August 18, 1813.

Toledo fled Texas. In 1814 he led an unsuccessful attempt to invade Texas from Louisiana. They made it past the Sabine River but did not make any significant progress.

In 1816 Toledo sought to reconcile himself with the Spanish authorities. He opposed the work of Xavier Mina that year. He then returned to Spain where he was an adviser to King Ferdinand VII.
