= Battle of Rosillo Creek =

Part of the Mexican War of Independence

Coordinates: 29.3422°N 98.4024°W

- Part of the Gutiérrez–Magee Expedition
Date	29 March 1813
Location	Salado Creek, Texas
Result	RAN victory

Belligerents
Royalist	Republican Army of the North

Commanders and leaders
Simón de Herrera	Samuel Kemper

Strength
1,500	500 – 600

Casualties and losses
330 dead 6 cannons 1,500 horse	6 dead

The Battle of Rosillo Creek (also known as the Battle of Rosalis) was a conflict between the Republican Army of the North and Spanish Royalist forces which occurred on March 29, 1813 in Coahuila y Tejas. The battle took place during the Gutiérrez–Magee Expedition, a filibustering campaign which took place during the Mexican War of Independence.

== The combatants ==
The battle involved the Republican Army of the North (RAN), which was led by filibusters Samuel Kemper (who had been involved in an 1804 rebellion in Florida), Augustus Magee, and Bernardo Gutiérrez de Lara, the expedition's leader, fighting against the Spanish Royalist forces commanded by Manuel María de Salcedo, Governor of the province of Texas, and Simón de Herrera, the governor of Nuevo León.

The RAN comprised Anglo-Americans, Mexicans and Indigenous Indians. The group also had some help from the United States,

== Background ==
In 1812 the RAN crossed over the Sabine River from Louisiana into Texas. Flying a green flag, they captured the town of Nacogdoches on August 7, 1812. They quickly marched to Goliad, where they captured the Presidio La Bahía. Kemper became a commander of the force upon the death of Colonel Magee there.

From November 13, 1812, to February 19, 1813, Goliad was besieged when the Royalist army finally arrived to confront them. Unable to defeat the Republican Army, however, the Royalists were forced to retreat to San Antonio in March, 1813. Kemper and the RAN, numbering about 900 men, pursued.

== The battle ==
The Royalist force, numbering 1,500 men, planned to ambush the RAN from a ridge which overlooked Rosillo Creek near its confluence with Salado Creek, approximately nine miles southeast of San Antonio de Bexar. Their trap failed when they were detected by the Republican forces, who defeated them in less than an hour. At a cost of six men, the Republican Army killed 100 to 330 Royalists and captured materiel including six cannon and 1,500 horses.

== Aftermath ==
The Royalists retreated to San Antonio where they surrendered to the Republican Army on April 1. Two days later Salcedo, Herrera, and 12 others were executed by the victors. On April 6 the Republican Army issued a draft declaration of independence.

== Location ==
A granite marker was erected in 1936 to commemorate this battle, but a discovery made in 2015 indicates this location may be incorrect. The battle actually probably took place under the part of I-410 that is about 4500 feet due west of the intersection of Hildebrand Road, S WW White Road and Cacias Road.

== See also ==
- History of Texas

== Sources ==
- "The Sons of the Republic of Texas" By Thomas B. Green, (2003)
- "Texas Tales Your Teacher Never Told You" by C. F. Eckhardt, published by Wordware publishing, Inc. (Regional Division)
- "Program for Ceremonies Commemorating the 175th Anniversary of the Battle of Medina August 21, 1988" by Robert H. Thonhoff
- "Green Flag Over Texas" by Julia Kathryn Garrett, Cordova Press, New York
