= Juan Bautista de las Casas =

33ºGovernor of the Spanish Colony of Texas
- In office 1811–1811
- Preceded by: Manuel María de Salcedo
- Succeeded by: Simón de Herrera

Personal details
- Died: August 3, 1811
- Profession: Political

Juan Bautista de las Casas led a revolt against the governor of Spanish Texas in 1811 and served as head of the province for 39 days until he was deposed.

== Revolt ==
The Mexican War of Independence was launched on September 16, 1810, by Father Miguel Hidalgo, who called on people born in New Spain to overthrow the viceregal regime, which was dominated by European-born peninsulares and royalist criollos. One of his goals was to inflame the northernmost provinces, especially Spanish Texas, in the hopes that his cause might win the support of the United States.

On January 21, 1811, Las Casas, a retired militia captain from Nuevo Santander led a group of army sergeants at Presidio San Antonio de Bexar to stage a coup in San Antonio. The following morning they arrested the royalist governor of Spanish Texas, Manuel María de Salcedo, and his entire military staff. Even as Salcedo was led to detention however, the rebellious soldiers instinctively saluted him. Las Casas chained Salcedo, Simón de Herrera, the governor of Nuevo Santander who was living in San Antonio, and twelve other Spanish officers and humilitiated them in front of the town. The prisoners were then transferred to Monclova in Coahuila. Revolutionary leaders in Coahuila named Las Casas interim governor of Texas.

The rest of Texas was quickly revolutionized. There was little resistance in Nacogdoches, where the presidio commander was arrested, or in La Bahia. Las Casas promptly confiscated property belonging to Spanish residents, proclaimed himself the head of a provisional government, released political prisoners and jailed royalists.

== Capture and arrest ==
Las Casas's arbitrary rule disenchanted much of the army, and Juan Manuel Zambrano, the subdeacon of San Antonio, soon led a counterinsurgency against him composed of both disaffected rebels and the remaining royalists. On March 2, Zambrano marched on the government house and captured and arrested Casas and Ignacio Aldama, Hidalgo's ambassador to the United States. Facing defeat, Las Casas surrendered without a fight, just 39 days after taking over. Zambrano reestablished royalist control of the province and sent a messenger to inform those holding Salcedo.

During his captivity, Salcedo had been slowly enticing his captor, Ignacio Elizondo, with promises of a promotion and other rewards if he would renounce his revolutionary tendencies. After receiving Zambrano's message, Elizondo changed sides again. With his help, on March 13, Salcedo and his military officers were able to capture Pedro de Aranda, who held documents detailing the movements of the revolutionary army. One week later, Salcedo and Elizondo led a group which captured Miguel Hidalgo y Costilla and much of Hidalgo's army, as well as 27 rebel leaders, at the Wells of Baján in Coahuila. Salcedo accompanied the captured leaders from Monclova to Chihuahua, the headquarters of the Commandant General. On April 26, 1811, the Commandant General appointed Salcedo to be president of a seven-member tribunal to try the revolutionaries, and the men were quickly sentenced to death by firing squad.

== Imprisonment and death ==
Casas was sent as a prisoner to Monclova for four months. Loyalists in Coahuila quickly judged, convicted, and executed the prisoners captured in San Antonio. Las Casas was shot in the back and beheaded on August 3, 1811. The body was buried at Monclova, but his head was shipped to San Antonio and displayed on a pole in the military plaza. Salcedo was restored as governor. But with Salcedo still in Chihuahua, Zambrano administered the province. Among his accomplishments during this time was to inaugurate the first primary school in San Antonio.
