= Samuel Kemper =

American adventurer and filibuster

Samuel Kemper (died 1814) was an American adventurer and filibuster.

== Filibustering activities ==
Born in Fauquier County, Virginia, Kemper was involved, along with his brothers Reuben and Nathan Kemper, in the 1804 rebellion against Spanish authorities in West Florida.

Kemper participated in the 1812-13 Gutiérrez-Magee Expedition into New Philippines. He became commander of the force upon the death of Colonel Magee during the siege of La Bahia in February 1813. Kemper fought in both the victorious Battle of Rosillo Creek and the disastrous Battle of Medina. He eventually withdrew from the expedition when he lost confidence in the rebellious Mexican leaders.

== Death ==
Kemper fell ill from malaria on his return to the United States and died at St. Francisville, Louisiana, in 1814.
