= Neutral Ground (Louisiana) =

Disputed area between Spanish Texas and the Louisiana Purchase

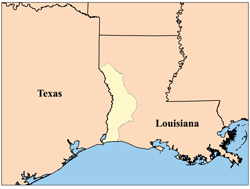
The Neutral Ground

The Neutral Ground (also known as the Neutral Strip, the Neutral Territory, and the No Man's Land of Louisiana; sometimes anachronistically referred to as the Sabine Free State) was a disputed area between Spanish Texas and the United States' newly acquired Louisiana Purchase. Local officers of Spain and the United States agreed to leave the Neutral Ground temporarily outside the jurisdiction of either country. The area, now in western Louisiana, had neutral status from 1806 to 1821.

== Background ==
Spain had been concerned for many years with what it viewed as the encroachment of the French from Louisiana into Texas. About 1734, the French moved their post at Natchitoches from the east to the west side of the Red River. The Spanish governor of Texas, Manuel de Sandoval, was reprimanded for not protesting this violation of what Spain believed was its sovereign territory. In 1740, Governor Prudencio de Orobio y Basterra was ordered to investigate French intrusion in the Natchitoches area. Other investigations were ordered in 1744 and 1751.

In 1753, Texas Governor Jacinto de Barrios y Jáuregui determined that the French had encroached on Texas by occupying territory to the west of Arroyo Hondo, a small creek in western Natchitoches Parish that had previously been used by the French as their western boundary with Texas. In 1764, the boundary dispute became temporarily moot when France ceded its Louisiana colony to Spain. This colony was the large area west of the Mississippi River but drained by the same, plus New Orleans and its immediate vicinity. The transfer was made without resolving the earlier border dispute, which did not seem significant under the circumstances. Spain administered the area from Havana, contracting out governing to people from many nationalities as long as they swore allegiance to Spain and promised to publicly worship in Catholic churches. Many Americans took advantage of these grants that would eventually become known as Rio Hondo claims.

By the secret Third Treaty of San Ildefonso of October 1, 1800, Louisiana was formally transferred back to France, although the Spanish continued to administer it. The terms of the treaty did not specify the boundaries of the territory being returned. Rumors of the treaty reached U.S. President Thomas Jefferson, who sought to purchase land at the mouth of the Mississippi to ensure American access to the Gulf of Mexico. Jefferson discovered that Napoleon was willing to sell the entire territory to help fund his wars in Europe. France took formal control of Louisiana from Spain on November 30, 1803, and turned over New Orleans to the United States on December 20, 1803. The U.S. took over the rest of the territory on March 10, 1804. The Louisiana Purchase doubled the size of the United States and opened U.S. expansion west to the Pacific Ocean and the Gulf Coast.

== United States-Spain boundary dispute ==
The precise boundaries of the area had still not been determined. The United States, having purchased the territory from France, claimed the same boundaries France had claimed before the transfer to Spain. In fact, the U.S. asserted a claim to the Rio Grande as the western border, based on the temporary settlement by René-Robert Cavelier, Sieur de La Salle in Texas in 1684. The more serious U.S. claim, however, was to the Sabine River, today's boundary between the U.S. states of Louisiana and Texas. Spanish claims were the same as before — to the Arroyo Hondo in Natchitoches Parish and, south of the Kisatchie Hills, to the Calcasieu River.

Negotiations to resolve the dispute broke down in 1805 when Spain severed diplomatic relations with the United States. From October 1805 until October 1806, there was continual skirmishing, both verbal and military, around the Sabine River. There were rumors that both sides were amassing troops near the disputed area.

=== Establishment of the Neutral Ground ===
Neither side, however, wanted to go to war over the dispute. In order to avert further armed clashes, U.S. General James Wilkinson and Spanish Lt. Col. Simón de Herrera, the two military commanders in the region, signed an agreement declaring the disputed territory Neutral Ground (November 5, 1806), until the boundary could be determined by the respective governments. The agreement was not a treaty and was not ratified by either government, although it was largely respected. Even with this agreement, the boundaries of the Neutral Ground were not entirely specified.

The Arroyo Hondo and (unconnected) Calcasieu River were the eastern boundary, with the Sabine River serving as the western boundary. The southern boundary was undoubtedly the Gulf of Mexico, and it can be assumed that the northern boundary was the thirty-second parallel, approximately. It included portions of the present-day Louisiana parishes of De Soto, Sabine, Natchitoches, Vernon, Rapides, Beauregard, Allen, Calcasieu, Jefferson Davis, and Cameron.

The area covered by the agreement was declared off-limits to soldiers of both countries. The agreement also stipulated that no settlers would be permitted in the Neutral Ground. Nevertheless, settlers from New Spain and the United States territory began to move in. After the area was recognized as a part of the United States, these settlers were granted third class homestead claims. (Those with Spanish land grants predating the sale of the Louisiana Purchase to the United States were granted first class claims.) Some of the settlers from the United States would form the nucleus of the Louisiana Redbone community. This lawless area also attracted exiles, deserters, political refugees, fortune hunters, and a variety of criminals. Eventually, the highwaymen organized to the degree that they manned outposts and organized spies in order to better fleece travelers and avoid the American and Spanish military. In 1810, and again in 1812, the two governments sent joint military expeditions into the area to expel outlaws.

== Resolution and afterward ==
The Adams–Onís Treaty, signed in 1819 and ratified in 1821, recognized the U.S. claim, setting the border at the Sabine River. Spain surrendered any claim to the area. (Two years after the treaty was negotiated, New Spain won its independence as the Mexican Empire.) After the treaty, however, the Neutral Ground and the adjacent part of East Texas remained in the hands of the Spanish. The Regulator–Moderator War in East Texas in 1839–44 had its roots in the earlier anarchy of the Neutral Ground.

== See also ==
- Fort Jessup
- Fort Selden
- Sabine Free State Festival
- Los Adaes
- History of Lake Charles, Louisiana
- Louisiana Redbones
- Spain – United States relations

== Bibliography ==
- J. V. Haggard, "The Neutral Ground between Louisiana and Texas, 1806–1821," Louisiana Historical Quarterly 28 (October 1945).
