= Presidio La Bahía =

- U.S. National Register of Historic Places
- U.S. National Historic Landmark
- Recorded Texas Historic Landmark
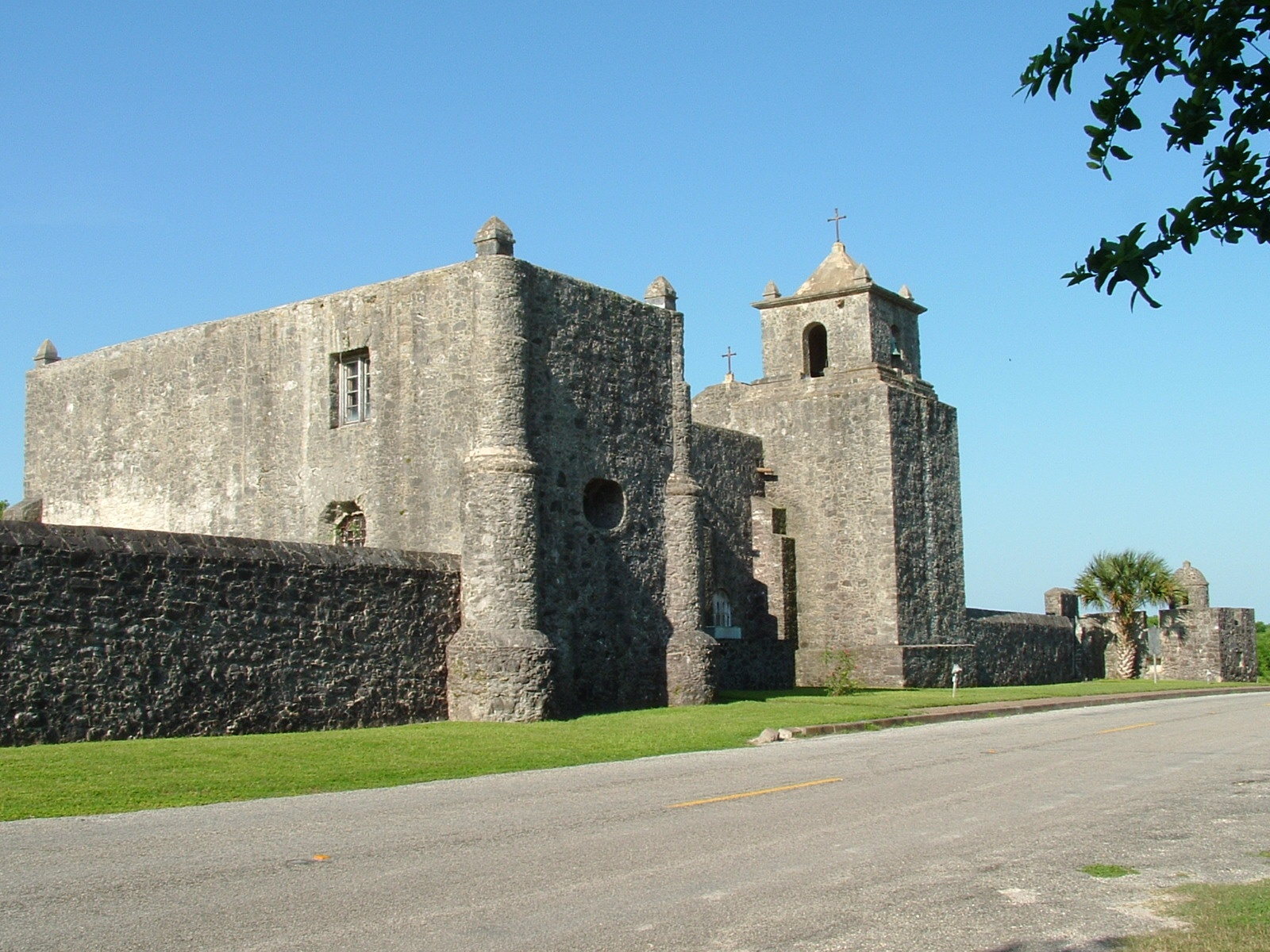
- Presidio La Bahía as it stands today

- Location within Texas
- Nearest city: Goliad, Texas
- Coordinates: 28°38′48″N 97°22′54″W
- Area: 45 acres (18 ha)
- Built: 1749
- NRHP reference No.: 67000024
- RTHL No.: 4119

Significant dates
- Added to NRHP: December 24, 1967
- Designated NHL: December 24, 1967
- Designated RTHL: 1969

The Presidio Nuestra Señora de Loreto de la Bahía, known more commonly as Presidio La Bahía, or simply La Bahía, is a fort constructed by the Spanish Army. It became the center of a community that developed into what is now the city of Goliad, Texas, United States. The current location dates to 1747.

During the Texas Revolution, the presidio was the site of the Battle of Goliad in October 1835, and the Goliad massacre in March 1836.

It was restored in the 1960s and was designated as a National Historic Landmark in 1967. While several adjacent historical sites in Goliad are now part of the Texas state parks system, La Bahía is owned by the Catholic Diocese of Victoria, Texas. It is operated as a public museum. Along with the San Antonio Missions, and the Ysleta and Soccorro Missions in El Paso, It is one of the most important extant Spanish Colonial Missions in Texas.

== Overview ==
Founded in 1721 on the ruins of the failed French Fort Saint Louis, the presidio was moved to a location on the Guadalupe River in 1726. In 1747, the presidio and its mission were moved to their current location on the San Antonio River. By 1771, the presidio had been rebuilt in stone and had become "the only Spanish fortress for the entire Gulf Coast from the mouth of the Rio Grande to the Mississippi River". The civilian settlement, later named Goliad, sprang up around the presidio in the late 18th century; the area was one of the three most important in Spanish Texas.

The presidio was captured by insurgents twice during the Mexican War of Independence, by the Republican Army of the North in 1813 and by the Long Expedition in 1821. Each time the insurgents were later defeated by Spanish troops. By the end of 1821, Texas became part of the newly formed United Mexican States. La Bahía was one of the two major garrisons in Mexican Texas and lay halfway between San Antonio de Béxar (the political center of Spanish Texas) and Copano, the then major port in Texas. In October 1835, days after the beginning of the Texas Revolution, a group of Texian insurgents marched on La Bahía. After a 30-minute battle, the Mexican garrison surrendered and the Texians gained control of the presidio, which they soon renamed Fort Defiance.

During the siege of the Alamo, Texian commander William B. Travis several times asked La Bahía commander James Fannin to bring reinforcements. Although Fannin and his men attempted a relief mission, they abandoned the attempt the following day. After the fall of the Alamo, General Sam Houston ordered Fannin to abandon La Bahía. He did so on March 19, 1836, but took a leisurely path. Following the Battle of Coleto, the La Bahía garrison was captured and imprisoned in the Presidio.

On March 27, 1836, the Texian captives were marched outside the presidio walls and executed, an event known as the Goliad massacre.

Today, the location is a restored historical site, considered among the most attractive Spanish presidio sites in the United States. Directly adjacent, though technically a separate property, is the Fannin Memorial Monument commemorating the massacre.

== Origins ==
Spain claimed control over the area now known as Texas, yet in the late 17th century the area between Mexico and Florida, within the domain of New Spain, increasingly became a lesser priority. Taking advantage of Spain's disinterest, France in 1685 authorized Robert de La Salle to organize a colony in northern New Spain. La Salle intended to put his colony along the Mississippi River, but poor maps and improper navigation decisions led La Salle's expedition to the west shore of Matagorda Bay in Spanish Texas. Believing the French colony was a threat to Spanish mining interests and shipping routes, Spanish King Carlos II's Council of War recommended that "Spain needed swift action 'to remove this thorn which has been thrust into the heart of America. The greater the delay the greater the difficulty of attainment.'" After several years of searching, in early 1689 a Spanish expedition led by Alonso de León located the site of Fort Saint Louis. Several months earlier, Karankawa Indians had destroyed the fort and killed most of the colonists. The returning Spaniards burned the fort and buried the French cannons.

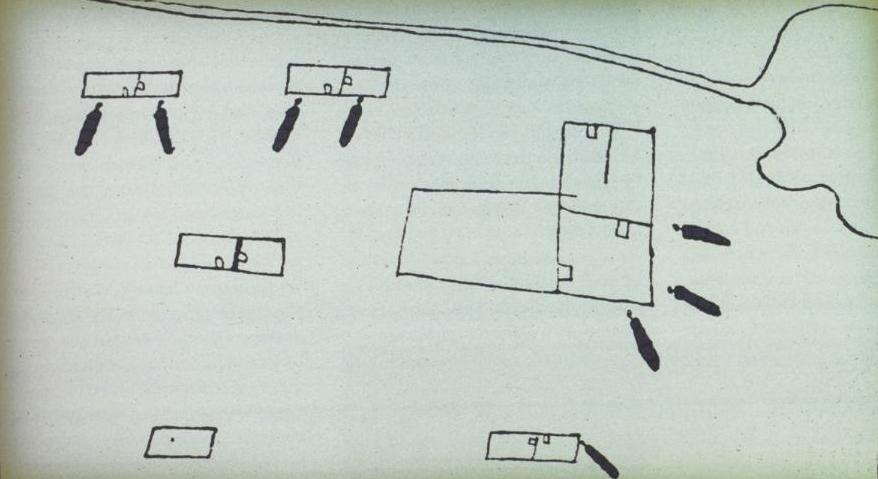
Map of Fort Saint Louis drawn by a member of the Spanish expedition which discovered the French colony in 1689. It marks the river, the colony's structures, and location of cannons.

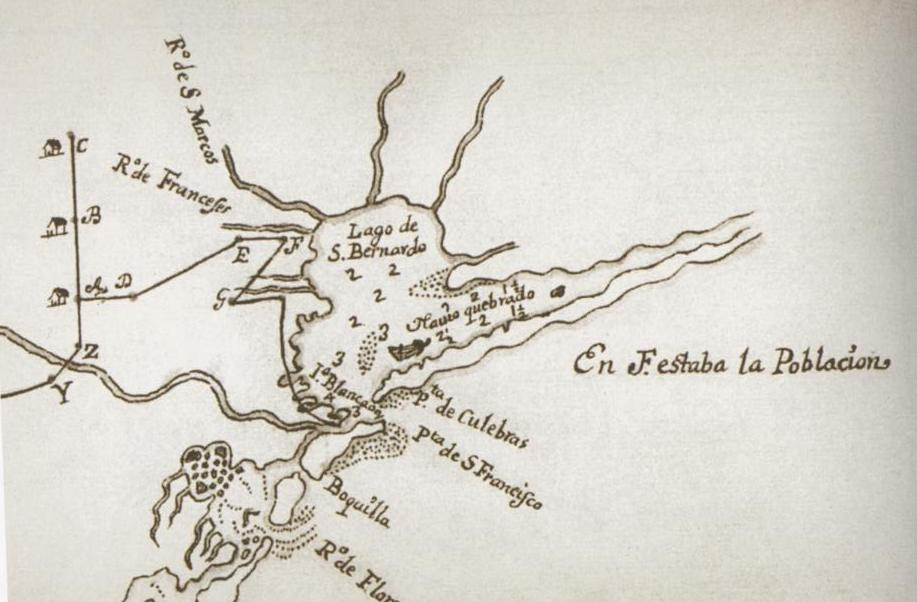
Carlos de Sigüenza y Góngora created this map of Matagorda Bay (known to the Spanish as San Bernardo Bay) based on sketches from Alonso De León's 1689 expedition. Fort Saint Louis is marked as "F", and La Belle is identified as "Navío Quebrado", or "broken ship".

Alonso de León recommended that Spanish authorities establish presidios at the Rio Grande, the Frio River, and the Guadalupe River. Due to a shortage of funds the Spanish government chose not to establish any presidios. Consequently, several Spanish missions in East Texas struggled from 1691 to 1693, until they failed, leaving Texas again unprotected by Spain.

France during the subsequent decades established a presence in Louisiana, causing the Spanish to see their claimed territories threatened with French exploitation and colonization. Spain re-established the East Texas missions in 1716, this time accompanied by a garrisoned presidio. After difficulties with France during the 1719-1720 War of the Quadruple Alliance the Spanish determined to increase their military presence in Texas and in 1721 the Marquis de San Miguel de Aguayo, governor of Texas and Coahuila, founded Presidio La Bahía on the site of La Salle's former fort. When Espíritu Santo de Zúñiga (also known as La Bahía) in 1722 was established nearby for the Coco, Karankawa, and Cujane Indians, a military garrison of 99 men were stationed at the Presidio.

Priests at the nearby mission were unable to find an effective means of enticing the Karankawa into mission life or Catholic teachings. In April 1725 the friars requested that the mission be moved to a more favorable location. The next year both the presidio—retaining the name "Presidio La Bahía"—and Mission Espíritu Santo were relocated 26 miles (42 km) inland, along the Guadalupe River in what is now Victoria County. The presidio and the mission remained at these sites for the next 23 years.

== Establishment on the San Antonio River ==
In 1747, the Spanish government sent José de Escandón to inspect the northern frontier of the North American colonies. Escandón assigned La Bahía's captain, Joaquín Prudencio de Orobio y Basterra, to evaluate South Texas. On reading Orobio's report, Escandón recommended that La Bahía be moved from its Guadalupe River location to the banks of the San Antonio River, so that it would be more capable of assisting settlements along the Rio Grande. Both the presidio and the mission likely moved in October 1749. Escandón proposed that 25 Mexican families be relocated near the presidio to form a civilian settlement but was unable to find enough willing settlers.

In February 1750, the new presidio was under the command of Captain Manuel Ramírez de la Piszena. Piszena had personally paid for a stone house to be built for himself, and the 50 soldiers in the garrison lived either in a large barracks or in one of 40 temporary wood homes that had been built for those with families. A chapel had also been built for the presidio. The presidio was fortified with six 8-lb cannon. Soldiers alternated guard duty at the presidio and the mission; others were assigned to guard the presidio horses or to protect supply trains coming from the Rio Grande or San Antonio de Béxar from attacks by Lipan Apache raiding parties.

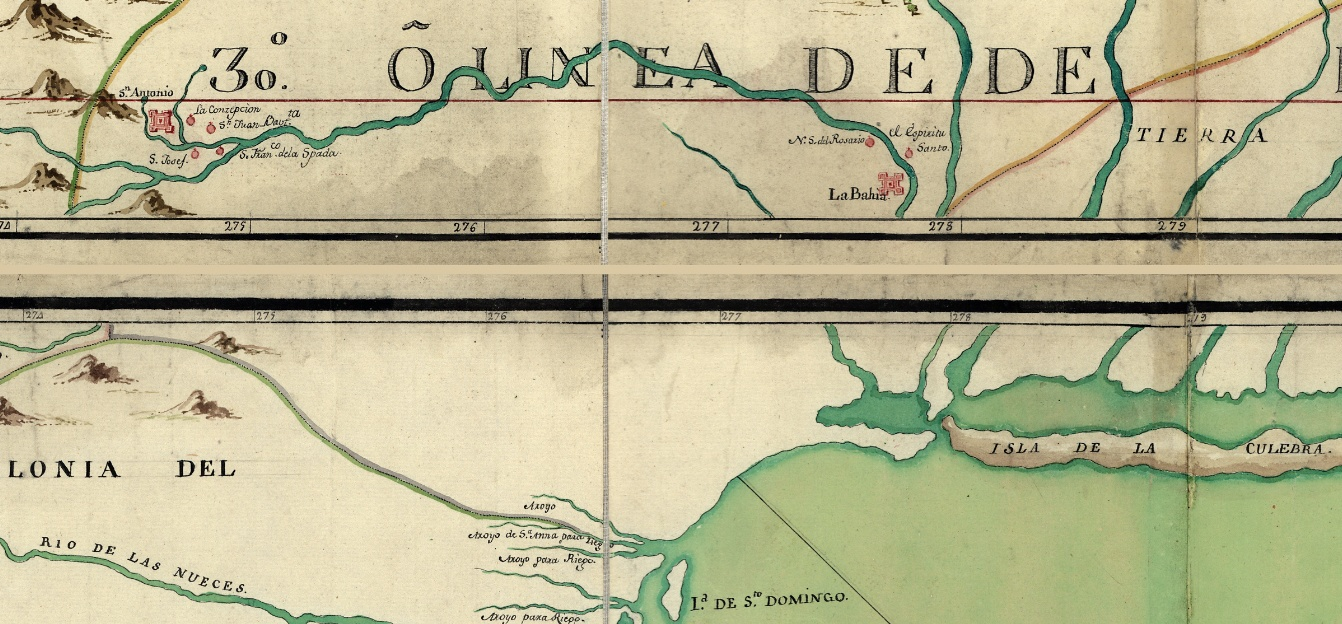
1769 map depicting Presidio La Bahia

With the conclusion of the Seven Years' War in 1767, France ceded Louisiana, and French claims to Texas, to Spain. With France no longer a threat to Spain's North American interests, the Spanish monarchy commissioned the Marqués de Rubí to inspect all of the presidios on the northern frontier of New Spain and make recommendations for the future. Rubí recommended that several presidios be closed, but that La Bahía be kept and rebuilt in stone. La Bahía was soon ""the only Spanish fortress for the entire Gulf Coast from the mouth of the Rio Grande to the Mississippi River". The presidio now sat at the heart of several major trade and military routes. It quickly became one of the three most important areas in Texas, alongside Béxar and Nacogdoches. A civil settlement, now known as Goliad soon developed near the presidio. By 1804, the settlement had one of only two schools in Texas.

== Mexican independence ==
The Mexican War of Independence began in 1810 at the instigation of Miguel Hidalgo. At the end of November, Texas governor Manuel María de Salcedo received notice that Hidalgo and his confederates Ignacio Allende and Juan Aldama were expected to invade Texas, and that Salcedo was expected to capture them. On January 2, 1812, Salcedo summoned troops throughout Texas to Béxar, leaving La Bahía with a minimal force. Mexican revolutionary Bernardo Gutiérrez de Lara had been in the United States organizing support for the revolution. In early August 1812, his recruits under the name, the Republican Army of the North, invaded Texas. In November, Salcedo led Spanish Army forces to the Guadalupe River to ambush the Republican Army of the North. One of the soldiers was captured, however, and revealed details of the ambush. The invading army turned south to avoid the trap and quickly captured Presidio La Bahía. Salcedo promptly began a siege of the fort. The siege lasted four months, with occasional skirmishes.

Unable to win a decisive victory, Salcedo lifted the siege on February 19, 1813 and turned towards San Antonio de Béxar. The rebels remained in control of the presidio until July or August 1813, when José Joaquín de Arredondo led royalist troops in retaking all of Texas. A member of the Republican Army of the North, Henry Perry, led forces back to Texas in 1817 and attempted to recapture La Bahía. The presidio was reinforced by soldiers from San Antonio, and Perry and his men were defeated on June 18 near Coleto Creek.

La Bahía was again the target of invaders in 1821. After the United States and Spain signed the Adams-Onís Treaty, giving all rights to Texas to Spain, many Americans were angry. On October 4, 1821, the 52 members of the Long Expedition captured La Bahía. Four days later, Colonel Ignacio Pérez arrived with troops from Béxar; Long surrendered. By the end of 1821, Mexico had achieved independence from Spain, and Texas became part of the newly created country.

== Texas Revolution ==
=== Battle of Goliad ===
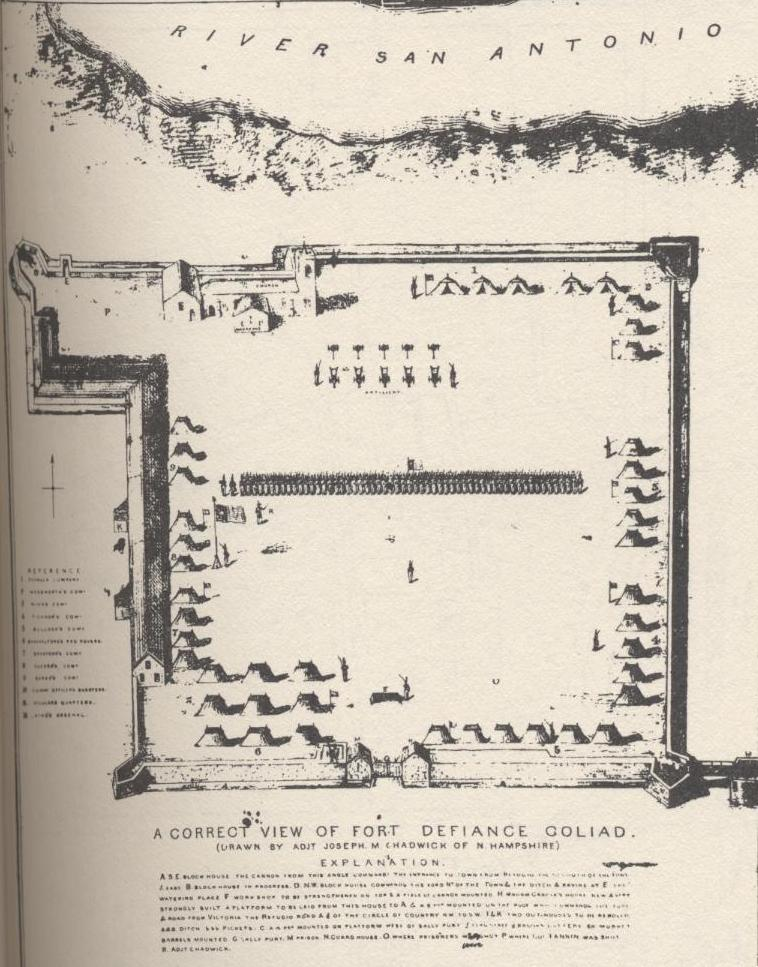
This map of the presidio was drawn in 1836.

By 1835, La Bahía was one of two major garrisons within Mexican Texas, alongside the Alamo at Béxar. Béxar was the political center of Texas, and La Bahía lay halfway between it and the major Texas port of Copano. Within days of the opening of the Texas Revolution in October 1835, members of the Texian militia in Matagorda decided to march on La Bahía to kidnap Mexican General Martín Perfecto de Cos. Other Texas settlers flocked to the march, bringing the number of Texian volunteers to approximately 125 men. Although the Texians learned that Cos had already departed La Bahía to travel to Béxar, they continued their march. Several of the Tejanos who lived near Goliad joined the Texian force, reporting that Colonel Juan López Sandoval commanded only 50 men, far fewer than the number necessary to defend the entire perimeter of the presidio.

In the pre-dawn hours of October 10, 1835, the Texians attacked the presidio. The Texians quickly hacked through a door on the north wall of the fortress and ran to the interior courtyard. Hearing the commotion, the Mexican soldiers had lined the walls to defend the fort. The Mexican soldiers opened fire, hitting Samuel McCulloch, a freed slave, in the shoulder. Texians returned fire for approximately 30 minutes. During a pause in the fighting, a Texian spokesperson yelled out that the Texians would "massacre everyone of you, unless you come out immediately and surrender." The Mexican garrison immediately surrendered.

Over the next several days, more Texian settlers joined the group at La Bahía. Stephen F. Austin, the commander-in-chief of the newly formed Texian Army, ordered that 100 men remain at La Bahía, under the command of Philip Dimmitt, while the rest should join the Texian Army in marching on Cos's troops in Béxar. Texian troops confiscated the provisions they found at the fort. Although they found 300 muskets, most of them were broken and unable to be repaired. The food, clothing, blankets, and other provisions were valued at $10,000. For the next three months, the provisions were parcelled out among companies in the Texian Army. The Texians also gained control of several cannon.

=== Battle of the Alamo support ===
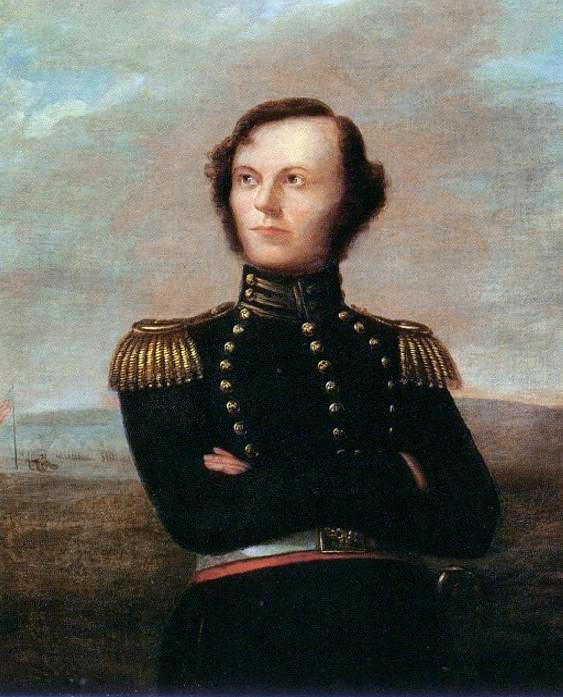
James Fannin

At some point, Colonel James Fannin became the commander of the troops at La Bahía. He renamed the presidio Fort Defiance. In February 1836, President Antonio López de Santa Anna led a large force of Mexican Army troops into Texas to quell the revolution. Santa Anna and part of his force entered Béxar on February 23 and initiated a siege of the Alamo. Alamo commander William B. Travis immediately sent a courier to Fannin, asking him to provide reinforcements to the Alamo. At first unable to make up his mind, Fannin finally decided to ride to the relief of the Alamo. Historian Robert Scott suggests that the trip was initiated after Fannin's objections were overridden by his officers.

On the morning of February 26, 1836, he set out with 320 men, 4 cannon, and several supply wagons for the 90 miles (140 km) march from Goliad to the Alamo. The Goliad garrison had no horses to move the wagons and artillery and were forced to rely on oxen. Barely 200 yards (180 m) into their journey, one of the wagons broke down, and the expedition stopped for repairs. The group then took six hours to cross the waist-deep water of the San Antonio River. By the time they reached the other side it was dark, and the men camped along the river. The cold front reached Goliad that evening, and the poorly-dressed soldiers were "quickly chilled and miserable" in the driving rain. On awakening, Fannin realized that all of the Texian oxen had wandered off, and that his men had neglected to pack food for the journey. It took most of the day for the men to round up the oxen; after two days of travel, Fannin's men had not even ventured 1 mile (1.6 km) from their fort.

In a letter to Acting Governor James Robinson, Fannin said that his officers approached him to ask that the rescue trip be cancelled, as they had received word that General Urrea's army was marching towards Goliad. The officers and men in the expedition claimed that Fannin decided on his own to abort the mission. Several of the men agreed with the decision, with Dr. Barnard writing in his journal, "With but three or four hundred men, mostly on foot, with but a limited supply of provisions, to march a distance of nearly one-hundred miles through uninhabited country for the purpose of relieving a fortress beleaguered by five-thousand men was madness!"

=== Goliad massacre ===
After learning of the fall of the Alamo, General Sam Houston ordered Fannin and his men to abandon La Bahía and fall back to Victoria. They began the retreat on March 19, 1836, carrying with them nine pieces of artillery but little food or water. Fannin showed no signs of haste, and on the banks of Coleto Creek Mexican General José de Urrea and his men attacked. Although the Texians initially repulsed the attacks, they soon ran out of water and Fannin surrendered.

The Texians were escorted back to La Bahía, arriving by March 22, 1836. Although Urrea requested that Santa Anna treat the prisoners with clemency, on March 27, 1836, the men were marched from the fort and executed by Mexican soldiers, in an event known as the Goliad massacre.

== Restoration ==
In the 1960s, local philanthropist Kathryn O'Connor donated $1 million to restore the presidio. Construction took place between 1963 and 1968, under the oversight of architect Raiford Stripling. The building was essentially rebuilt from the ground up to look exactly as it had originally. In his Spanish Missions of Texas, Herbert Malloy Mason remarked that the presidio was one of "the finest examples of Spanish ecclesiastical building on the North American continent".

== Gallery ==
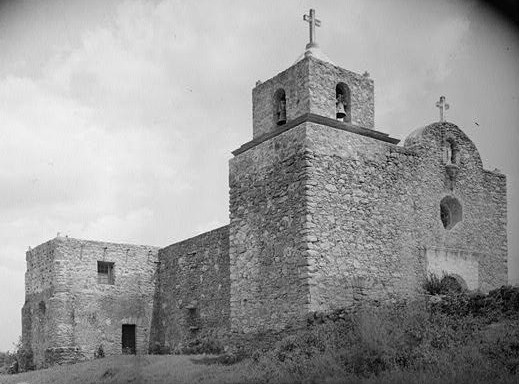
The Presidio chapel as it looked in 1936

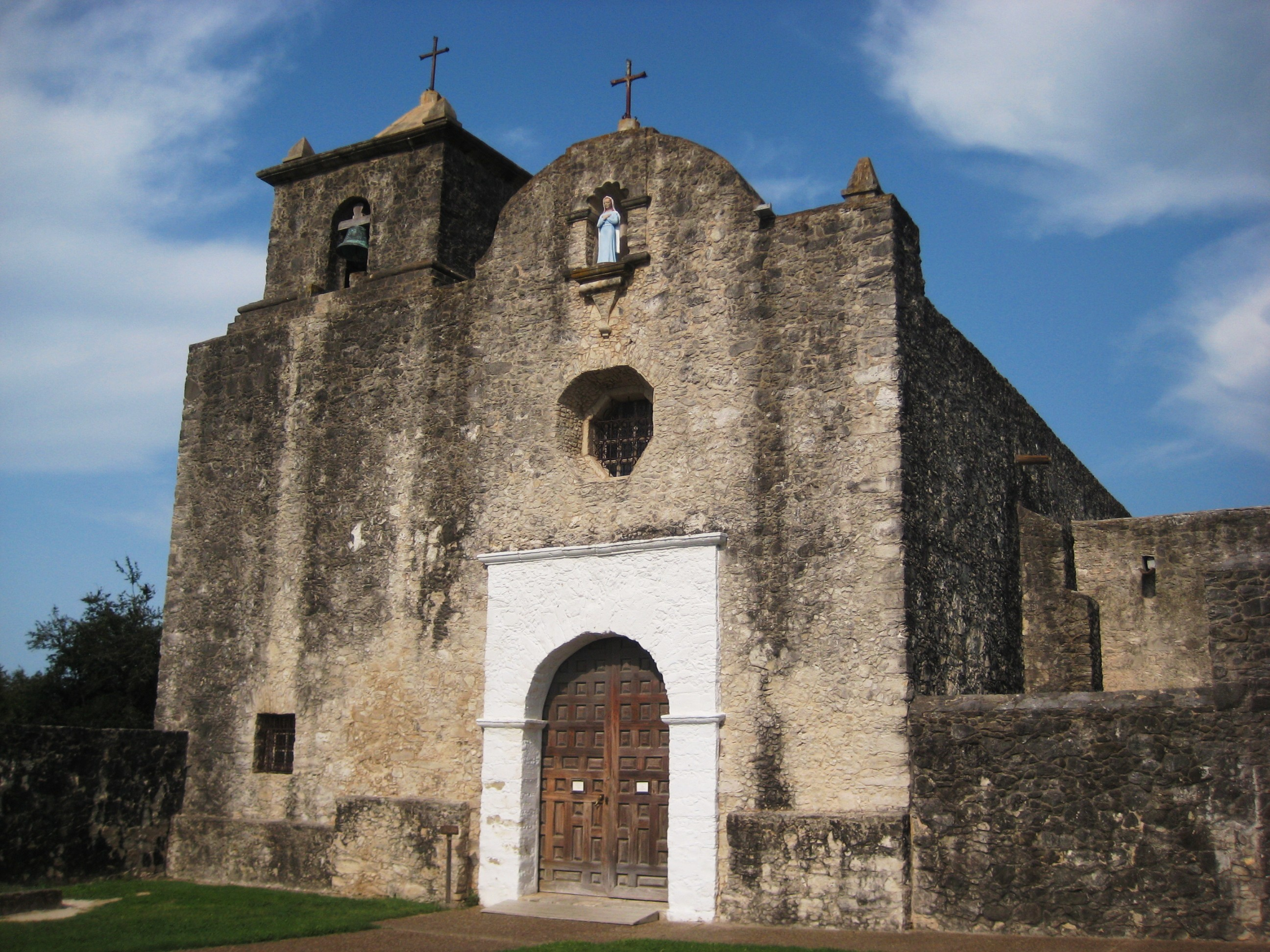
Presidio chapel

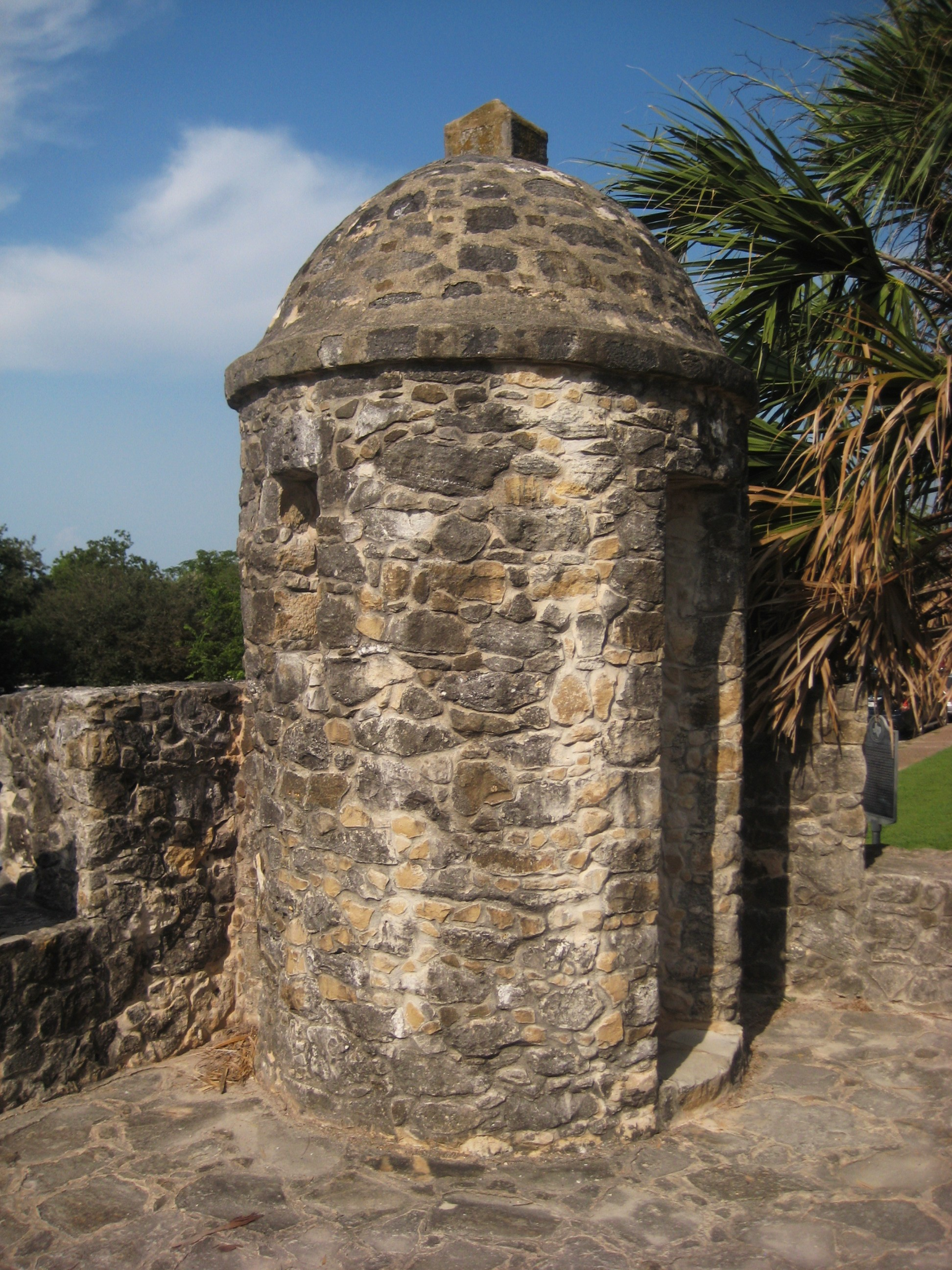
Defensive turret along the walls of the fort

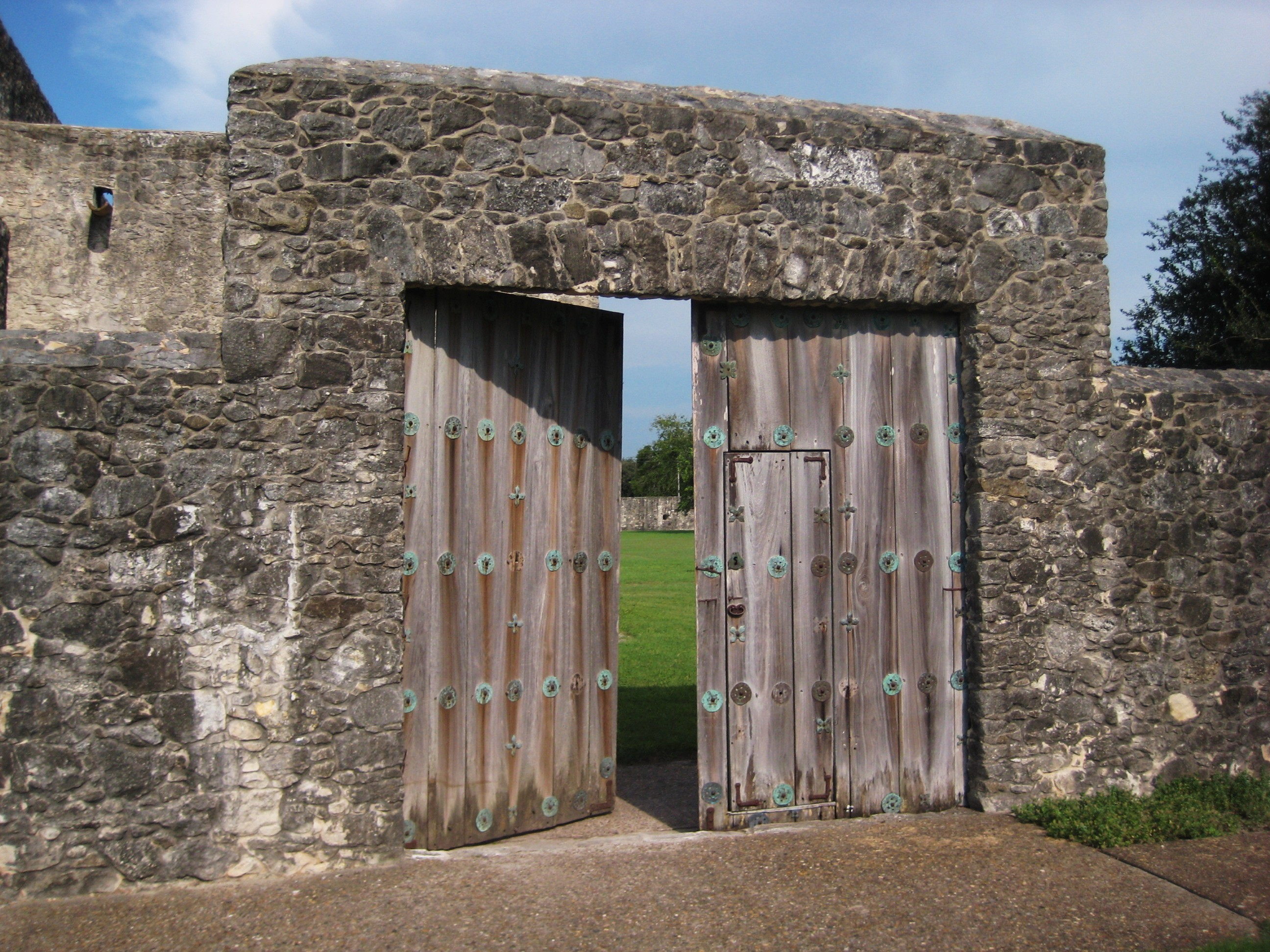
Gate leading from the chapel courtyard to the fortress courtyard

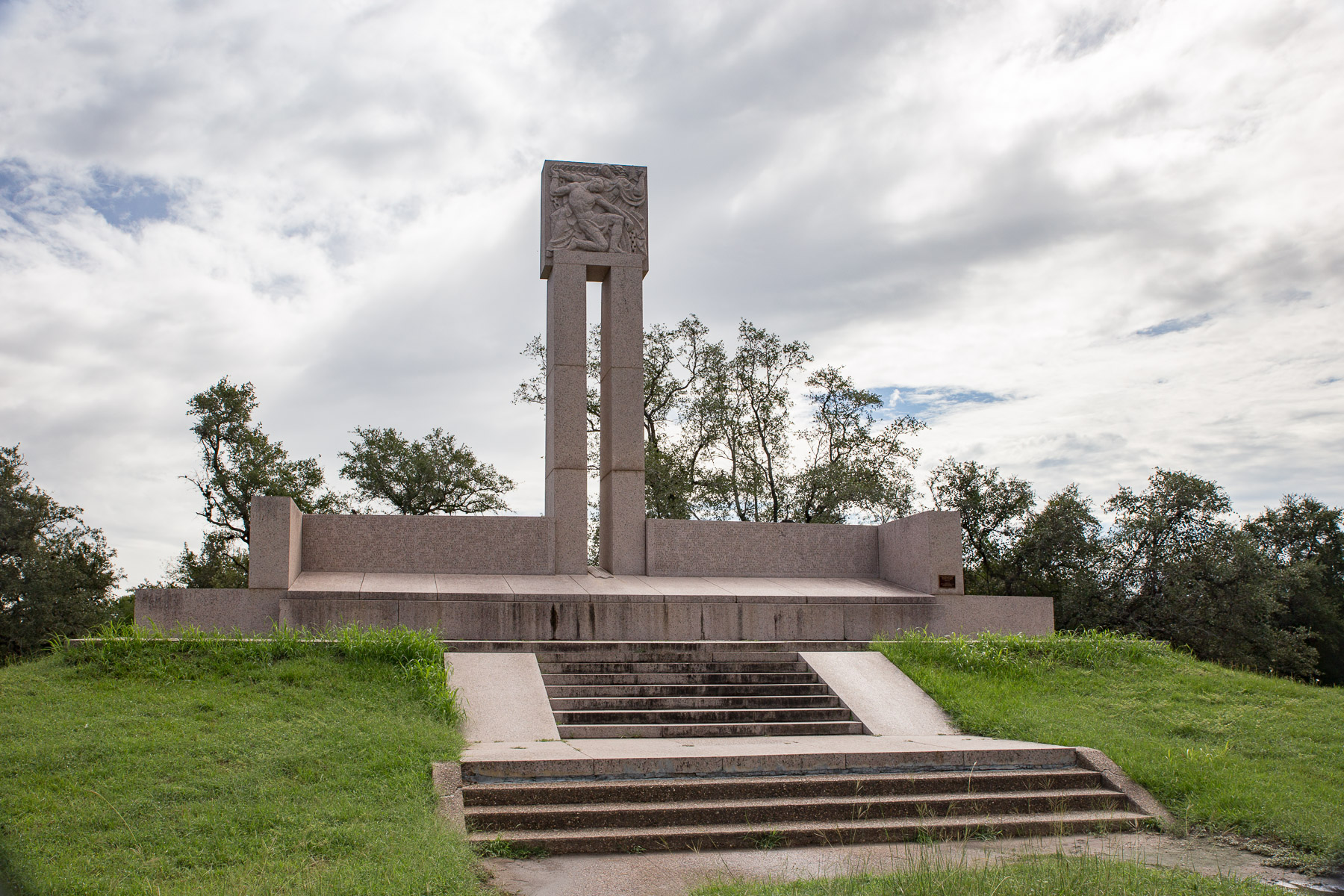
Goliad Massacre Monument

== See also ==
- National Register of Historic Places listings in Goliad County, Texas
- Recorded Texas Historic Landmarks in Goliad County
- Presidio San Luis de las Amarillas
