= John Christopher Columbus Hill =

American engineer (1828–1904)

John Christopher Columbus Hill (November 15, 1828 – February 16, 1904) was a Texan citizen who, at age 13, accompanied his brother and father on the Mier Expedition. He was captured, adopted by the Mexican president Santa Anna, and eventually became a successful engineer in the United States and Mexico.

== Early life and family ==
Hill was born to Asa and Elizabeth Barksdale Hill on November 15, 1828, in Columbus, Georgia, and was the first Anglo-American born there. His family, including older brother James Monroe Hill, who fought at the Battle of San Jacinto, later moved to Texas in what became Fayette County, in central Texas.

At the Battle of San Jacinto the Hills had captured a boy, José Mendes, from Santa Anna's army, and they took the boy to raise and educate. John C.C. Hill had the Mexican boy as a brother and playmate. The taking and raising of captive boys was a custom of wars of the early 1800s, since these boys could later function as interpreters.

José Mendes was later educated with the Hill children at the newly founded Rutersville College in Texas, while John C.C. Hill attended college in Mexico.

== Mier expedition ==
When news came that volunteers were needed to defend San Antonio from the invasion of Mexican General Adrián Woll, Asa Hill and Jeffrey Barksdale Hill, John's brother, decided to go. After much debate, it was decided that John, who wanted desperately to go, would be allowed to go. Before leaving, James Monroe Hill lent John his rifle, saying "John, little brother, I carried this gun at San Jacinto. Since I cannot go, I'll give it to you. Don't you ever surrender it to a Mexican." James was sick, so he could not participate in the expedition.

On September 15, 1842, the Hills met with another group of volunteers, and as they moved towards San Antonio, this group grew until it numbered about 200. There were a series of events occurring that fall: the capture of San Antonio, the Battle of Salado Creek (1842), the Dawson Massacre, and the Somervell Expedition. The Mier Expedition (about 300 men) was an offshoot of the Somervell Expedition (about 700 men).

John's 14th birthday occurred on November 15, 1842. By late December, the group had reached the Mexican border. On December 23, a gun accidentally discharged, killing fourteen-year-old Jessie Yocum, a friend of John. Some speculate it could have been his father, Asa Hill, whose gun had discharged.

On December 25, the Texans under Captain William S. Fisher moved into the town of Mier, and a battle with Mexican troops under General Pedro de Ampudia ensued. In the Battle of Mier, John and several other boys were given the task of killing members of the Mexican artillery corps, and John shot between 12 and 17 Mexican soldiers.

== Aftermath of the Battle of Mier ==
When the Texan soldiers eventually surrendered, they were told to cast down their weapons into a pile. John, however, heeded his brother's request to never give up the rifle and broke his rifle rather than surrender.

This brazen act attracted the attention of the Mexicans, and Hill was brought to General Ampudia. Ampudia took a liking to the boy, and rather than make him a prisoner like his father and brother, took John temporarily into his own care.

== Life in Mexico ==
Eventually, John was taken to Mexico City where he accepted being adopted by the President of Mexico, Antonio López de Santa Anna. He was educated at the Colegio de Mineria, or Mining School.

Later, John helped to translate the Treaty of Guadalupe Hidalgo and to negotiate railroad deals in the United States and Mexico.

In 1855, he married the daughter of a Spanish general and eventually had four children with her. After her death 36 years later, he married the daughter of an English immigrant.

In 1897, he was named an honorary life member of the Texas State Historical Association.
