= Ewen Cameron (soldier) =

19th-century Scottish-Texian soldier, executed in the Black Bean Incident

- Born: 1811; Scotland
- Died: April 26, 1843 (aged 31–32); Perote, Veracruz, Mexico
- Cause of death: Execution by firing squad
- Resting place: Perote, Veracruz, Mexico
- Occupation: Soldier
- Years active: 1836?-1842
- Known for: Mier Expedition

Ewen Cameron (c. 1811 – April 26, 1843) was an officer in the Army of the Republic of Texas, who participated in the ill-fated Mier Expedition.

== Biography ==
Cameron was born circa 1811 in Scotland and was named in honor of Sir Ewen Cameron of Lochiel, 17th Chief of Clan Cameron. He emigrated first to Kentucky and came to Texas in 1836, arriving just after the Texas Revolution.

In late December 1842, the Mier Expedition was a raid on the Mexican border settlement of Ciudad Mier, which turned into the Batalla de Mier when the Mexican Army arrived. Cameron and the other Texans were taken prisoner, after inflicting a large number of casualties on the other side.

At a location called El Rancho Salado, a jar containing 159 white beans and 17 black beans was presented to the Texan prisoners. Each man drew a bean from the jar, while blindfolded. The 17 Texan prisoners who drew black beans were executed at dusk by a Mexican firing squad. This is known as the Black Bean Episode and occurred on March 25, 1843, three months after the Battle of Mier.

Cameron had selected a white bean, which should have saved his life. Yet he had earned the hostility of Mexican Colonel Antonio Canales Rosillo for his role in his embarrassing defeat in the Battle at Fort of Lipantitlán, Texas, in July 1842, and for Cameron's role in leading an escape attempt. Colonel Canales urged the Mexican dictator Antonio López de Santa Anna to have Cameron executed.

On April 25, 1843, the prisoners who had drawn white beans were being moved to Mexico City. As they traveled, a courier arrived with orders from Santa Anna for Cameron's execution. Cameron was shot by a firing squad at Perote Prison in the state of Veracruz, the next morning, April 26, 1843. Cameron refused to confess to a priest, and declined the offer of a blindfold, declaring, "For the liberty of Texas, Ewen Cameron can look death in the face." He then opened his hunting shirt and yelled at his executioners, "Fuego!" (Fire!).

Cameron was presumably buried at Perote, Veracruz. Therefore, his remains were not among those exhumed a few years later and returned to Texas.

Cameron County, Texas, and Cameron, Texas, are named for Ewen Cameron.
