= William A. A. Wallace =

Texas ranger (1817–1899)

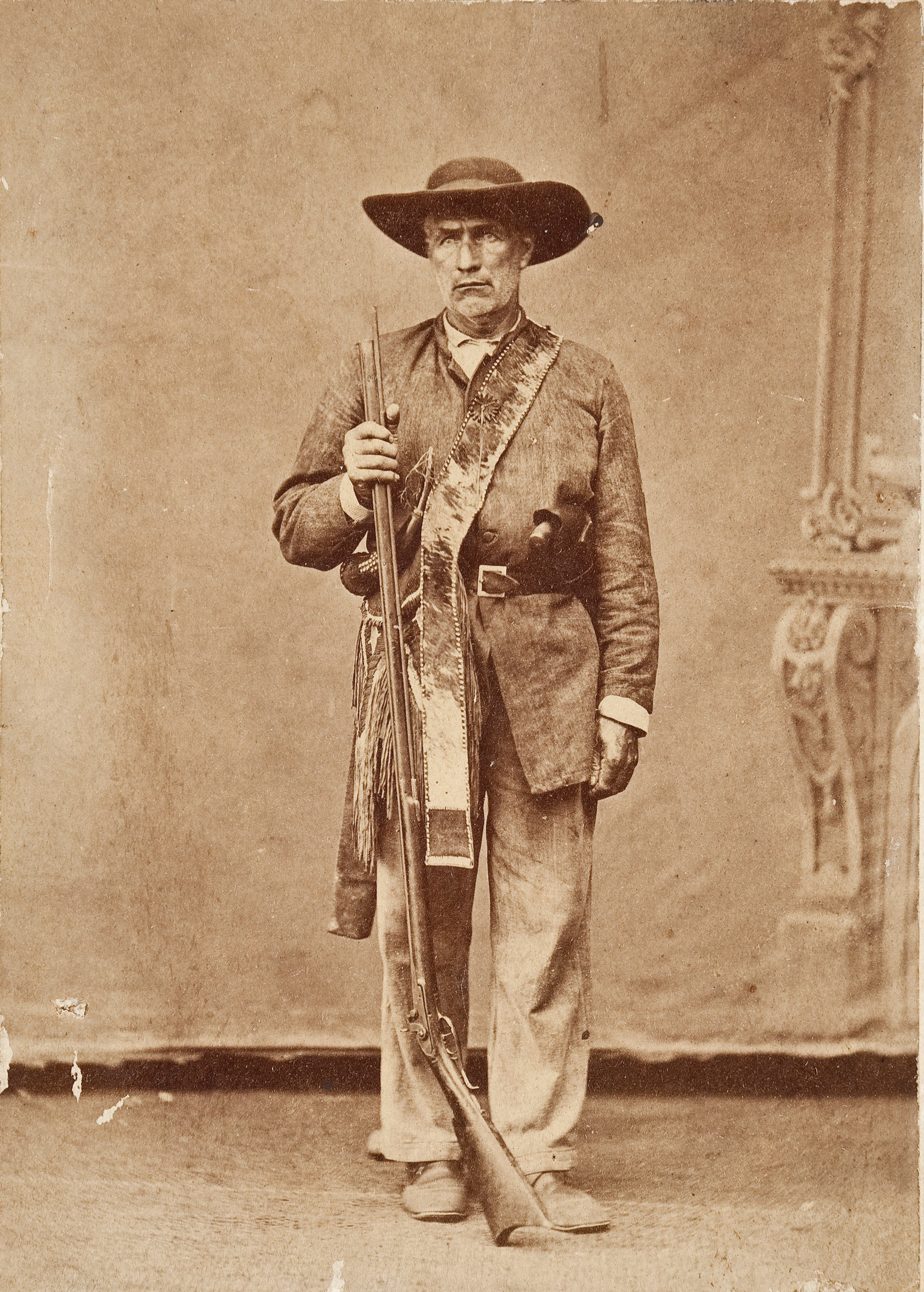
- Wallace circa 1872
- Born: William Alexander Anderson Wallace; April 3, 1817; Lexington, Virginia
- Died: January 7, 1899 (aged 81); Bigfoot, Texas
- Burial place: Texas State Cemetery
- Military career
- Allegiance: Republic of Texas; United States
- Branch: Texas Ranger Division
- Nickname: "Bigfoot"
- Conflicts: Mexican Invasions of Texas: Battle of Salado Creek; Battle of Hondo River; Battle of Mier; Black Bean Incident; Mexican–American War: Battle of Monterrey; Comanche Wars American Civil War

William Alexander Anderson "Bigfoot" Wallace (April 3, 1817 – January 7, 1899) was a Texas Ranger who took part in many of the military conflicts of the Republic of Texas and the United States in the 1840s, including the Mexican–American War.

== Biography ==
Wallace was born in Lexington, Virginia, to parents of Scots-Irish descent. When he learned that a brother and a cousin had been killed in the Goliad Massacre, he set out for Texas to "take pay out of the Mexicans"; years later, he confessed that he believed the account had been squared. Wallace was a large man, at 6'2" (188 cm) and 240 pounds (109 kg) in his prime.

Wallace fought at the battles of Salado Creek, Battle of Hondo River, and Mier. Some of his most graphic memories were of his experiences in Perote Prison after having survived the Black Bean Incident. Wallace participated in the Battle of Monterrey during the Mexican–American War. As a member of the John Coffee Hays's Rangers, Wallace killed "as many inoffensive Mexicans as he could to avenge his imprisonment after the Mier Expedition". Wallace later participated in the Comanche Wars.

In the 1850s, Wallace commanded a ranger company of his own, fighting border bandits as well as Native Americans. He was an expert at trailing and was frequently called upon to track down runaway slaves trying to get to Mexico. He drove a mail hack from San Antonio to El Paso and on one occasion, after losing his mules to Comanches, walked to El Paso and ate twenty-seven eggs at the first Mexican house he came to before going on to town for a full meal.

During the Civil War, he helped guard the frontier against Comanches. At one time, Wallace had a small ranch on the Medina River on land granted to him by the state of Texas.

The later years of his life were spent in South Texas in the vicinity of a small village named Bigfoot. He never married. He was a mellow and convivial soul who liked to sit in a roomy rawhide-bottomed chair in the shade of his shanty and tell the stories of his career. Wallace was personally honest but liked to "stretch the blanket" and embellish his stories.

Wallace died on January 7, 1899, and shortly thereafter the Texas legislature appropriated money for moving his body to the Texas State Cemetery.

"Bigfoot" Wallace is the namesake of the town of Bigfoot, Texas in Frio County and of Wallace Creek in Bandera County.

The Big Foot Wallace museum is a local museum dedicated to Wallace and houses artifacts related to Wallace, as well as those of the community.

== Media and literary portrayals ==
Larry McMurtry included a fictionalized version of Wallace in his Lonesome Dove prequel, Dead Man's Walk. In this book, Wallace is one of the Rangers who signs on with Augustus McCrae and Woodrow Call to go on the Texan Santa Fe Expedition. After they are captured by Mexican authorities, they are made to draw beans to decide who will live or die, a method borrowed from the Mier Expedition. Unlike his real-life counterpart, Wallace in this story draws a black bean, and is executed. In the film, he is played by Keith Carradine. In the History Channel 5-part television miniseries, Texas Rising, Wallace is played by actor Robert Baker.

Wallace is portrayed as a mentor to the young cattle baron John Chisum in a semi-biographical 2019 novel by Russ Brown titled Miss Chisum.

== Bibliography ==
Duval, John (1871). The Adventures Of Big-Foot Wallace: The Texas Ranger And Hunter (1871). Amazon: Kessinger Publishing, LLC. ISBN 1-167-21755-1.
