= Ciudad Mier =

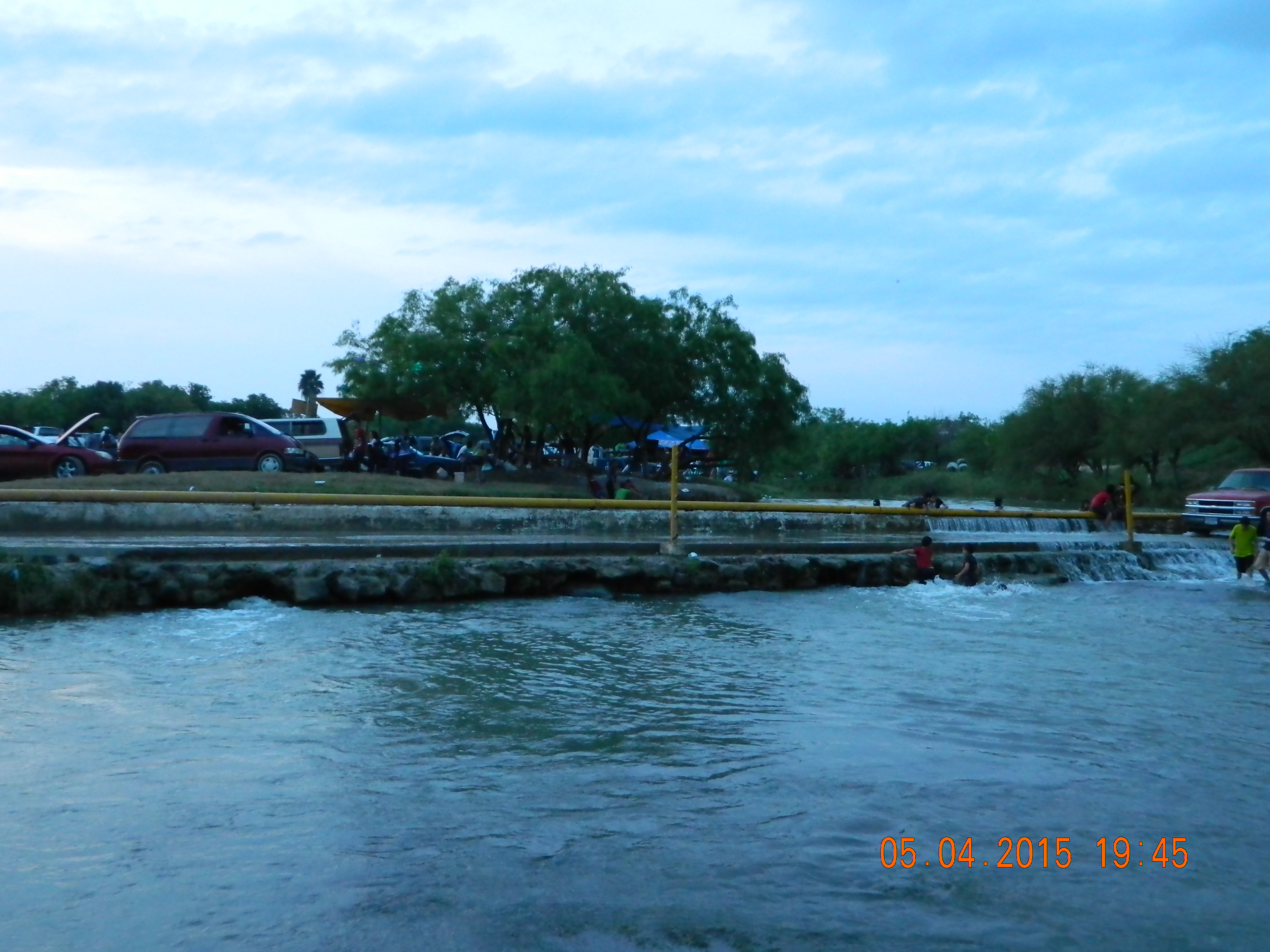

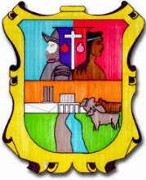
- Coat of arms
- Nickname: Paso del Cántaro
- Location in Tamaulipas Ciudad Mier (Mexico)
- Coordinates: 26°25′50″N 99°8′55″W
- Country: Mexico
- State: Tamaulipas
- Municipality: Mier
- Founded: March 6, 1753
- Founded as: Villa del Paso del Cántaro
- Founder: José de Escandón
- Named for: Servando Teresa de Mier

Government
  - Municipal President: Dr. Roberto Gonzales Gonzales

Population (2010)
  - Total: 4,762 (city proper)
- Time zone: UTC–06:00 (Zona Centro)
  - Summer (DST): UTC–05:00 (DST)

Mier (Spanish: [mjeɾ]), also known as El Paso del Cántaro, is a city in Mier Municipality in Tamaulipas, located in northern Mexico near the Rio Grande, just south of Falcon Dam. It is 90 miles (140 km) northeast of Monterrey on Mexican Federal Highway 2. (26°28'N 99°10'W)

In 1990, the population was recorded at 6,190. By the 2010 census, it had dropped to 4,762 inhabitants. It has an agricultural economy centered on cotton, sugar cane, corn, and livestock.

== History ==
The town was founded on March 6, 1753. The land was originally owned by Felix de Almandoz. Land later passed on to General Prudencio Basterra who married Felix's sister Ana Maria. 19 Families from Camargo formed the new settlement. In 1753 Captain Jose Christoval Ramirez and his wife were part of the nineteen families who settled in Mier. He was a resident of Mier but applied for Porcion 17 in Revilla (Guerrero Viejo), where he had a ranch at a place called La Santisima Trinidad.

The town is called Mier because the governor of Nuevo León from 1710 to 1714, Francisco Mier y Torre, used to spend the night there on his way to Texas. It began to be called Estancia de Mier and then simply Mier. This is where the steamboats used to stop when they came up the Río Bravo.

=== Conflicts with the Republic of Texas ===
On his return to power, General Santa Anna sent a force of seven hundred men, mostly mounted Mexican troops under the command of General Ráfael Vásquez, to occupy San Antonio in early March 1842.

The "war hawks" in the Texas Congress forced President Sam Houston to act. The President ordered General Alexander Somervell to command the assembling volunteers at San Antonio. Men of all kinds came pouring into town, some shoeless, most horseless, some seeking adventure, and others of the criminal sort, wishing only to sack Mexican towns and villages. As Houston had hoped, Somervell acted indecisively. Soon, considerable looting of Tejano stores in San Antonio, coupled with out-and-out insubordination, broke up the volunteers before they could march on Mexico and start a major war.

Relations between Texas and Mexico worsened, especially after the Mexican general Adrián Woll and fourteen hundred troops again captured San Antonio in September. Houston once again summoned Somervell to organize and lead the volunteers but hoped that the Texas general would remain north of the Nueces River. But as the army grew to 750 men, even Somervell realized that he would have to act. His volunteers had taken on an identity of their own; had he refused to march, the troops would have left him.

The army was slowly breaking up as a result of the disorder and looting, after Laredo was captured. The 500 who remained followed Somervell south to Guerrero, where pillaging occurred. Here a mutiny erupted in which 189 men followed William S. Fisher, Ewen Cameron, and Thomas Green into the Mexican town of Mier.

On December 23, 1842, Fisher and most of the men crossed the Rio Grande and entered the Ciudad Mier, where they met no resistance. They demanded supplies from the town, which the town's alcalde promised to deliver. The troops withdrew and waited. In the meantime, a large detachment of Mexican troops arrived in the town. On December 25, the two sides engaged in a bloody battle that lasted almost 24 hours. The Texans sustained thirty casualties and ran out of food, water, and ammunition. More than 200 Texans surrendered to Mexican forces, unaware that they had mauled the Mexican troops to an almost unbelievable degree, inflicting an astounding 800 casualties.

As far as the Mexicans were concerned, the Texans were privateers on an unauthorized raid and entitled to no consideration as military prisoners of war. They were sentenced to death and then taken on a forced march to Mexico City. Fisher was separated from the group, but the men selected a leader from among themselves, a Scottish-born captain named Ewen Cameron. Along the way, Cameron led most of the prisoners in an escape attempt. The Texans tried to make a run back for the border, but they had not bargained on the harsh and dry conditions in the mountains. All but three were recaptured and returned to the town of Salado, Tamaulipas.

When he heard about the break-out, Antonio López de Santa Anna ordered that the recaptured prisoners, some 176 men, be put to death immediately. The Governor of Coahuila, Francisco Mexía, refused to carry out the order and pleaded with foreign ministers in Mexico City to persuade the president to change his mind. (Santa Anna was out of office from 26 October 1842 to 4 March 1843, with Nicolás Bravo serving in the Presidential capacity.)

What happened next became known as the "Black Bean Episode." Santa Anna promised the foreign ministers that he would show mercy, and then modified his decree to order the decimation of the Mier prisoners; in other words, the execution of every tenth man. At El Rancho Salado, which was presumably in the state of Coahuila, on March 25, 1843 – three months after the Battle of Mier – the prisoners were forced to draw a bean from a jar (while blindfolded) containing 159 white beans and 17 black beans. At dusk that day, those unlucky enough to draw a black bean were shot to death, in two groups.

Cameron had drawn a white bean, which should have saved his life. However, he had earned the hostility of Mexican Colonel Antonio Canales Rosillo, for his role in the embarrassing defeat in his battle (July 1842 at Fort Lipantitlán, near Corpus Christi, Texas), and for leading the escape attempt. Canales intervened with Santa Anna, and he agreed. Cameron was shot by a firing squad at Perote Prison on April 26, 1843.

The remaining prisoners were put to work on a road gang. In September 1843, most of them were confined at the notorious Perote Prison in the state of Veracruz, while a few were separated from the group and scattered into other prisons around Mexico. Over the next few months, some managed to escape, while others died of wounds, disease, and starvation. Diplomats from the United States and Great Britain worked for the release of the Mier prisoners. They were eventually paroled in piecemeal fashion, with the last prisoner going home in September 1844.

In 1847, during the Mexican–American War, the remains of the men executed in the Black Bean Episode were retrieved from Mexico and interred near La Grange, Texas (with those who died in the Dawson Massacre), at which site has been established a monument.

=== Fidel Castro in Mier ===
One historic event from Mier occurred in 1956 involving Fidel Castro. At that time Ciudad Mier had near 4,000 inhabitants. Its isolation and close proximity with the U.S. border led to it becoming a mecca for smugglers.

Fidel Castro had learned of the fashion in which any merchandise could be crossed illegally by the Rio Grande into Mier. At that time Castro was preparing for a revolution in Cuba and was meeting with leaders in Mexico City. Castro needed weapons and went to Mier to obtain them. Mier town historian Antonio Guerra said only the best smugglers received the assignment.

The operation was assigned to Juan 'El Chapiado' González, from Mier, and Santiago 'El Chago' Guerra, from Agualeguas (Nuevo León). These men acquired the weapons in the United States then passed them over the Rio Grande in boats. When they disembarked the weapons were then unloaded at the Los Guajes Ranch, owned by Jesus 'El Gavilan' Ramírez.

Family and acquaintances of these men relate that after hiding the weapons, the group was directed to travel to the Cantina de la Loma del Peligro bar, many miles down the highway leading from Mier to Ciudad Guerrero. There they met the buyer of the merchandise. In the bar it was agreed that the weapons would continue south, leaving Mier to Aldamas. From there they would travel to Veracruz where they would be loaded into a yacht named Granma.

Castro later confirmed that the weapons leading to the Cuban revolution indeed passed through Mier with the help of Mexican smugglers.

== Abandonment ==
Ciudad Mier was largely abandoned in 2010 due to the bloody turf war between the Gulf Cartel and Los Zetas after the death of Antonio Cárdenas Guillén, the drug boss of the Gulf organization. The fight between the drug cartels resulted in the death or kidnapping of all the police forces in the municipality of Ciudad Mier.

Approximately 95% of the population left Ciudad Mier and went to Miguel Alemán, Tamaulipas, as a result of the violence generated by the drug cartels in the Mexican drug war. Consequently, the president of Mexico, Felipe Calderón, ordered the creation of a military headquarters in the area, and now more than 600 military elements patrol the streets of Mier.

== Municipal presidents of the city ==
- Nicolás Farías (1930–1933)
- Severo Barrera (1934–1936)
- Jesús García Gutiérrez (1937–1940)
- Florentino Ramírez Canales (1941–1942)
- Agustín Hinojosa Hinojosa (1943–1945)
- Valentín Barrera (1946–1948)
- Marcial Garza Sarabia (1949–1951)
- Julio Ramírez-Mateo García (1952–1954)
- Gerónimo Ramírez (1955–1957)
- Marco Hinojosa Villela (1958–1960)
- Álvaro Barrera Garza (1961–1962)
- Leonte Garza y Garza (1963–1965)
- Mauro Smith Bazán (1966–1968)
- Álvaro Barrera Garza (1969–1971)
- Roel Ramírez Ayala (1972–1974)
- Francisco Rodríguez Cavázos (1975–1977)
- Vladimir Treviño Rodríguez (1978–1980)
- Roberto González Guajardo (1981–1983)
- Ignacio Peña Alemán (1984–1986)
- Álvaro Barrera Ramírez (1987–1989)
- Jesús Humberto Hinojosa Vivanco (1990–1992)
- Enrique Maldonado Quintanilla (1993–1995)
- Jesús Ángel Guerra Mancías (1996–1998)
- Jesús Humberto Hinojosa Vivanco. (1999–2001)
- Abdón Canales Díaz (2002–2004)
- José Herbey Ramos Ramos (2005–2007)
- Roberto Gonzales Gonzales (2013–2016)
- Roberto González Hinojosa (2016–2018)
