= Arroyo Seco Fight =

Coordinates: 29.6327°N 99.4150°W

Arroyo Seco Fight / Battle of Seco Creek
- Part of Texas-Indian Wars
Date	August 10, 1838
Location	On Seco Creek in Medina County, Texas
Result	Texan victory

Belligerents
Republic of Texas	Comanche

Commanders and leaders
Henry Wax Karnes	Chief Essowakenny; Chief Isemani †; Chief Casimero

Strength
21 men	200 warriors

Casualties and losses
1 wounded	20 killed and 20 wounded

The Arroyo Seco Fight, also known as the Battle of Seco Creek, was a clash between militia and Rangers of the Republic of Texas and a large Comanche war party traveling with Chief Essowakkenny, which took place on the Seco Creek in Medina County, Texas, on August 10, 1838.

== Background ==
On December 28, 1837, Colonel Henry Wax Karnes was authorized to raise eight companies of Texas Rangers to patrol and defend the frontier of Texas. On August 10, 1838, Colonel Karnes and his men camped on Seco Creek. Members of the patrol included Jack Hays and Benjamin F. Cage.

== Battle ==
While the twenty-one encamped on the Seco Creek rested their horses, the unit was suddenly attacked by about 200 Comanches on horseback. Colonel Karnes alerted his men to take cover in the ravine, using the thick brush for cover. Though outnumbered about ten to one, the Texans returned fire in a rotating sequence of six or seven men at a time to give some time to reload as others fired. This allowed them to hold their ground. Although the Comanches fought fiercely, fighting, regrouping, and unleashing three separate attacks, Chief Isemani was killed and Chief Casemiro was badly wounded. Twenty Comanches lay dead on the ground, with as many wounded. They then gathered them and returned to their village.

Although an overwhelming victory for the Texans, Karnes, who had been directing the battle from a bluff, was wounded, and several of the Rangers' horses were shot dead.
