= Bigfoot, Texas =

- Census-designated place (CDP) and Unincorporated Community
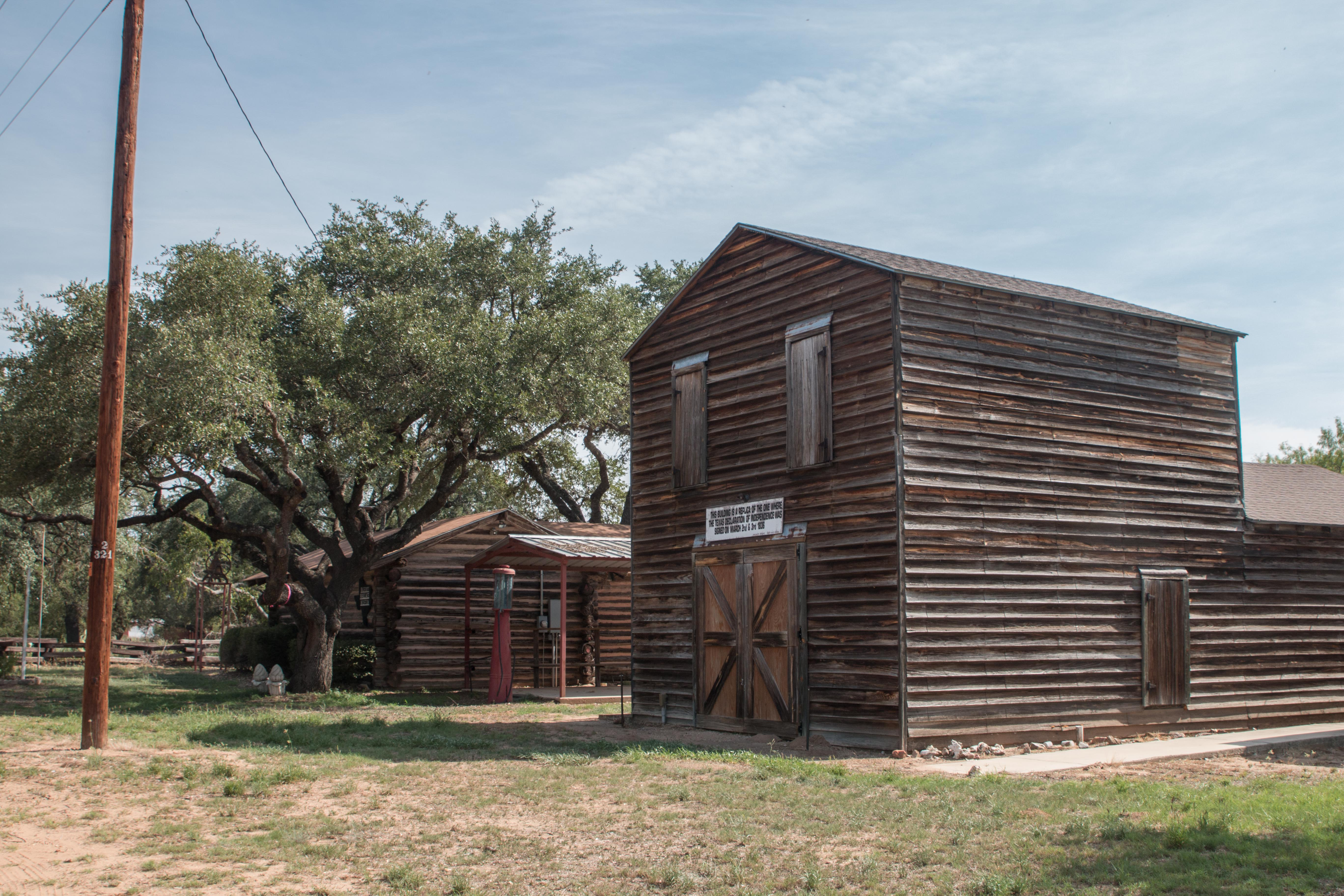

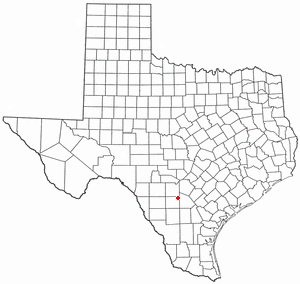
- Location of Bigfoot, Texas

- Coordinates: 29°03′49″N 98°52′15″W
- Country: United States
- State: Texas
- County: Frio

Area
  - Total: 23.92 sq mi (61.96 km^{2})
  - Land: 23.91 sq mi (61.92 km^{2})
  - Water: 0.015 sq mi (0.04 km^{2})
- Elevation: 607 ft (185 m)

Population (2020)
  - Total: 480
  - Density: 20/sq mi (7.8/km^{2})
- Time zone: UTC-6 (Central (CST))
  - Summer (DST): UTC-5 (CDT)
- ZIP code: 78005
- Area code: 830
- FIPS code: 48-08164
- GNIS feature ID: 2407846

Bigfoot is an unincorporated community and census-designated place (CDP) in Frio County, Texas, United States. As of the 2020 census, Bigfoot had a population of 480.

== History ==
The area was first settled around 1865 and was originally called Connally's Store, named after Bob Connally. By 1880, D.T. Winters had set up a cotton gin and gristmill in the area. When James Connally established a post office in 1883, he named the community Bigfoot, in honor of Texas Ranger William A.A. “Bigfoot” Wallace, a well-known local resident.

A Baptist church was formed during the 1880s, and by 1890, the town had a general store and around 25 residents. A public school was founded in the 1890s, and had three teachers and 105 students by 1907. Much of the business district was destroyed by a fire in 1903. In the 1940s, Bigfoot featured a church, a school, several businesses, and scattered homes. The local school was merged with the one in Devine, Texas in 1949. The community expanded again in the 1950s with the development of the nearby Bigfoot oilfield.

Currently, Bigfoot still has a post office, a couple of businesses, and three churches. The town is also home to the Bigfoot Wallace Museum—an exact replica of William A.A. “Bigfoot” Wallace's home.

== Geography ==
Bigfoot is located in the northeast corner of Frio County. It is bordered to the north by Medina County and to the east by Atascosa County. Texas State Highway 173 passes through the northeastern part of the CDP, leading northwest 7 miles (11 km) to Devine and southeast 20 miles (32 km) to Jourdanton. Downtown San Antonio is 41 miles (66 km) to the north, and Pearsall, the Frio County seat, is 21 miles (34 km) to the southwest.

According to the United States Census Bureau, the Bigfoot CDP has a total area of 23.9 square miles (62.0 km^{2}), of which 0.02 square miles (0.04 km^{2}), or 0.06%, is water.

== Demographics ==
Historical population
Census	Pop.	Note	%±
2000	304		—
2010	450		48.0%
2020	480		6.7%
U.S. Decennial Census; 1850–1900 1910; 1920 1930 1940; 1950 1960 1970; 1980 1990 2000; 2010 2020

Bigfoot first appeared as a census designated place in the 2000 U.S. census.

=== 2020 census ===
Bigfoot CDP, Texas – Racial and ethnic composition Note: the US Census treats Hispanic/Latino as an ethnic category. This table excludes Latinos from the racial categories and assigns them to a separate category. Hispanics/Latinos may be of any race.
Race / Ethnicity (NH = Non-Hispanic)	Pop 2000	Pop 2010	Pop 2020	% 2000	% 2010	% 2020
White alone (NH)	167	246	292	54.93%	54.67%	60.83%
Black or African American alone (NH)	0	2	4	0.00%	0.44%	0.83%
Native American or Alaska Native alone (NH)	0	1	0	0.00%	0.22%	0.00%
Asian alone (NH)	0	1	0	0.00%	0.22%	0.00%
Native Hawaiian or Pacific Islander alone (NH)	0	0	0	0.00%	0.00%	0.00%
Other race alone (NH)	0	0	0	0.00%	0.00%	0.00%
Mixed race or Multiracial (NH)	1	8	10	0.33%	1.78%	2.08%
Hispanic or Latino (any race)	136	192	174	44.74%	42.67%	36.25%
Total	304	450	480	100.00%	100.00%	100.00%

=== 2000 census ===
As of the census of 2000, there were 304 people, 110 households, and 91 families residing in the CDP. The population density was 12.7 people per square mile (4.9/km^{2}). There were 127 housing units at an average density of 5.3/sq mi (2.1/km^{2}). The racial makeup of the CDP was 81.58% White, 16.12% from other races, and 2.30% from two or more races. Hispanic or Latino of any race were 44.74% of the population.

There were 110 households, out of which 31.8% had children under the age of 18 living with them, 66.4% were married couples living together, 12.7% had a female householder with no husband present, and 16.4% were non-families. 14.5% of all households were made up of individuals, and 9.1% had someone living alone who was 65 years of age or older. The average household size was 2.76 and the average family size was 3.01.

In the CDP, the population was spread out, with 25.0% under the age of 18, 7.6% from 18 to 24, 25.7% from 25 to 44, 29.3% from 45 to 64, and 12.5% who were 65 years of age or older. The median age was 39 years. For every 100 females, there were 105.4 males. For every 100 females age 18 and over, there were 101.8 males.

The median income for a household in the CDP was $19,375, and the median income for a family was $17,083. Males had a median income of $22,917 versus $28,750 for females. The per capita income for the CDP was $14,250. About 23.7% of families and 29.1% of the population were below the poverty line, including 38.2% of those under the age of eighteen and 27.5% of those 65 or over, the area code here is 830.

== Education ==
Bigfoot is served by the Devine Independent School District.
