= Battle of the Salado =

1842 battle between the Republic of Texas and Mexico

Coordinates: 29.4879°N 98.4178°W

- Part of the Woll Expedition
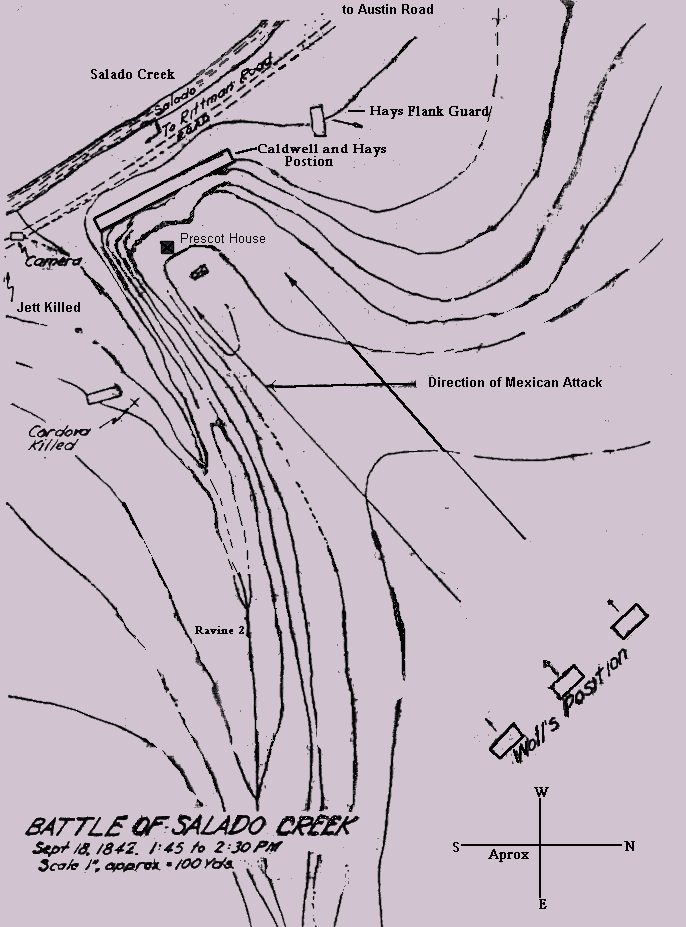
- Map of the Battle of the Salado
Date	September 17, 1842
Location	Salado Creek outside San Antonio, Texas
Result	Texan victory

Belligerents
Republic of Texas	Mexico; Cherokee

Commanders and leaders
Mathew Caldwell; John C. Hays	Adrián Woll

Strength
~220: -140 militia -80 rangers	1,600: -900 infantry -500 cavalry -200 native scouts 2 artillery pieces

Casualties and losses
1 killed 9–12 wounded	60 killed Hundreds wounded
- Casualties for the Dawson Massacre are not included

The Battle of the Salado was a decisive engagement in 1842 which repulsed the final Mexican invasion of the Republic of Texas. Colonel Mathew Caldwell of the Texas Rangers led just over 200 militia against an army of 1,600 Mexican Army soldiers and Cherokee warriors, and defeated them outside of San Antonio de Bexar along Salado Creek. As a result of this action, French-Mexican commander General Adrián Woll retreated south and back into Mexico.

== Background ==
On January 9, 1842 word came from General Mariano Arista in Monterrey that Mexico was planning to invade and retake Texas. He stated that all who would not resist would be given amnesty and protection during this invasion. Texian invasions of a year earlier, in which the Texians attempted to annex New Mexico during the Santa Fe Expedition, had stirred up Mexico's interest in retaking Texas.

General Ráfael Vásquez occupied Goliad, Refugio, Victoria and captured San Antonio in March. The surprised Texians, without a force large enough to hold the town, evacuated to Seguin without a fight. The invaders held San Antonio, raising the Mexican flag over the city, for a few days before returning to Mexico. A Texian force was organized at the Manuel N. Flores ranch in Seguin that pursued and ensured Vasquez's flight from Texas.

In June a smaller force under the command of Colonel Antonio Canales Rosillo raided southern Texas until being repulsed in an engagement near Fort Lipantitlan, west of Corpus Christi.

In August 1842 the Mexican army crossed the border intent on invading and retaking Texas. French Mexican General Adrián Woll commanded the September expedition which included 500 cavalry, 900 infantry, 200 Cherokee scouts and two artillery pieces. On September 11, 1842 the Mexicans arrived in San Antonio. Mayor John William Smith assigned Captain Salvador Flores to command 100 local Tejanos against the Mexican invaders. However, the larger Mexican forces captured the city after a skirmish with Chauncy Johnson's force of sixty-two Texians positioned in houses facing the town plaza. Woll had orders to hold the city, wait for reinforcements, and withdraw from San Antonio by mid October.

The alarm was quickly raised and Texian militias began assembling to fight Woll's troops. Colonel Mathew Caldwell, a veteran of the Texas Revolution who had just recently been released after capture during the Santa Fe Expedition, began forming a contingent in Seguin. With 140 Texian volunteers, Caldwell marched for Cibolo Creek, twenty miles from San Antonio. A little later Caldwell moved his camp thirteen miles closer to the city along Salado Creek near the Prescot House. Altogether, about 220 Texians were assembled to fight the Mexicans.

== Battle ==
Some accounts say the engagement occurred September 18, but Caldwell's own report of the battle contradicts this. Knowing he was outnumbered, he ordered some of his militia to lure the Mexicans out of the fortified city and into the prairie around Salado Creek. The remaining Texians were positioned in the creek bed where they had good cover. Caldwell never anticipated victory but knew that from their protected position his men could cause considerable damage to the Mexicans without being too exposed to enemy fire. The Texians could find only thirty-eight horses fit for duty so only thirty-eight men could be sent to decoy the Mexicans. Captain John C. Hays, his fourteen Texas rangers, Henry E. McCulloch, William A. A. Wallace, Robert Addison Gillespie and sixteen others were assigned to the mission. The thirty-eight men were sent from the Salado to San Antonio on the morning of September 17, arriving outside the city sometime at dawn. Hays ordered his men to dismount and prepare an ambush while he and eight others proceeded to within a half-mile of Woll's base at the Alamo. Hays hoped to lure out around fifty of the Mexicans but, when the Texians were spotted, 200 Mexican cavalrymen and forty Cherokees were sent after them followed by about 300 more men led by Woll himself.

Hays ordered an immediate retreat back to the creek where a running battle ensued. The Mexican cavalry attempted to cut Hays' command off from the right but the Texians managed to get back to the Salado, closely pursued. Over 200 shots were fired during this first skirmish though the Texians sustained no casualties. When Hays reached camp the men were preparing for breakfast, which was quickly stopped so as to take up positions for defense. After seeing the Texian camp, the cavalry chose to break off the pursuit and form a line of battle on the opposite side of the creek, in the prairie southeast of Caldwell's men. When over 1,000 Mexicans and Cherokees were assembled, they began firing across the creek with volleys of musket and cannon fire. Though accurate, the artillery barrage was ineffective throughout the five-hour battle because of the distance at which they were being fired from. According to one Texian named N. B. Burkett, the Texians "did not pay a great deal of attention to them." Caldwell then sent for reinforcements from several nearby towns. His distress call said that he was surrounded, but was confident that he was in no threat of being defeated and could hold his position.

Another few sentences of Caldwell's message read: "The enemy are around me on every side, but I fear them not. I will hold my position until I hear from reinforcements. Come and help me—it is the most favorable opportunity I have ever seen. There are eleven hundred of the enemy. I can whip them on any ground, without any help, but can not take any prisoners. Why don't you come? Huzza! huzza for Texas!" The battle took the form of skirmishing for several hours as Caldwell directed his sharpshooters to constantly harass the Mexican line, then retreat back to the creek before being discovered. These tactics severely annoyed the Mexicans, who were dying left and right while inflicting only few casualties upon the Texians. Eventually General Woll ordered a full attack with his left and right wings, and so the Mexicans advanced; but they were repulsed within fifteen minutes. Some of the Mexicans made it to twenty steps from the Texian line before being killed. After this failed attack, Woll attempted to rally his men for another, but could not. Later that night, he retreated south toward the border. Woll managed to complete a successful withdrawal by igniting several camp fires to deceive the Texians as to their withdrawal. But when some of Caldwell's men attempted to skirmish with the Mexicans that night, they discovered that Woll had retreated. The battle was over.

== Aftermath ==
The battle at Salado Creek proved to be a decisive victory for the Texians; at least sixty Mexicans were reported as casualties while only one Texian was killed and nine others wounded. Caldwell pursued Woll's force after learning of the retreat and eventually caught up with them at the Hondo River where another battle was fought. In it, Captain Hays captured the enemy artillery but was repulsed soon after by an overwhelming Mexican force who then continued the retreat towards the Rio Grande.

During the time of the battle at Salado, another engagement occurred, this time in the form of a skirmish known as the Dawson massacre. Captain Nicholas Dawson was leading a force of fifty-three men on September 17 to reinforce Caldwell when he was attacked outside of San Antonio by several hundred Mexican cavalrymen and Cherokee Indians; after a skirmish the Texians began to surrender, and when they had been relieved of their weapons, the Mexicans opened fire again. Thirty-six of the fifty-three Texians were killed, two escaped the massacre and fifteen others were taken prisoner; of these seventeen men, only nine would survive. Caldwell's men found bodies of the Dawson party the next day on September 18, and buried them.

Their remains were later removed in 1848 to the Monument Hill Tomb with victims of the Black Bean Incident. Also, about 100 more Texians arrived that day to reinforce Caldwell's command, which eventually reached a strength of 500 men before the campaign was over.

== Citations ==
- Ramos, Raul A. (2008), Beyond the Alamo, forging Mexican ethnicity in San Antonio, 1821–1861, NC: The University of North Carolina Press, ISBN 978-0-8078-3207-3
