= Henry Karnes =

Texas Ranger

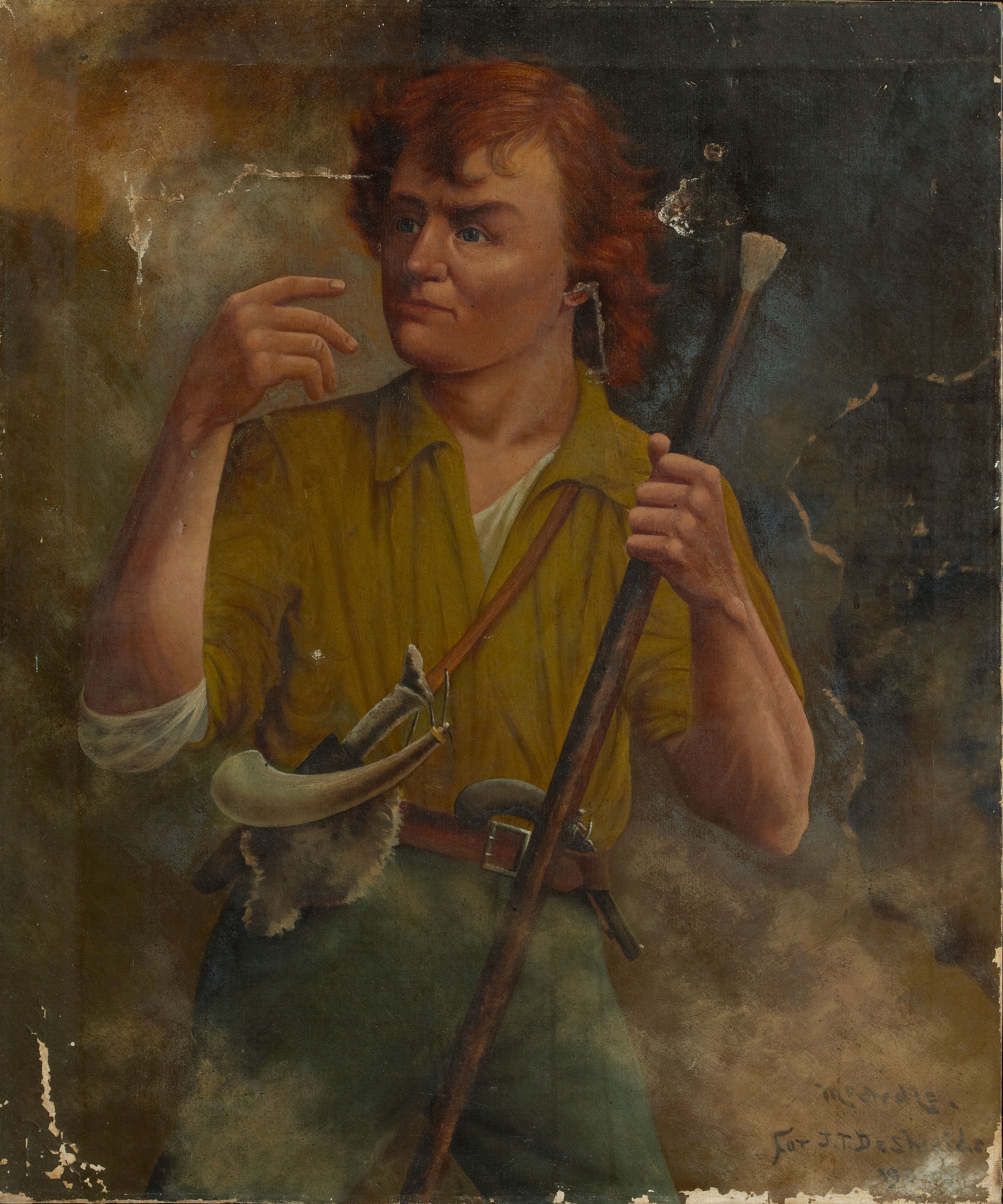
- Portrait by Henry Arthur McArdle, 1905.
- Born: September 8, 1812; Tennessee
- Died: August 16, 1840 (aged 27) San Antonio, Texas
- Allegiance: Republic of Texas
- Branch: Texas Army; Texas Rangers
- Rank: Colonel
- Conflicts: Texas Revolution; Battle of Concepción; Siege of Béxar; Battle of San Jacinto; Comanche Wars; Arroyo Seco Fight (WIA)

Henry Wax Karnes (September 8, 1812 – August 16, 1840) was notable as a soldier and figure of the Texas Revolution, as well as the commander of General Sam Houston's "Spy Squad" at the Battle of San Jacinto.

== Biography ==
Henry Wax Karnes, a native of Tennessee, first visited Texas in 1828. He returned to Texas during the Texas Revolution; he was one of Sam Houston's most important spies and worked closely with Deaf Smith. He fought with Smith, Seguín, and James Bowie in the battle of Concepción and then joined the siege of Bexar. While serving in a volunteer company, Karnes was sent with Smith to learn the fate of the Alamo. Henry Wax Karnes, along with Deaf Smith, was sent to learn the fate of the Alamo. They encountered Susanna Dickinson on her way to Gonzales, where she informed them of the fall of the Alamo12. Karnes and Smith then accompanied Dickinson to Gonzales, where she delivered the news to Sam Houston. By the time of the Battle of San Jacinto, he had become a captain and later was a colonel.

After the war, he served in the Texas Rangers. Karnes and Seguin teamed up as part of a campaign to calm the Comanche threat in Texas. He was wounded by an arrow in the Arroyo Seco Fight, an operation against the Comanches in August 1838. He died of yellow fever during 1840 in San Antonio, Texas.

Karnes was buried outside of Old Campo Santos Cemetery as he was a Protestant, and only Catholics were allowed to be buried there. This cemetery was later moved and Santa Rosa Hospital was built in its place across from Milam Park. A monument to Karnes was erected in the park in 1932, as this was the closest to his grave that the city knew of.

== Legacy ==
Both Karnes County and Karnes City, its county seat, are named after him.

There is a historical marker dedicated to Karnes located in San Antonio. He is also commemorated in the Texas Heroes Monument.

The SS Karnes, a Haskell-class attack transport acquired by the U.S. Navy for use in World War II, transported troops to and from battle areas in the Pacific. It was named after Henry.

== See also ==
- John Coker
- Young Perry Alsbury
- Battle of San Jacinto
- Deaf Smith
- Sam Houston
- Antonio López de Santa Anna
- Vicente Filisola
- José de Urrea
- Martín Perfecto de Cos
- Juan Almonte
- Timeline of the Texas Revolution
- Runaway Scrape
- Vince's Bridge
