= Pedro de Ampudia =

Mexican military officer and politician (1805-1868)

Pedro Ampudia y Grimarest
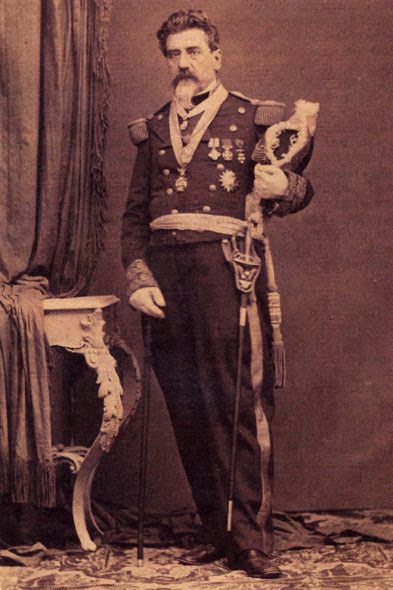

Secretary of War and Navy
- In office April 29, 1860 – September 20, 1860
- President: Benito Juárez
- Preceded by: José G. de Partearroyo
- Succeeded by: Ignacio de la Llave

Governor of Yucatán
- In office February 6, 1855 – November 24, 1855
- Preceded by: José Cárdenas del Llano
- Succeeded by: Santiago Méndez Ibarra

Governor of Nuevo León
- In office June 23, 1853 – October 22, 1854
- Preceded by: Juan Nepomuceno de la Garza y Evia
- Succeeded by: Mariano Moret
- In office September 1, 1846 – September 20, 1846
- Preceded by: Juan Nepomuceno de la Garza y Evia
- Succeeded by: Francisco de Padua Morales

Governor of Tabasco
- In office September 5, 1844 – January 2, 1845
- Preceded by: Narciso Santa María
- Succeeded by: Juan de Dios Salazar
- In office September 1, 1843 – June 30, 1844
- Preceded by: José Julián Dueñas
- Succeeded by: Narciso Santa María

Personal details
- Born: January 30, 1805 Havana, Captaincy General of Cuba, Viceroyalty of New Spain (now Havana, Cuba)
- Died: August 7, 1868 (aged 63) Mexico City, Mexico
- Resting place: Panteón de San Fernando
- Occupation: Military officer; politician

Military service
- Allegiance: Spain; Army of the Three Guarantees; Mexico
- Branch/service: Mexican Army
- Years of service: 1821–1868
- Rank: General
- Battles/wars: Mexican War of Independence; Spanish attempts to reconquer Mexico; Capitulation of San Juan de Ulúa; Texas Revolution; Siege of the Alamo; Battle of San Jacinto; Mexico–Texas Conflicts; Mier expedition; Battle of Mier; De Sentmanat's Tabasco expedition; Mexican–American War; Siege of Fort Texas; Battle of Palo Alto; Battle of Resaca de la Palma; Battle of Monterrey; Battle of Buena Vista; Battle of Cerro Gordo; Reform War; Second Franco–Mexican War

Pedro Nolasco Martín José María de la Candelaria Francisco Javier Ampudia y Grimarest (January 30, 1805 – August 7, 1868) was a Cuban-born Mexican general and politician who served prominently in the Mexican Army during the 19th century. Participating in key conflicts, including the Texas Revolution, the Mexican–American War and the Second Franco–Mexican War.

Beyond his military engagements, he held significant administrative and political positions, including governorship of multiple of Mexico's federal entities and a brief term as Secretary of National Defense under President Benito Juárez amidst a complex civil war.

== Early life and military career ==
Born in Havana, Cuba, then a part of the Spanish Empire, he began his career in the Spanish army before emigrating to Mexico at the age of 16, shortly before the end of the Mexican War of Independence. He arrived in Veracruz as a lieutenant in the entourage of the last viceroy of New Spain, Juan O'Donojú, before joining the Army of The Three Guarantess in support of Mexican independence.

After Mexico gained independence, he rose through ranks as an artillery officer and fought off the remaining Spanish forces at the San Juan de Ulúa Fortress.

== Texas Revolution and border conflicts ==
In 1836, during the Texas Revolution, Ampudia served as commander of the Mexican artillery at the Siege of the Alamo and later saw heavy combat at the Battle of San Jacinto. In early 1840's, amid ongoing border tensions with the Republic of Texas, Ampudia commanded the 350-man garrison of Ciudad Mier which was attacked on December 26, 1842, by Texan militia. In a bloody two-day battle, the Mexican army took 243 Texans as prisoner.

The captured Texans were sentenced to execution, but Ampudia had the execution decree reversed and order the prisoners be marched toward Mexico City instead. Before the orders could be carried out, 181 Texans escaped but, the lack of supplies in the mountainous Mexican desert resulted in 176 of them surrendering or being recaptured. The prisoners were later subjected to the Black Bean Episode, earning Ampudia the grudging respect of the Texans across the border, but also a reputation for severity.

== Tabasco governorship ==
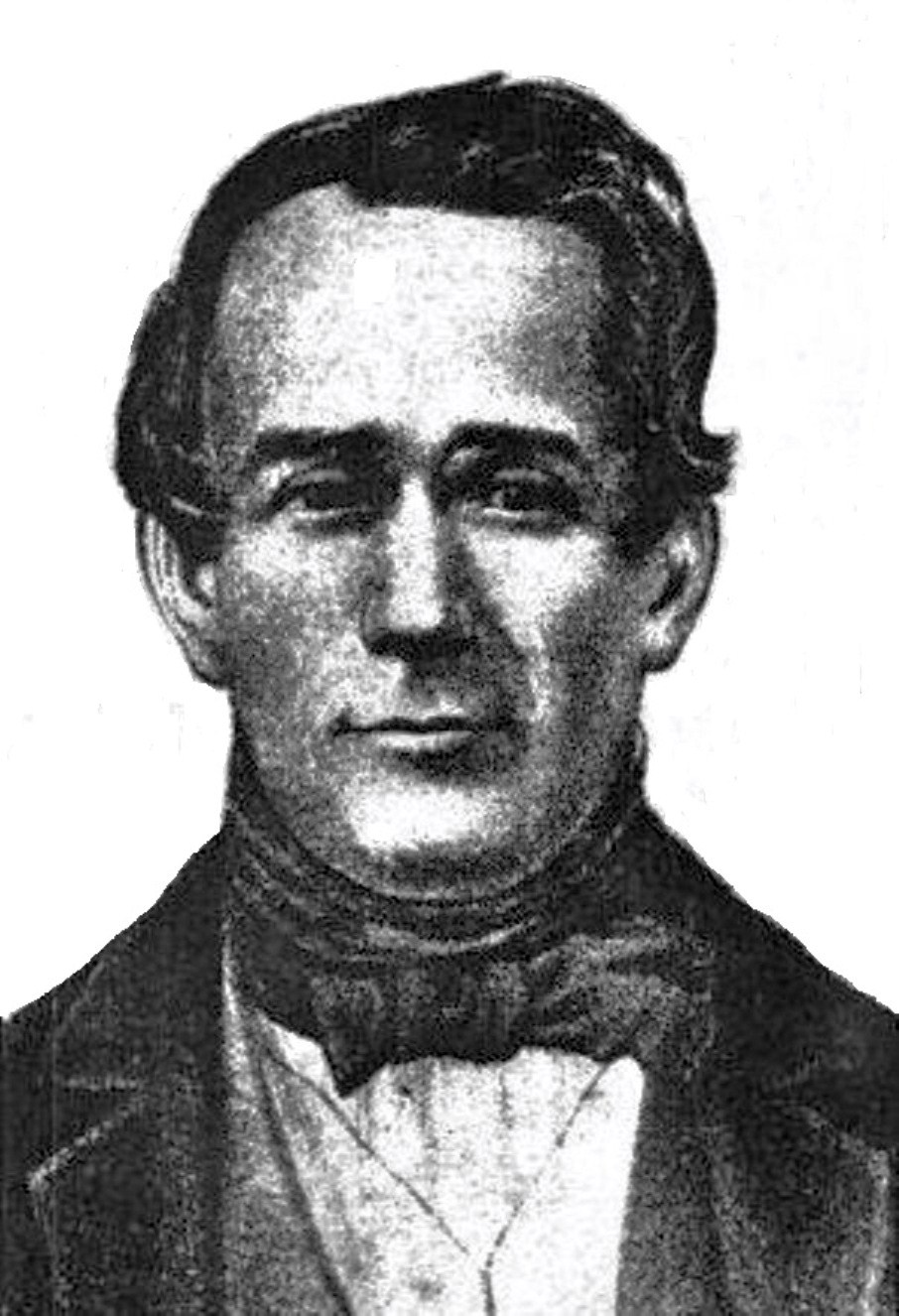
Francisco de Sentmanat, governor of Tabasco deposed by Ampudia

By mid-1843, as federal-centralist tensions and armed rebellions increase after conservatives repealed the federalist constitution of 1824 and installed a unitary political regime. Ampudia arrived in Tabasco following military campaigns in Yucatán. The governor at the time, fellow Cuba native, Francisco de Sentmanat denied Ampudia's forces entry into the state, citing concerns over disease and a local pact of non-aggression with Yucatán.

On orders from President Antonio López de Santa Anna, Ampudia's forces bombarded and capture the capital, San Juan Bautista on July 11, 1843. Sentmanat fled and Ampudia assumed control, initially as interim governor, before being appointed constitutional governor.

Determined to regain power, Sentmanat organized a fillibuster expedition in 1844, recruiting mercenaries from New Orleans. Arriving with two vessels at the port of Chiltepec. Ampudia himself lead his forces defeating Sentmanat near Jalapa on June 10, capturing several of his men; a few days later, Sentmanat was captured by government troops under the command of Colonel Laureano González. He was taken to the town of Jalpa for a meeting with Ampudia, where they exchanged polite greetings. After being court-martialed, he was executed by firing squad on June 12, 1844, along with other foreign members of his expedition.

== Mexican–American War ==
In 1846, during rising tension with the United States, Ampudia briefly assumed the governorship and military command of Nuevo León, before being appointed commander-in-chief of the Ejército del Norte (Army of the North) and parting to Matamoros, where he exchange correspondence with Zachary Taylor demanding the withdrawal of his forces to the Nueces River and off disputed territory.

He was soon succeeded by General Mariano Arista and fought as a subordinate at the Siege of Fort Texas, the Battle of Palo Alto and the Battle of Resaca de la Palma, where he criticized Arista's tactics. During the subsequent retreat south he regained overall command of the division in time for the Battle of Monterrey. Despite orders from Antonio López de Santa Anna that he was to retreat to Saltillo, Ampudia chose to stand at Monterrey instead and informed Santa Anna that:

"The men will brook no further retreat in the face of the enemy."

In September, 1846, Ampudia began preparing defenses at Monterrey, capital city of Nuevo León, with approximately 7,000 men. Taylor's forces numbering on around 6,000 men began attacking on September 21 and after intense urban street by street fighting and in spite of a skilled defense, Ampudia found American forces had entered from the west and east. Trapped in the city plaza and bombarded by U.S. forces with howitzers, Ampudia chose to request a flag of truce and retreat his battered army. His arrangement with Taylor allowed the Ejército del Norte to keep its weapons, but they were to march as far south as possible and neglect offensive operations for three months.

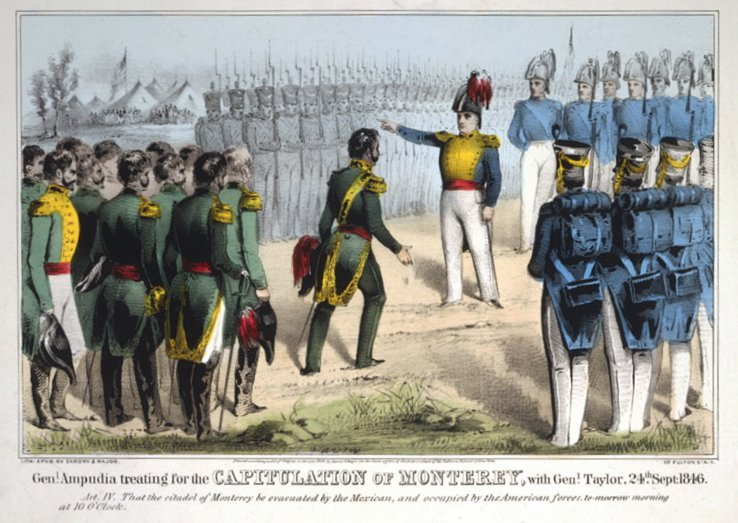
General Ampudia treating for the capitulation of Monterrey with General Taylor 24th Sept. 1846

By September 25, Ampudia and his forces marched out of the city with its artillery, weapons, and supplies to the beat of drums and with their flags raised, saluted by the U.S. Army with full military honors.

After the Capitulation of Monterrey, he justified his decision to his superiors on the grounds that he was preserving military honor of his army; he also added the practical consideration that he was keeping his forces intact so they could fight again in other battles.

His failure to defend that city led to his removal by Santa Anna, and like his former superior, Arista, Ampudia found himself spending most of the rest of the war in administrative duties, though he was in command of portions of the Mexican artillery at the Battle of Buena Vista and at the Battle of Cerro Gordo.Despite his controversial retreat at Monterrey, Ampudia remained popular in Mexican folklore as "the only man who could defeat Taylor."

== Later career ==
After the Mexican–American War, Ampudia remained active in the military and in politics, serving two terms as governor of Nuevo León. in 1855 he was appointed governor and military commandant of Yucatán by President Santa Anna during the Revolution of Ayutla aimed at overtrowing the latter's increasingly conservative and authoritarian government, however, Ampudia's policies had gradually become more liberal and he adhere to the Plan of Ayutla. After the revolutionaries victory, he served as a deputy for Yucatán in Constituent Congress of Mexico that in 1857 promulgated a new constitution.

He remained a supporter of Benito Juárez's liberal government during the Reform War, briefly serving as Secretary of Navy and War. During the Second French intervention in Mexico he served as commander of the liberal Army of the East, in whose command he was gravely wounded. In 1868, Ampudia died (possibly from complications arising from his wartime injuries) and was buried in the Panteón de San Fernando.

== See also ==
- Cuban Mexicans
- Battle of Monterrey
- History of Mexico
- History of Nuevo León
- Mexican–American War
