= Seco Creek =

Stream in Frio County, Texas

- Etymology: Spanish
- Native name: Rio Seco (Spanish)

Location
- Country: United States
- State: Texas
- Region: Bandera County, Uvalde County, Frio County, and Medina County

Physical characteristics
- Source: source
  - location: five miles north of Sentry Mountain and FM 470, southwestern Bandera County, Texas
  - coordinates: 29°44′05″N 99°25′14″W
  - elevation: 2,050 ft (620 m)
- Mouth: mouth
  - location: confluence with Hondo Creek, seven miles west of Moore, Frio County, Texas
  - coordinates: 29°01′38″N 99°08′24″W
  - elevation: 571 ft (174 m)
- Length: 66 mi (106 km)

Basin features
- River system: Hondo Creek, Frio River, Nueces River

Seco Creek, is a tributary stream of Hondo Creek, traversing Bandera County, Uvalde County, Frio County, and Medina County, Texas. It was named Río Seco (Spanish for "dry river") in 1689 by Captain Alonso De León, governor of Coahuila, when his expedition crossed the creek.

Seco Creek has its source five miles north of Sentry Mountain and Farm to Market Road 470 in southwestern Bandera County. Its course runs southeast for sixty-six miles until its mouth at the confluence with Hondo Creek, seven miles west of Moore in Frio County.

== History ==
Seco Creek was a watering place for travelers on the San Antonio-El Paso Road including the stagecoach lines like the San Antonio-El Paso Mail and San Antonio-San Diego Mail Line.

== See also ==
- List of rivers of Texas
