= Wallace Creek =

Stream in Texas

Coordinates: 29°51′16″N 99°16′46″W

Location
- Counties: United States
- State: Texas

Physical characteristics
- Mouth
  - location: Texas, U.S.

Wallace Creek is a stream in Bandera County, Texas and Kerr County, Texas, in the United States.

Wallace Creek was named in the 1850s for Bigfoot Wallace, who owned land near there.

== See also ==
- List of rivers of Texas
