= Alexander Somervell =

Republic of Texas soldier (1796–1854)

Alexander Somervell (1796 – 1854) was a Texian soldier, and leader of the Somervell Expedition. He had previously participated in the Battle of San Jacinto as a lieutenant colonel of the first regiment of Texas Volunteers.

Somervell County in Texas is named for Somervell.
