= Perote, Veracruz =

Perote
- City and municipality
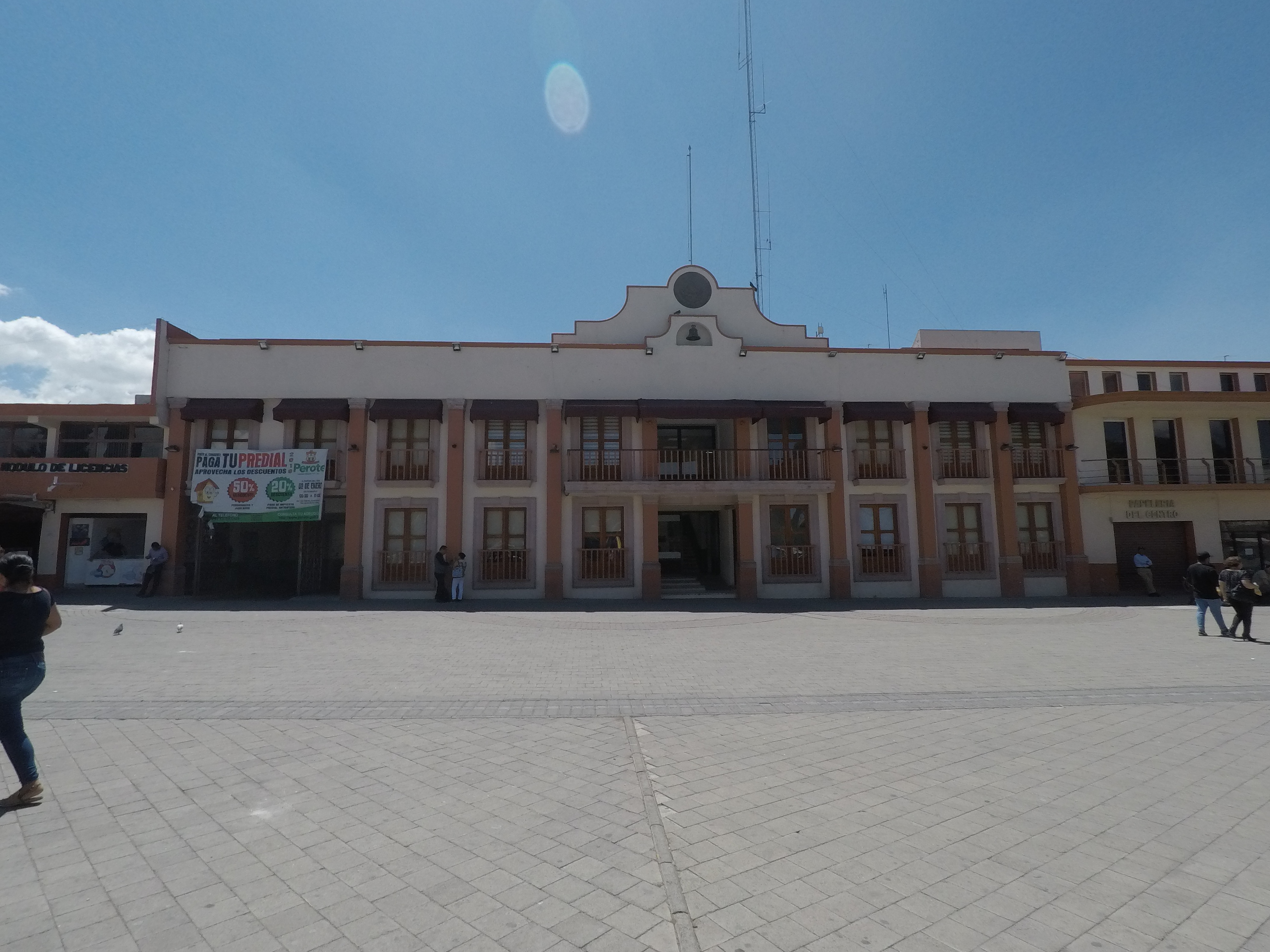
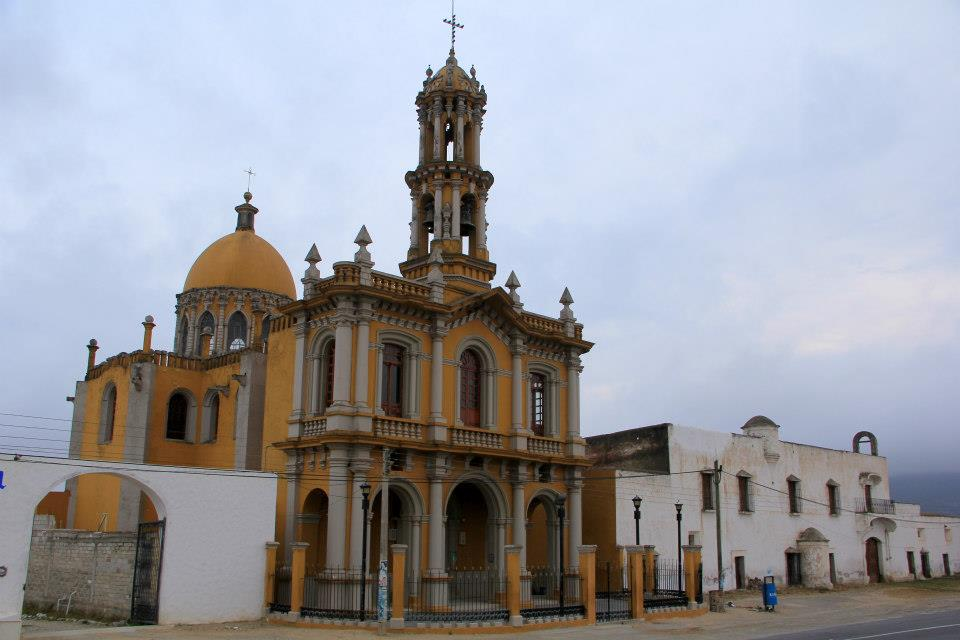
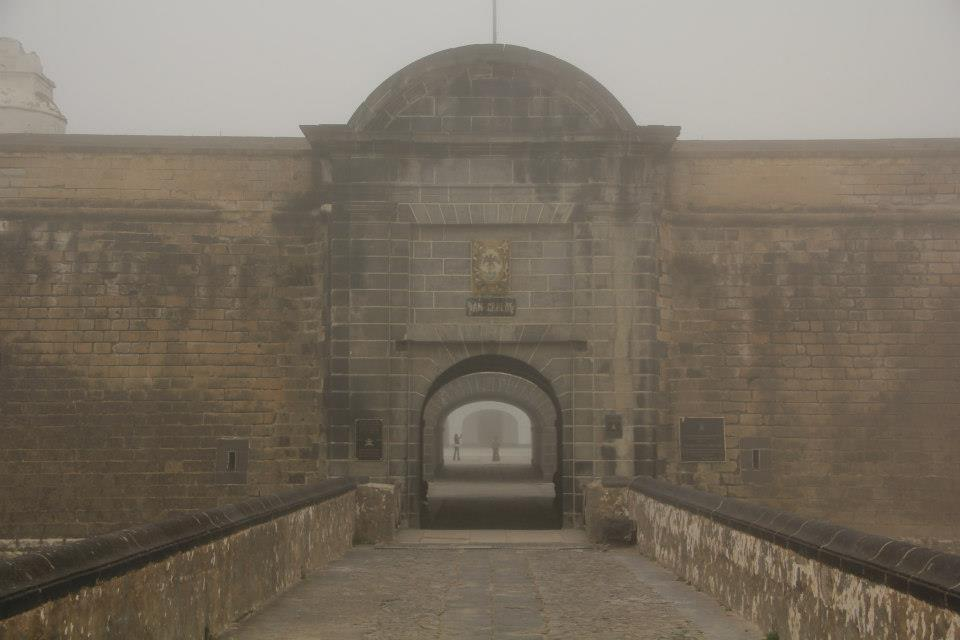
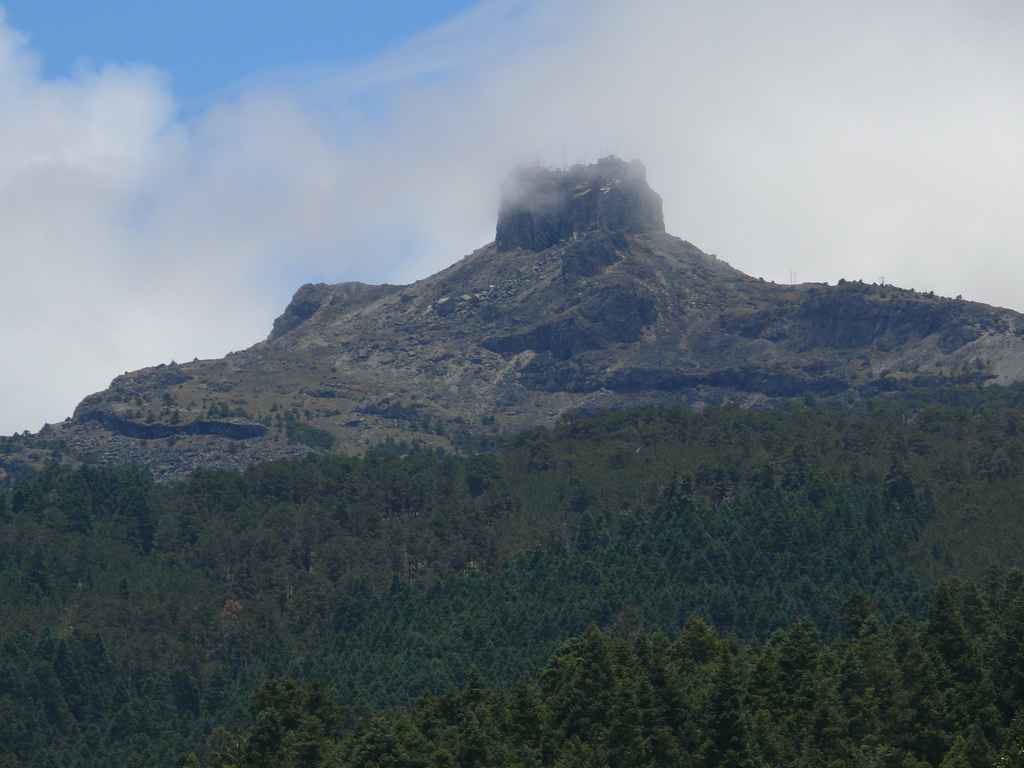
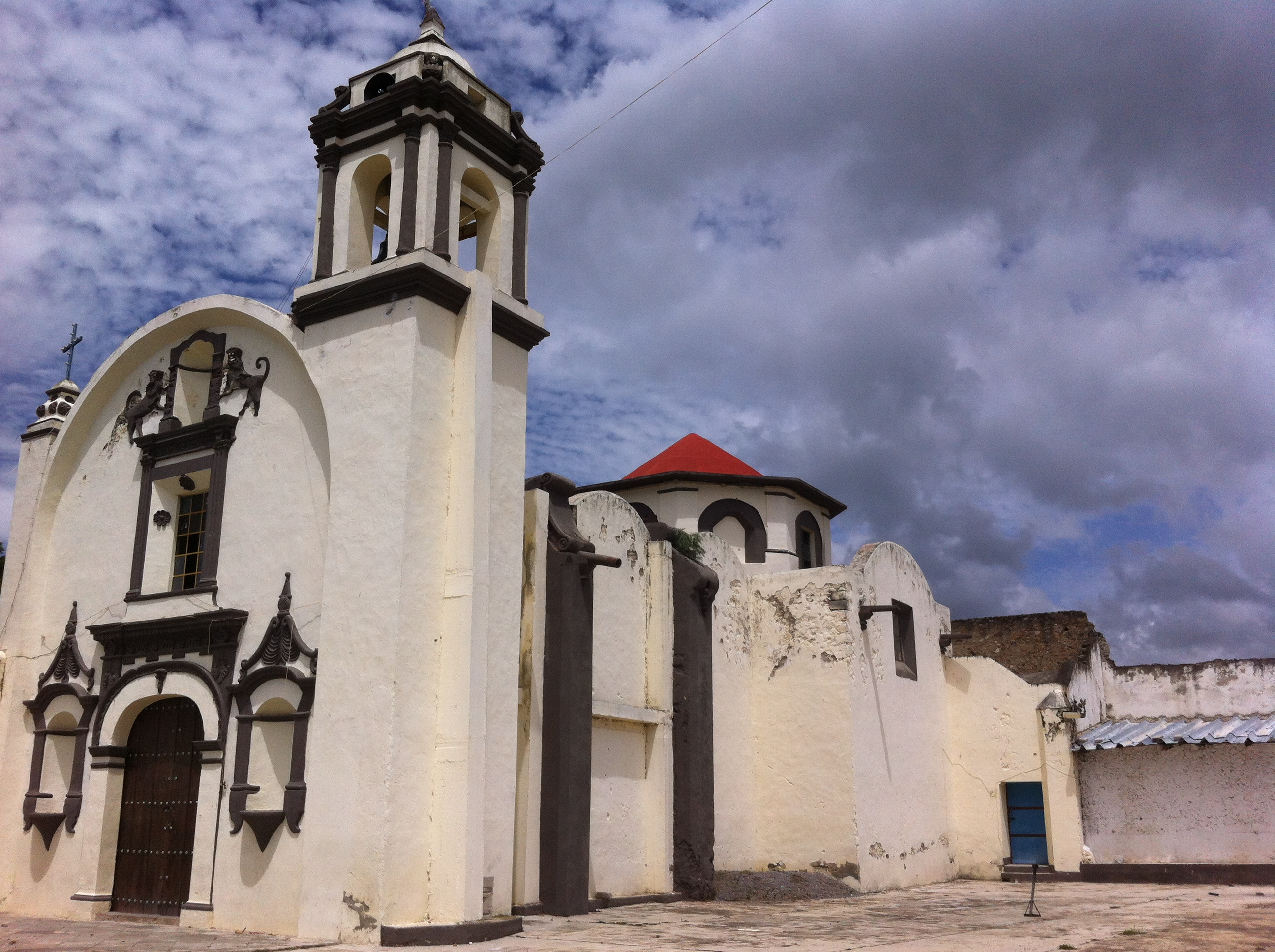
- Top: Perote Municipal Hall; Middle: San Antonio Limón Church, San Carlos Fortress; Bottom: Cofre de Perote, Calvario Church

- Coat of arms

- Location in Mexico Perote (Mexico)
- Coordinates: 19°33′43″N 97°14′31″W
- Country: Mexico
- State: Veracruz
- Region: Capital Region
- Foundation: 1525 (Pedro Anzures)

Government
  - Mayor: Delfino Ortega Martínez (PRI)

Area
  - Municipality: 614.7 km^{2} (237.3 sq mi)
- Elevation (of seat): 2,425 m (7,956 ft)

Population (2020)
  - Municipality: 77,432
  - Seat: 42,451
- Time zone: UTC-6 (Central (US Central))
- Postal code (of seat): 30128
- Climate: ET
- Website: (in Spanish)

Historical population
Year	Pop.	±%
1995	51,688	—
2000	54,365	+5.2%
2005	61,272	+12.7%
2010	68,982	+12.6%
2015	72,795	+5.5%
2020	77,432	+6.4%

Perote is a city and municipality in the Mexican state of Veracruz. The city serves as the seat of government for the surrounding municipality of the same name, with a population 42,451 inhabitants as of 2020, while the municipality population is of 77,432. Perote borders the municipalitys of Las Vigas de Ramírez, Acajete, Xico and Tlalnelhuayocan, and the state of Puebla. It is on Federal Highway 140.

Its climate is cold and dry with an annual average temperature of 12 degrees Celsius.

Perote's fortress of San Carlos once served as a prison. Guadalupe Victoria died there.

Also in Perote is the Cofre de Perote shield-shaped volcano (the Nahuatl name of which was "Naucampatepetl," which means "four times lord").

This town is the home of a sizable Spanish community which immigrated here in the 1930s. Because of this, it is known for Spanish-style cured meats and sausage such as jamón serrano (serrano ham), botifarra (Catalán sausage), and Spanish chorizo sausage.
