= Monument Hill and Kreische Brewery State Historic Sites =

- Kreische, Henry L., Brewery and House
- U.S. National Register of Historic Places
- Texas State Historic Site
- Texas State Antiquities Landmark
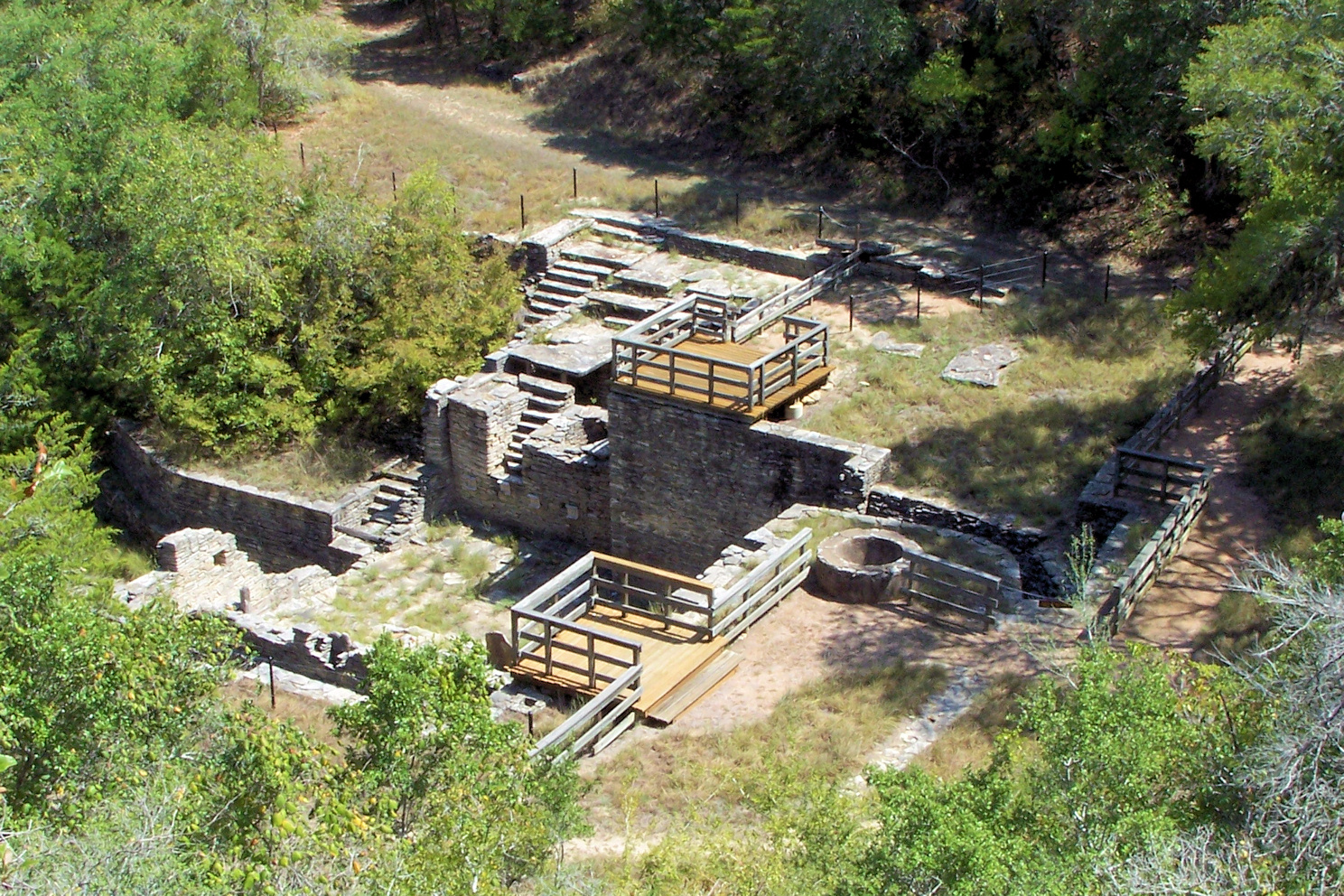
- The ruins of the Kreische Brewery. Decks were added for the interpretive tours.

- Location within Texas Location within the United States
- Location: S of La Grange off US 77 on Monument Hill, La Grange, Texas
- Coordinates: 29°53′20″N 96°52′18″W
- Area: 7 acres (2.8 ha)
- Built: 1836
- Built by: Henry Ludwig Kreische
- Architectural style: German Colonial
- NRHP reference No.: 75001974
- TSAL No.: 8200000256

Significant dates
- Added to NRHP: April 16, 1975
- Designated TSHS: 1977
- Designated TSAL: June 28, 1983

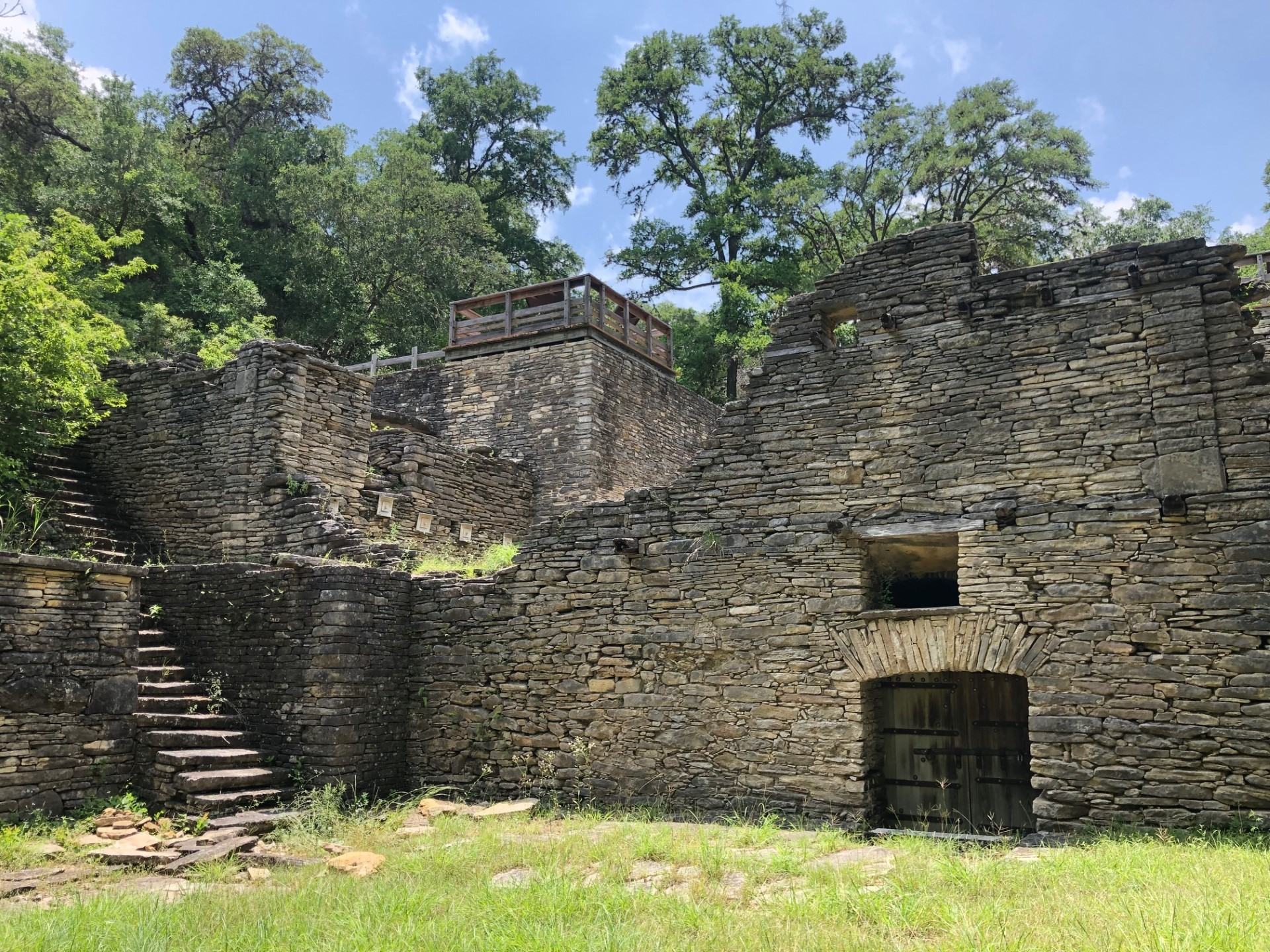
The ruins of the historic brewery, built in the late 1860s.

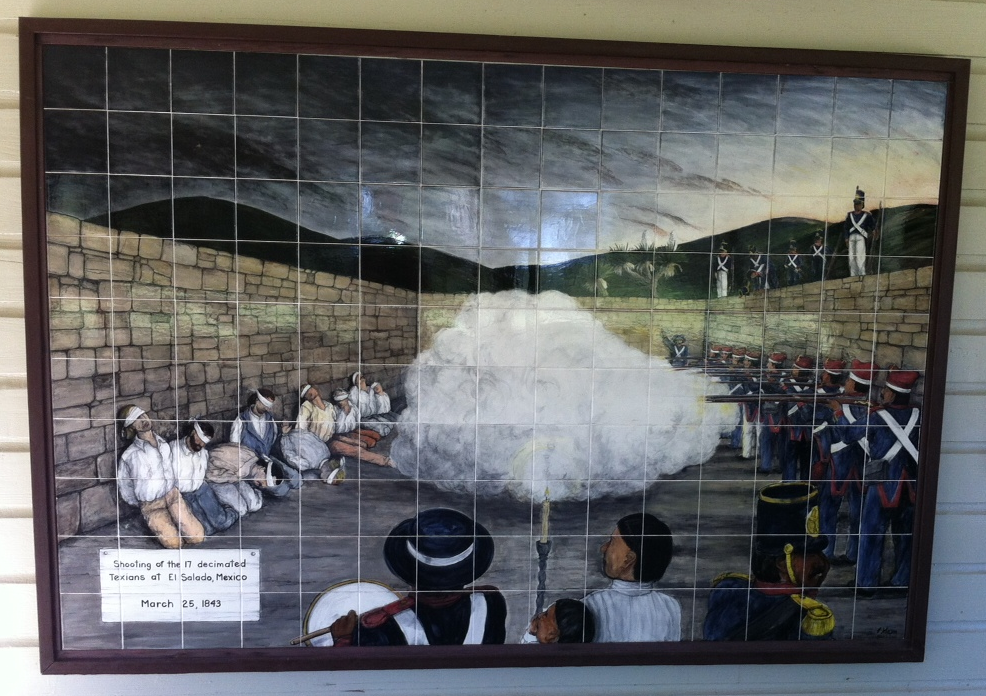
Depiction of the firing-squad execution of 17 Texan prisoners, 25 March 1843 in Mexico, three months after the Battle of Mier.

Monument Hill and Kreische Brewery State Historic Sites are two adjacent state historic sites managed by the Texas Historical Commission. They are located at 29.888° -96.876°, just off U.S. Route 77, south of La Grange, Texas. The sites sit on a sandstone bluff 200 feet above the Colorado River. Monument Hill is a memorial to the men who died in the Dawson Massacre and in the Black Bean Episode of the ill-fated Mier Expedition.

Kreische Brewery’s ruins are a relic to the golden age of Texas craft brewing and represents the contribution of German immigrants to the unique culture of the state. German immigrant, stonemason and brewer Heinrich Kreische, owned 172 ¼ acres of land on the bluff. He built his house and the brewery in the 1850s and 1860s, and operated the brewery until his death in 1882. The Kreische Brewery and house were listed in the National Register of Historic Places on April 16, 1975.

== History ==
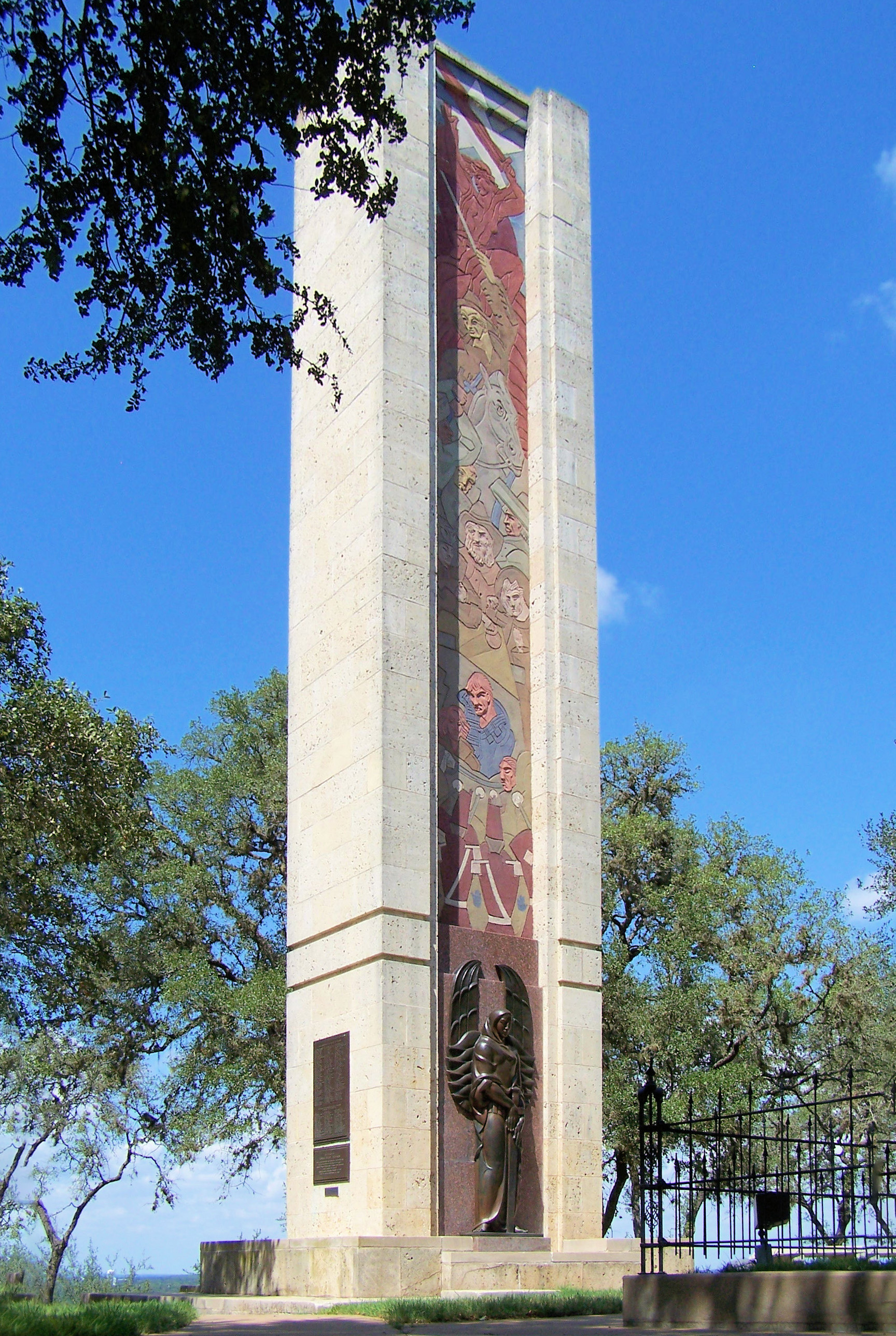
The monument of the fallen men of the Dawson Massacre and the ill-fated Mier Expedition.

On September 18, 1848, the remains of Texans killed in the Dawson Massacre and the Black Bean Episode, which had been retrieved from their original burial sites, were reinterred in a common tomb with a sandstone vault at the location now known as Monument Hill. A committee that included Black Bean survivor N.W. Faison chose the location in the summer of 1848. According to newspaper reports, the location was “preferable to any other in the surrounding country; it is a commanding position, and can be seen at a great distance, and will not fail to attract the attention of everyone who passes through the country.” More than 1,000 people from all over the state attended the ceremony. Recent German immigrant and stonemason, Heinrich Ludwig Kreische of La Grange, was chosen to build the limestone tomb using resources quarried from the bottom of the bluff.

=== Kreische Brewery ===
On January 17, 1849, Heinrich Ludwig Kreische purchased 172 ¼ acres (70 ha) of land on the bluff, which included the tomb. Trained as a master stonemason, he built a three-story German-Texan style house on the property and, in the late 1860s, began building a brewery. The brewery was in full operation by the 1870s, and by 1878 it had become the third largest brewing operation in Texas, with 774 barrels recorded and distributed around the local area. The brewery’s flagship product was "Kreische Bluff Beer.”

The Kreische family were well-respected members of the German community. The family leased a small portion of the land near the bluff edge to the local Bluff Scheutzenverein, or marksmanship society, for gatherings, competitions, and celebrations. Heinrich also owned and operated the Union Beer Hall in downtown La Grange, where his customers could enjoy a glass of Bluff Beer along with national favorites such as Anheuser-Busch.

Rapid industrialization, the rise of railroads, and the progression of commercial refrigeration challenged local and small-scale brewing in the late 1800s, and by the 1880s, Kreische’s brewing business began to decline. In addition to owning and operating his brewery, Kreische continued to work on stonemasonry projects in the area, including the construction of an icehouse in downtown La Grange.

Kreische’s untimely death in 1882 was likely the final blow to the brewery—ultimately it shut down in 1884. For two years, Kreische’s family continued the business, but without Kreische’s leadership and the decline of small breweries, the business failed, and the building was abandoned. In subsequent years, the decaying brewery structure became a prominent picnic spot and attraction for adventuring couples and families. The only historic pictures of the brewery are from these sightseers in the early 1900s.

=== Tomb and monument ===
Kreische maintained the tomb of the Dawson and Mier men for the remainder of his life, but the tomb and Kreische Brewery began to deteriorate after his death in 1882. The Kreische family continued to live in their house on the bluff until the youngest daughter Julia Kreische’s death in 1952. Throughout those years, Kreische’s heirs made several requests to have the tomb removed from their property, as it was frequently vandalized.

On September 18, 1933, a new granite vault was dedicated, For the 1936 Texas Centennial, the Texas Centennial Commission erected a 48-foot (15 m) shellstone monument with an art deco mural to prominently mark the mass grave. In 1949 the Board of Control transferred the site to the Texas Parks and Wildlife Department. The Mier Expedition and Dawson’s Men Monument and Tomb was listed in the National Register of Historic Places on March 6, 2019.

=== Evolution of the Historic Sites ===
Upon Julia Kreische’s death in 1952, the remaining land outside of the .36 owned by the state was willed to the Hostyn Catholic Church, a local parish which Julia supported. The state conducted archeological investigations and stabilization efforts to preserve the history of the Kreische family in the late 1970s and early 1980s. The complete site opened to the public in 1986, after archaeological studies were completed.

By 1989 TPWD operated the two sites jointly. In 2019, the Texas state legislature transferred Kreische Brewery and Monument Hill State Historic Sites from TPWD to the Texas Historical Commission, the state agency for historic preservation.

== Natural history ==
The bluff at Monument Hill is the northern limit of the Oakville Escarpment of Miocene era bearing sandstone. This escarpment or "cuesta" marks the boundary between the Upland Post Oak Woodlands and the Fayette Prairie environments. The erosion of this sandstone cap has created pockets of alkaline soil. This alkaline soil is favored by several species of plants and animals normally found in, or even endemic to the Texas Hill Country, 70 miles northwest. These species were transported to Monument Hill by the Colorado River, creating an isolated colony of western species that coexist with eastern woodland and prairie communities.

== See also ==
- List of Texas State Historic Sites
- National Register of Historic Places listings in Fayette County, Texas
- Recorded Texas Historic Landmarks in Fayette County
