= San Carlos Fortress =

18th–century fortress in Mexico

Coordinates: 19.5735°N 97.2446°W

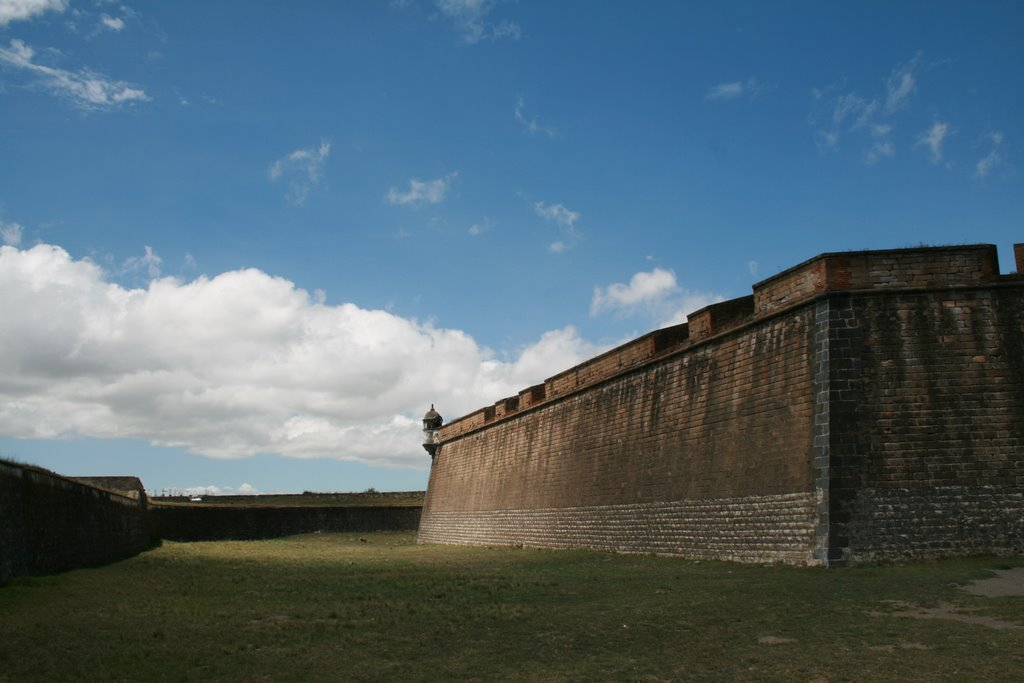
San Carlos Fortress

The San Carlos Fortress (in Spanish: Fortaleza de San Carlos) is an 18th-century fortress in the city of Perote, in the Mexican state of Veracruz. It is also known as the Fort of San Carlos, Perote Castle, the Castle of San Carlos, Perote Prison, San Carlos de Perote Fortress, and San Carlos de Perote Castle.

The fortress was built from 1770 to 1776 by Manuel de Santisteban as a guard post and repository for treasure prior to shipment to Spain. After the Mexican War of Independence, the remaining Spanish colonial troops were garrisoned in the neighboring castle of San Juan de Ulúa, prompting General Guadalupe Victoria to create, on 11 October 1823, the first military college in the new country: the Perote Military College.

Between 1841 and 1844, soldiers from the Republic of Texas, survivors of the Texan Santa Fe Expedition, the Dawson Massacre, and the Mier Expedition, were imprisoned here. 300 or so members of the failed Santa Fe expedition were held in the fortress during the winter of 1841–42. Then in December 1842, about fifty men who had been captured in San Antonio by General Adrián Woll, including fifteen from Dawson's company, were confined. The following year, approximately 160 survivors of the 1842–43 Mier Expedition, an offshoot of the Somervell Expedition, after being used through the summer as laborers to work on roads near Mexico City, were taken to the Perote Prison in September 1843. The last of all these Texan prisoners, numbering by then about 105, were not released until a year later, in September 1844. Many had died from wounds, disease, or starvation; and several prisoners had managed to escape, or were released earlier in response to U.S. diplomatic efforts.)

In March 1843, Guadalupe Victoria, who had served as Mexico's first President in the 1820s, died in the San Carlos Fortress complex. He suffered from epilepsy and was receiving medical treatment in Perote.

During the Mexican–American War of 1846–48, American forces captured the fortress on April 22, 1847. They garrisoned it as a post to protect their line of communications between Veracruz and Mexico City from guerrillas.

At the very end of the Second World War, after Mexico declared war against the Axis alliance, the facility served as a prison for German and Italian citizens.

Then the fortress became a state prison, from 1949 to March 2007, after which it was opened to the public.
