= Hondo Creek =

Location
- Country: United States
- State: Texas

Physical characteristics
- Source: Texas Hill Country
  - location: Medina County, Texas
  - coordinates: 29°42′58″N 99°23′16″W
  - elevation: 577 m (1,893 ft)
- Mouth: Frio River
  - location: Frio County, Texas
  - coordinates: 28°56′37″N 99°10′44″W
  - elevation: 182 m (597 ft)

Hondo Creek is a tributary of the Frio River in Texas that rises in Bandera County northwest of Tarpley and runs approximately 67 miles to its mouth near Pearsall, Texas. The creek crosses through three counties including Bandera, Medina, and Frio.

== Course ==
Hondo (Spanish for deep) Creek begins in the Texas Hill Country. The initially broken waters of the stream travels through limestone benches and steep slopes until the land flattens near Tarpley. This section of the creek is generally shallow with a bottom of clay loam, which serves as a habitat for Ashe juniper and live oak woods. As it runs south, the creek grows in depth in the surrounding rolling plain, and a mixture of clay with a large concentration of sand is found in its bed. As the tributary approaches its mouth, the environment changes to fertile crop lands with Mesquite trees growing along its bank.

== History ==
=== Battle of the Arroyo Hondo ===
Battle of the Arroyo Hondo
- Part of Woll Expedition
Date	September 21, 1842
Location	Hondo Creek, Texas
Result	Texan victory; Strategic withdrawal

Belligerents
Republic of Texas	Mexico

Commanders and leaders
Mathew Caldwell	Adrián Woll

Casualties and losses
Unknown	Unknown

Hondo Creek where it meets Quihi Creek was the site of the Battle of the Arroyo Hondo in 1842. The battle occurred following the third in a series of three invasions by Mexican forces in 1842 to reclaim territory lost during the 1836 Texas Revolution. After the 1200-man Mexican army was defeated in San Antonio by Mathew Caldwell and 200 gathered Texans, the forces of Mexican General Adrián Woll headed west. On September 21, they met up with a few Texas Rangers, who were part of the Texas forces, Under the command of John Coffee Hays, known as "Captain Yak" by the Indians, the Rangers attacked on the banks of the creek, and a battle ensued. Four Rangers were wounded including Samuel Luckie. The Rangers captured a cannon battery but had to abandon it, as the Texas Army did not advance to their position.

Although accounts of the battle vary, the Texans had fared well. Caldwell believed that his men could overtake the Mexican Army. However, the Texas forces were outnumbered, under-provisioned, and facing fierce cannon fire; they lacked a consensus, and the leaders were unable to rally unanimity for an offensive action.

Following the battle, the Texans disbanded and the Mexican forces continued their trek southwestward, back to Mexico. A historical marker can now be found in Medina County where the battle is believed to have taken place.

=== Cow Camp Massacre ===
Also marked along the stream in Medina County, near Tarpley, is the Cow Camp Massacre. This is the site of a January 27, 1866, Native American attack that occurred as three minors (aged 12–19) set up camp along Hondo Creek to recover lost livestock. Eight Lipan Apaches followed one of the boys to the camp. He and another were captured, but one escaped. Of the two captured, one was never seen again and the other's mutilated body was found several days later.

Cow Camp Masacre
- Part of Texas-Indian Wars
- Location: Near Tarpley, Texas
- Date: January 27, 1866
- Target: Three young men recovering livestock
- Attack type: Massacre
- Deaths: 2
- Victims: August Rothe, George Miller, Hubert Weynand
- Perpetrator: Lipan Apache
- No. of participants: 8
- Defender: August Rothe managed to escape

== Fishing ==
According to Texas Parks and Wildlife, the following fish have been caught in the tributary (records in parentheses):

- Largemouth bass (22 inch length, 4.31 lbs.)
- Rio Grande cichlid (10 inch length, 1.38 lbs.)
- Gray redhorse (17.25 inch length, 1.50 lbs.)
- Redear sunfish (10.75 inch length, 1.13 lbs.)

== See also ==
- List of rivers of Texas
- Salado Creek, another 1842 battle site
