= Salado Creek =

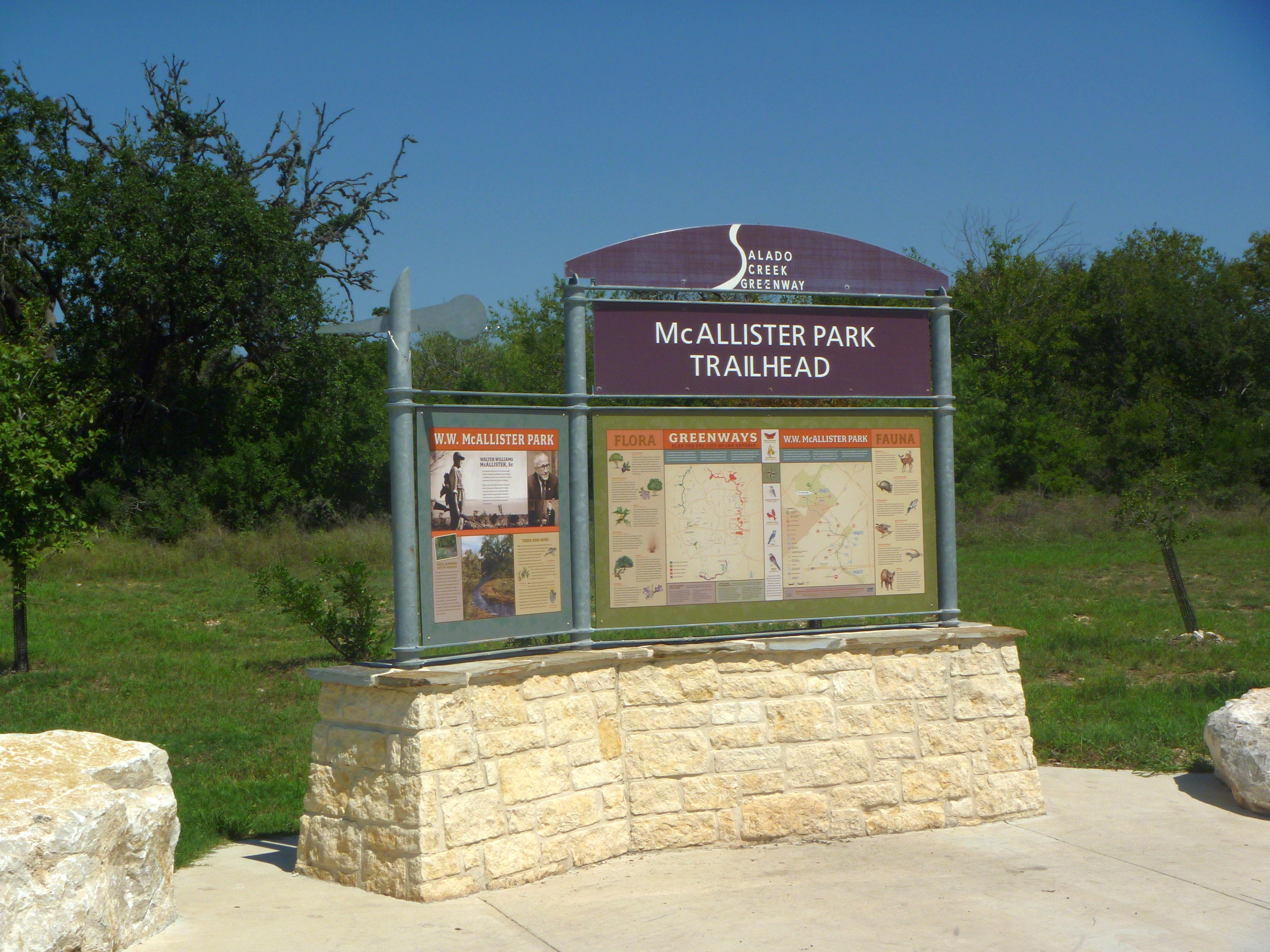

Location
- Country: United States

Physical characteristics
- Source
  - location: Recycled water
- Mouth
  - location: San Antonio River
  - coordinates: 29°16′56″N 98°26′05″W
- Length: 38 miles (61 km)

Salado Creek (/səˈlɑːdoʊ/ sə-LAH-doh) is a waterway in San Antonio that runs from northern Bexar County for about 38 miles (61 km) to the San Antonio River near Buena Vista.

== Watershed ==
In 1992, a well was plugged in Fort Sam Houston that had been used for irrigation for farmers. The well had maintained the ecosystem of the creek since a decline in the number of springs that had fed it. In 1995, plans to revitalize the creek began. Groups such as the Salado Creek Foundation began work to restore the historic significance of the creek as a link of Northern Bexar County to the missions in the South. The creek was affected by the Floods of 1998 causing property damage and unconstructive erosion to the creek bed. In March 2001, the San Antonio Water System's Salado Creek WRC began using recycled water to help the creek flow regularly for the first time in almost ten years.

== History ==
The creek was given its name in 1716 by Spanish explorer Domingo Ramón. It has been the site of two battles in Texas history, including the 1813 Battle of Rosillo and the 1842 Battle of Salado Creek following the Texas Revolution.

The Battle of Rosillo Creek (called the Battle of Salado Creek at the time) started as a siege of Presidio La Bahía from November 7, 1812, to February 19, 1813, for the purpose of trying to recapture the fort after the Republican Army of the North under Bernardo Gutiérrez de Lara and Samuel Kemper, numbered at 600 to 900 men, had taken over. The Spanish Royal Army of Texas, under Governor Manuel María de Salcedo and Nuevo León Governor Simón de Herrera, had retreated to San Antonio. In March 1813, the Spanish army, numbering 950 to 1,500, had planned an ambush on the republicans as they marched and searched for food along the creek banks. The republicans caught sight of the royal forces first and routed them within an hour, killing between 100 and 330 soldiers and capturing most of their arms and ammunition, six cannons, and 1,500 horses and mules, at the expense of only six men.

After the battle, the Spanish army retreated to San Antonio, signed a truce with Kemper on April 1, and surrendered Salcedo and Herrera. On April 3, Salcedo, Herrera, and 12 prisoners of war were executed by a vengeful Mexican soldier (Capt. Antonio Delgado), near the site of the battle. On April 6, 1813, the first Declaration of Independence and Constitution for Texas were drafted and Gutiérrez was named president, establishing the first Republic of Texas. The new republic was destroyed four months later, at the fateful Battle of Medina.

A later Battle of Salado Creek (1842) was fought between the volunteers of the Texas Republic and the Mexican forces of Brig. General and French Mexican soldier Adrián Woll. The conflict began following Brig. General Ráfael Vásquez's incursion into San Antonio in March 1842. The volunteers prepared for battle, but believed that peace was on the horizon after the release of prisoners from the failed Texan Santa Fe Expedition. Because of this, a potential attack was called off by President Sam Houston.

However, on September 11, 1842, Brig. Gen. Adrián Woll entered San Antonio with 1,000 regular infantry and 500 irregular cavalry. After this, about 200 volunteers from Gonzales, Seguin, and other lower Colorado River settlements joined under Capt. Mathew Caldwell on the east bank of Salado Creek. They met with Capt. John C. Hays's regiment of 14 rangers. The men took advantage of their good position on the bank and killed 60 Mexicans, losing only one of their own.

Simultaneously, Capt. Nicholas Mosby Dawson was traveling from La Grange with his 53-man company of volunteers to meet with Caldwell. Cut off from the larger body of their men and surrounded by Mexicans, they surrendered after a brief skirmish. The Mexicans killed 36 Texians and wounded several others, in what Americans called the Dawson Massacre.

== Recreation ==
According to Texas Parks and Wildlife, bluegill, Rio Grande cichlids, alligator gar, and common carp have been caught in Salado Creek.

== See also ==
- List of rivers of Texas
