= List of governors of Coahuila =

Head of the Mexican state of Coahuila

Governor of Coahuila

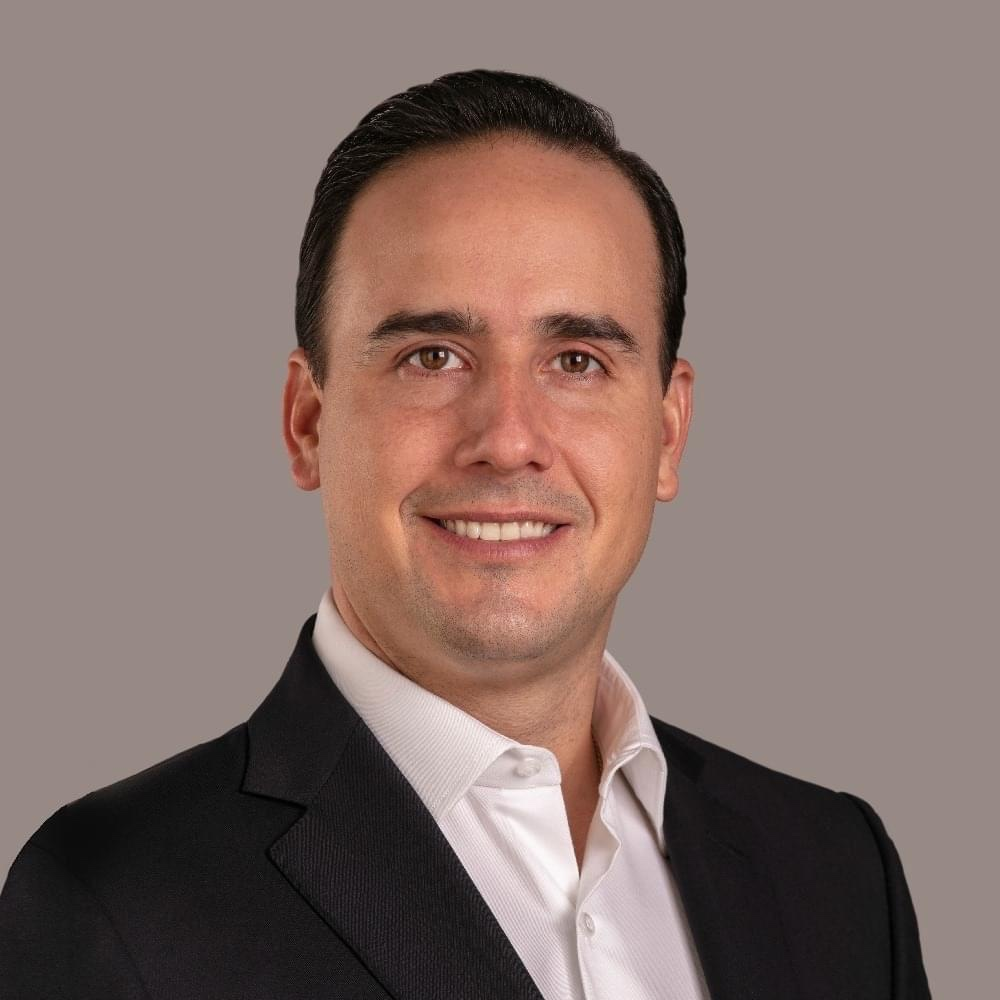
- Incumbent; Manolo Jiménez Salinas since December 1, 2023
- Inaugural holder: Alonso de León
- Formation: 1687

List of governors of the Mexican state of Coahuila de Zaragoza, since its establishment as the province of Nueva Extremadura in Northern New Spain, later province of Coahuila and Texas, and Coahuila as a Mexican state.

== Coahuila during Spanish Colonial period ==
(Includes period of Nueva Extremadura and Coahuila y Texas)

Name	Term
Alonso de León	1687–1691
Diego Ramón (interim)	1691
Domingo Terán de los Ríos	1691–1692
Gregorio de Salinas Varona	1692–1698
Francisco Cuervo y Valdés	1698–1703
Matías de Aguirre	1703–1705
Martín de Alarcón (1st time)	1705–1708
Simón de Padilla y Córdova	1708–1714
Pedro Fermín de Echevers y Subisa	1714
Juan de Valdes	1714–1716
José Antonio de Ecay Múzquiz	1716–1717
Martín de Alarcón (2nd time)	1717–1719
José de Azlor y Virto de Vera	1719–1722
Blas de la Garza Falcón (1st time)	1722–1729
Manuel de Sandoval	1729–1733
Blas de la Garza Falcón (2nd time)	1733–1735
Clemente de la Garza Falcón	1735–1739
Juan García Pruneda	1739–1744
Pedro de Rábago y Terán	1744–1754
Juan Antonio Bustillo y Ceballos	1754–1756
Miguel de Sesman y Escudero	1756–1757
Ángel de Martos y Navarrete	1757–1759
Jacinto de Barríos y Jáguregui (1st time)	1759–1762
Lorenzo Cancio Sierra y Cienfuegos	1762–1764
Diego Ortiz Parrilla	1764–1765
Jacinto de Barríos y Jáguregui (2nd time)	1765–1768
José Costilla y Terán	1768–1769
Jacobo de Ugarte y Loyola	1769–1777
Juan de Ugalde	1777–1783
Pedro Fueros	1783–1788
Juan Gutiérrez de la Cueva (1st time)	1788–1790
Miguel Jose de Emparán	1790–1795
Juan Gutiérrez de la Cueva (2nd time)	1795–1797
Antonio Cordero y Bustamante (1st time)	1797–1805
José Joaquín de Ugarte	1805–1809
Antonio Cordero y Bustamante (2nd time)	1809–1817
Antonio García de Tejada	1817–1818
José Franco	1818–1819
Manuel Pardo	1819–1820
Antonio Elosúa	1820–1822

== Coahuila as a Mexican state ==
Name	Term
Antonio Crespo	1822-03-22 –1823-08-26
Pedro Valdés	1823-08-27 –1824-02-03
José Rafael Eça y Múzquiz	1824-02-03 –1824-08-15
Rafael Gonzáles	1824-08-15 –1826-03-15
José Ignacio de Arizpe	1826-03-15 –1826-05-30
José Ignacio de Arizpe	1827-01-29 – 1827-08-01
José María Viesca	1827-08-01 – 1827-08-17
Víctor Blanco de Rivera	1827-08-17 – 1827-09-14
José María Viesca	1827-09-14 – 1830-10-01
Ramón Músquiz	1830-10-01 – 1831-01-05
José María Viesca	1831-01-05 – 1831-04-04
José María de Letona	1831-04-05 – 1831-04-28
Ramón Músquiz	1831-04-28 – 1831-05-10
José María de Letona	1831-05-10 – 1832-09-28
Ramón Músquiz	1832-09-01 – 1832-12-23
Juan Martín de Veramendi	1832-12-24 – 1833-09-07
N/A	1833-09-08 – 1834-01-07
Francisco Vidaurri y Villaseñor	1834-01-08 – 1834-07-23
Juan José Elguézabal	1834-07-23 – 1835-03-12
José María Cantú	1835-03-12 – 1835-03-24
N/A	1835-03-25 – 1835-03-26
Marcial Borrego	1835-03-27 – 1835-04-15
Agustín Viesca y Montes	1835-04-15 – 1835-06-05
N/A	1835-06-06 – 1835-07-17
José Miguel Falcón	1835-07-18 – 1835-08-13
Bartolomé de Cárdenas	1835-08-13 – 1835-08-15
José Rafael Eça y Múzquiz	1835-08-15 – 1837-03-11
Francisco García Conde	1837-03-11 – 1839-04-03
Isidro Reyes	1839-04-03 – 1841-01-05
José Ignacio de Arizpe	1841-01-05 – 1842-01-05
Francisco Mejía	1842-01-05 – 1843-03-22
José Juan Sánchez Estrada	1843-03-22 – 1843-04-27
José Antonio Vizcayno	1843-04-27 – 1844-05-15
Francisco Mejía	1844-05-15 – 1845-01-03
Santiago Rodríguez del Bosque	1845-01-03 – 1846-01-15
Rafael Vázquez	1846-01-16 – 1846-09-16
José María de Aguirre González	1846-02-07 – 1846-10-17
Santiago Rodríguez del Bosquea	1846-10-17 – 1846-10-26
José María de Aguirre González	1846-10-26 – 1847-06-30
N/A	1847-07-01 – 1848-08-07
Eduardo González Laso	1848-08-08 – 1849-02-28
Santiago Rodríguez del Bosque	1849-03-01 – 1850-09-25
Juan Vicente Campos	1850-09-25 – 1850-09-29
José María de Aguirre González	1850-09-30 – 1850-10-22
Rafael de la Fuente Berlanga	1850-10-22 – 1851-09-03
Santiago Rodríguez del Bosque	1851-09-04 – 1857-05-27
Jerónimo Cardona	1853-10-01 – 1854-10-31
Jerónimo Cardona	1854-03-01 – 1854-05-31
Santiago Vidaurri	1856-02-19 – 1864-02-26
N/A	1864-02-27 – 1864-02-28
Andrés S. Viesca Bagües	1864-03-01 – 1864-04-30
Miguel Gómez Cárdenas	1864-05-06 – 1864-05-30
N/A	1864-05-31 – 1864-05-31
Manuel de Quesada y Loynaz	1864-06-01 – 1864-06-09
Juan Antonio Claudio de la Fuente Cárdenas	1864-06-09 – 1864-10-05
Gregorio Galindo Flores	1864-10-05 – 1865-04-07
Andrés S. Viesca Bagües	1865-04-07 – 1867-02-21
Juan Antonio Claudio de la Fuente Cárdenas	1867-02-21 – 1867-03-16
Andrés S. Viesca Bagües	1867-03-17 – 1867-08-27
Antonio Valdés Carrillo	1867-08-27 – 1867-09-06
Andrés S. Viesca Bagües	1867-09-02 – 1867-12-15
Victoriano Cepeda Camacho	1867-12-15 – 1869-03-06
Juan N. Arizpe Cárdenas	1869-03-06 – 1869-06-10
Victoriano Cepeda Camacho	1869-06-10 – 1870-02-10
Melchor Lobo Rodríguez	1870-02-11 – 1870-06-02
Victoriano Cepeda Camacho	1870-06-03 – 1871-09-27
N/A	1870-06-10 – 1870-07-10
Francisco de la Peña Fuentes	1871-09-27 – 1871-11-04
Victoriano Cepeda Camacho	1871-11-04 – 1871-12-05
Hipólito Charles	1871-12-05 – 1872-07-17
Ismael Salas	1872-07-17 – 1872-08-05
Antonio de Jesús García Carrillo	1872-01-01 – 1872-01-01
Victoriano Cepeda Camacho	1872-08-05 – 1872-09-11
Miguel Palacios	1872-09-11 – 1872-09-11
Juan N. Arizpe Cárdenas	1872-09-11 – 1872-10-04
Jesús Valdés Mejía	1872-10-01 – 1872-11-01
Victoriano Cepeda Camacho	1872-11-01 – 1873-01-02
Jesús Valdés Mejía	1873-01-02 – 1873-01-18
Victoriano Cepeda Camacho	1873-01-18 – 1873-12-30
Carlos Fuero	1873-12-31 – 1874-06-05
Ismael Salas	1874-06-05 – 1874-06-17
Antonio de Jesús García Carrill	1874-06-17 – 1876-08-24
Blas Rodríguez Farías	1876-08-25 – 1876-12-04
Hipólito Charles	1876-12-04 – 1877-10-08
Melchor Lobo Rodríguez	1877-10-08 – 1877-12-27
N/A	1877-12-28 – 1877-12-30
Hipólito Charles	1877-12-31 – 1879-12-04
Jesús Valdés Mejía	1879-12-04 – 1880-03-04
Hipólito Charles	1880-03-04 – 1880-12-04
Encarnación Dávila Peña	1880-12-04 – 1880-12-15
Evaristo Madero Elizondo	1880-12-15 – 1884-05-01
Antonio V. Hernández Benavides	1882-12-13 – 1883-05-13
Encarnación Dávila Peña	1883-10-29 – 1883-12-31
Blas Rodríguez Farías	1883-12-31 – 1884-03-01
Francisco de Paula Ramos	1884-05-01 – 1884-08-29
Praxedis de la Peña García	1884-08-29 – 1884-11-20
Telésforo Fuentes	1884-11-20 – 1884-12-15
Julio María Cervantes Aranda	1884-12-15 – 1886-02-15
José María Garza Galán	1886-02-15 – 1889-12-15
Jesús de Valle de la Peña	1888-00-00 – 1888-00-00
José María Garza Galán	–1893
José María Múzquiz	–1894
Miguel Cárdenas	1894–1909
Jesús de Valle	1909–1911

== Coahuila state since the Mexican Revolution ==
Name	Party	Term	Notes
Venustiano Carranza	–	1911–1913	President of México, 1917-1920
Ignacio Alcocer	–	1913–1913	
Bruno Neyra	–	1917	
Alfredo Breceda	–	1917	
Gustavo Espinoza Mireles	–	1917–1920	
Gustavo Espinoza Mireles	–	1917–1920	
Luis Gutiérrez Ortiz	–	1920–1921	
Arnulfo González Medina	–	1921–1923	
Carlos Garza Castro	–	1923–1925	
Manuel Pérez Treviño	–	1925–1929	
Nazario S. Ortiz Garza	National Revolutionary Party, PNR	1929–1933	
Jesús Valdez Sánchez	PNR	1933–1937	
Pedro V. Rodríguez Triana	PNR	1937–1941	
Benecio López Padilla	Party of the Mexican Revolution, PRM	1941–1945	
Ignacio Cepeda Dávila	PRM	1945–1947	
Vicente A. Valerio	PRI	1947–1948	
Paz Faz Riza	PRI	1948	
Raúl López Sánchez	PRI	1948–1951	
Ramón Cepeda López	PRI	1951–1957	
Raúl Madero González	PRI	1957–1963	
Braulio Fernández Aguirre	PRI	1963–1969	
Eulalio Gutiérrez Treviño	PRI	1969–1975	
Oscar Flores Tapia	PRI	1975–1981	
Francisco José Madero González	PRI	1981	
José de las Fuentes Rodríguez	PRI	1981–1987	
Eliseo Mendoza Berrueto	PRI	1987–1993	
Rogelio Montemayor Seguy	PRI	1993–1999	
Enrique Martínez y Martínez	PRI	1999–2005	
Humberto Moreira Valdés	PRI	2005–2011	
Jorge Torres López	PRI	2011	
Rubén Moreira Valdez	PRI	2011-2017	
Miguel Riquelme Solís	PRI	2017-2023	
Manolo Jiménez Salinas	PRI	2023-	
