= Cristóbal Domínguez =

Spanish administrator

35th Governor of the Spanish Colony of Texas
- In office 1814–1814
- Preceded by: Manuel María de Salcedo
- Succeeded by: Benito Armiñán

Personal details
- Born: Unknown Unknown
- Died: 1814 San Antonio, New Philippines, New Spain, Spanish Empire
- Profession: Presidio Inspector and Governor of Texas (1814 and 1817)

Cristóbal Domínguez (¿-1814) was a Spanish administrator. He was Presidio Inspector and Governor of Texas in 1814.

== Biography ==
The date and place in which Domínguez was born are unknown. He arrived in Texas, probably by passing through New Mexico. Dominguez served as adjutant inspector of several presidios of Coahuila and Texas, a job he kept until November 26, 1810. He left the presidios for Nacogdoches following orders from governor of Texas Manuel María de Salcedo. However, Dominguez made an enemy of Commanding officer of the region, José María Guadiana, since both had different views about the Spanish control of Texas: Dominguez supported it and Guadiana did not.

So, when the Casas Revolt broke up in 1811, Guadiana imprisoned Dominguez as punishment for his mentioned political ideas.

Domínguez fled to the neighboring Louisiana, which already belonged to the United States. He settled in the region of Natchitoches, where he lived until the De Casas government fell in San Antonio. On May 1, 1811, Dominguez came back to Nacogdoches and ordered the Guadiana's imprisonment. After that, Dominguez served as Lieutenant Governor. However, he only held that position for a few months, because he was soon appointed inspector of Presidios in San Antonio, leaving the previous political office on September 20, 1811. He held this position until the Salcedo government ended in October 1813.

Shortly after he was promoted to Interim Governor of Texas by military commandant Joaquín de Arredondo. However, on December 15, 1813, Domínguez regained the position of Lieutenant Governor, also by appointment of Arredondo. Domínguez was appointed official governor of Texas in 1814. During his administration, Cristobal Dominguez established several laws, prohibiting yelling, the trade and the burning of trash, as well as the discharge guns. In addition, he imposed strict curfews. The approbation of change of house by the Texas residents was left in the hands of the Cabildo council.

Dominguez died in October 1814, being temporally replaced by Benito Armiñán (who left the charge for health reasons in July 1815), Mariano Valera (who held the position only for one week or a year, leaving it also for health reasons), Juan Ignacio Pérez, Manuel Pardo and, finally, Antonio Maria Martinez (all the previous served as interims).
