= Manuel Muñoz (governor of Spanish Texas) =

28th Governor of the Spanish Colony of Texas
- In office 1790–1798
- Preceded by: Rafael Martínez Pacheco
- Succeeded by: José Irigoyen

Personal details
- Born: March 19, 1730 Matamoros, Castile, Kingdom of Spain
- Died: July 28, 1798 (aged 68) San Antonio de Bejar, Spanish Texas, New Spain, Spanish Empire
- Spouse: María Gertrudis de Cipiran
- Profession: Colonel and Political

Manuel Muñoz (March 19, 1730 – July 27, 1799) was a soldier, colonel and governor of New Philippines between 1790 and 1798.

== Early life ==
Muñoz was born in 1730, probably in Matamoros, a city in Castile. He joined the Royal Spanish Army in his youth, where he ascended to captain. In 1759, Manuel temporarily settled in Texas as the first commander of the "Presidio del Norte". Shortly after, in 1760, the Presidio was attacked by Apache Native Americans but Muñoz aided in repelling the attack. Later, in 1775, he participated in the war between the troops of Colonel Hugo Oconór and the American Indians, commanding the troops of Nueva Vizcaya. Due to his leadership during the war, Muñoz was appointed lieutenant colonel in 1777. In the 1770s and 1780s, Muñoz worked in several "posts" in the Rio Grande region, "negotiated" with one of the Apache tribes (particularly with the Mescaleros) and carried out several military campaigns against the Native Americans of the frontier who resigned the Christian religion.

== Texas Governor ==
In 1790, Muñoz became governor of Texas. In 1792 Muñoz served as acting governor, at the same time that the Count of Sierra investigated his management. A year later, Munoz secularized the Mission San Antonio de Valero and in 1792 he also fulfilled the decree of "partial secularization" directed to the other four Spanish missions that were carried out in San Antonio.

Muñoz supervised trade among the settlers and the Native Americans and investigated illicit trade among the Spanish and French of Louisiana that existed before his term. In addition, he regulated the work of the Amerindians in their work on the churches and priestly quarters and declared that these works could only be carried out with permission from the commander general. He also "checked the mission and presidio accounts".

Native Americans gained greater autonomy: Munoz converted Native Americans who had acquired the Christian religion into independent owners of lands, upending the social structure based on race that had been established by the Spanish. In addition, the sacred ministry was the only institution in which the missionaries could work "and placed the common property of the mission Indians". This property was supervised by the authorities, either by the alcalde, a Spanish politician figure who administrated the Spanish municipalities, or the justice. In 1793, the Mission Refugio was established.

In 1795, Muñoz rose to colonel in the Army. The Crown ordered him to avoid the entrance of people from the then United States (East of the modern United States) to Texas. They believed the government of the United States wanted to send people to Texas to promote a rebellion against the government.

However, in 1796, Muñoz fell ill and asked King Philip IV for permission to resign as governor. While Muñoz awaited the king's decision, Juan Bautista Elguézabal was selected to help Muñoz. In January 1797, Muñoz received news that the governor of Coahuila, (modern Mexico), Manuel Antonio Cordero y Bustamante, had been chosen by the king to replace him. However, at that moment, Bustamante was commanding a war against the Apaches and he could not attend to his duties as governor, so Munoz continued governing Texas "until further notice". In March of that year, Cordero sent him a letter saying that he had been appointed lieutenant governor of Nuevo Santander, and that therefore he could not govern Texas. Finally, a year and a half later, in June 1798 José Irigoyen got the position of interim governor, but he couldn't serve either. Elguézabal finally took the position. Muñoz died on July 27, 1799, in San Antonio.

== Personal life ==
Muñoz married María Gertrudis del Cipiran, who was also from Castile.
