= Mariano Valera =

Spanish-Mexican soldier

Mariano Varela

Governor of the Spanish Colony of Texas
- In office July 20, 1815 – July 27, 1815 /1816
- Preceded by: Benito Armiñán
- Succeeded by: Juan Ignacio Pérez

Personal details
- Born: 1770 New Spain, Spanish Empire
- Died: Unknown
- Profession: Soldier and administrador colonial of Texas

Mariano Valera (born 1770; date of death unknown) was a Novohispanic military officer who held several administrative and command roles in the northern provinces of New Spain during the early 19th century. He served as a captain in Guajoquilla (present-day Jiménez, Chihuahua), and later as lieutenant governor under Manuel María de Salcedo in Texas. Valera was also appointed chief of the provincial government department and commander of military garrisons responsible for the defence of the region's presidios.

In 1815, Valera briefly held the position of interim governor of Texas, succeeding Cristóbal Domínguez. His tenure, like that of his predecessor Benito Armiñán, is reported by various sources as having lasted one week or one year.

== Biography ==
Born in 1770, his exact birthplace is unknown, although it is known that he was born somewhere in present-day Mexico. Around 1787, when he was seventeen, he joined the army in the region of Guajoquilla (today's Jimenez), in Coahuila. His military achievements allowed him to be promoted to the position of captain of the region.

In May 1807, after the arrival of Zebulon M. Pike's troops to Guajoquilla, Valera accompanied them to the Presidio of Río Grande, located in the catholic mission San Juan Bautista, Coahuila. Once there, Valera held the position of commander.

In August 1808 Valera was a member of a court martial led by the soldier Manuel Antonio Cordero y Bustamante, who served as governor of Texas at that time, in San Antonio, Texas. The council discussed the trip made by Napoleon's agent Octaviano d'Alvimar to New Spain. In June of the following year, Varela was assistant to the new Commanding officer of Texas, the Peninsular Spanish Bernardo Bonavía y Zapata. In this capacity he took part in the Bonavía meetings, which were held to discuss certain economic reforms the commander proposed implementing. At these meetings Varela worked as secretary.

Later, Varela was acting lieutenant governor of Manuel María de Salcedo in Texas, but in March 1810 he acquired more important political and military positions: he became the chief of the government department of Texas, and was also appointed commander of the military garrisons that defended the presidios of the province. After this, he and Bonavia appointed a number of people to important positions in the presidios. In May of that year, the Commandant-General of the Provincias Internas Nemesio Salcedo asked him to return to San Juan Bautista, where he was to lead the troops of the presidio, but he did not obey Salcedo until this one returned to San Antonio.

However, there was little that Verela could do during this new stage as leader of San Juan Bautista. This is because in January 1811 the independence fighters had gained power in the presidio, which was led by Antonio Griego, who defended the independence of New Spain from Spain and served as the commander of the place. Loyal to Ferdinand VII, he refused to accept Napoleon as the new king of Spain.

For a time, Varela commanded the Texas Cavalry, but on July 20, 1815 he was appointed interim governor of the North American province. He was appointed governor to replace Cristóbal Domínguez, who had died in office, while taking the place of Colonel Benito Armiñán, interim governor who was unable to finish his administration due to health problems. However, Verelo also had health problems when he came to command Texas, so he could only sustain the administration of the province for one week or one year.

On August 14, 1824, Varela was part of the Congressional delegation of the newly established state of Coahuila y Texas in Saltillo. He again had a seat in the same Congress on 11 March 1827. The date and place of his death are unknown.
