= Justo Boneo y Morales =

18ºGovernor of the Spanish Colony of Texas
- In office 1743–1744
- Preceded by: Tomás Felipe de Winthuisen
- Succeeded by: Francisco Garcia Larios

Personal details
- Died: September 1744 Spanish Texas, New Spain, Spanish Empire
- Profession: Military and administrator (governor of Texas)

Justo Boneo y Morales was a soldier and knight of the Order of Santiago who served as governor of Texas from 1743 to 1744.

== Biography ==
Justo Boneo y Morales joined the Spanish army when he was young. So, he had an outstanding career in the army, becoming a lieutenant colonel, as well as Captain of Grenadiers of the Regiment of the Infantry of Cantabria. He served the army for thirty-two years.

On July 15, 1740, he was sent to Louisiana, to a zone located near Los Adaes, to carry out an inspection of the area and study certain points of the administration of former Neomexicano governor Manuel de Sandoval, as well as the allegedly questionable activities realized by the group of missionaries that worked in Texas. Both authorities (Sandoval and the missionaries) had been denounced by the governor Carlos Franquis de Lugo.

After the investigation was completed, Boneo y Morales joined the military garrison of the Presidio of Nuestra Señora del Pilar de Los Adaes, which defended the region. On the other hand, The defendant, Sandoval, had to pay a significant amount of pesos (the equivalent to $500 [when?]) and was imprisoned because he did not keep correct accounting practices of his administration and for living in San Antonio, Texas when he was governor of the province, although all the governors of Texas had to live in Los Adaes, which was the capital of Texas.

Later, on December 17, 1743, Boneo was appointed governor of Texas, but he served for less than a year, since he died in September 1744, leaving the position vacant.

== Personal life ==
Boneo y Morales had several slaves, as were Luis (brought to Josepha Flores y Valdés) and Francisco Joseph (sold to the aforementioned Josepha Flores y Valdés).
