= Juan María Vicencio de Ripperdá =

Spanish governor of Texas and Honduras

Juan María Vicencio, Baron de Ripperdá

24º Governor of the Spanish Colony of Texas
- In office 1769–1776
- Preceded by: Hugo Oconór
- Succeeded by: Domingo Cabello y Robles

Governor of Spanish Honduras
- In office 1776–1780

Personal details
- Born: September 1, 1725 Madrid, Spain
- Died: October 21, 1780 (aged 55) Province of Comayagua, Captaincy General of Guatemala, New Spain, Spain
- Spouse: Mariana Gómez de Parada Gallo y Villavicencio

Juan María Vicencio de Ripperdá, Baron de Ripperdá (Madrid, Spain, 1 September 1725 - Province of Comayagua, Captaincy General of Guatemala, New Spain 21 October 1780) was a Spanish governor of the province of New Philippines and Honduras in New Spain.

== Early life ==
He was the son of Dutch political adventurer John William, Baron Ripperda and doña Francisca de Xarava del Castillo. His father was a scion of the ancient Dutch noble house of Ripperda, who became Duke of Ripperdá and Prime Minister of Spain but was forced to flee the country following a scandal. Don Juan María Vicencio was subsequently raised in Madrid by his mother and her relatives, a devoutly Catholic, aristocratic Spanish family, descended from the princes of Aragon.

Coat of Arms of Juan María Vicencio de Ripperdá

== Career ==
Baron de Ripperdá started his military career in 1743 and rose to become a colonel in 1761. In 1769, he was appointed governor of Texas by the King of Spain and set sail for Mexico. During his stay in Mexico City he met and married (22 October) doña Mariana Gómez de Parada Gallo y Villavicencio.

From February 1770, he lived in San Antonio with his wife and six children. Anticipating the impending reforms, he had made his headquarters in San Antonio rather than Los Adaes (now Robeline).

De Ripperdá's chief concern was the Apaches. He had to use threats to keep citizens from abandoning San Antonio from fear of marauders. He called for reinforcements from other presidios, which incurred the wrath of the missionaries saying he was risking ruin to the mission system. Then, fears of an imminent English attack swept over the province.

His tenure as Governor was beset by political in-fighting and constant attempts to undermine his position. As such, he found himself besieged from two directions: Viceroy Antonio María de Bucareli y Ursúa in Mexico City, and his predecessor and now commandant-inspector Hugo Oconór.

In 1772, the capital of Spanish Texas was officially moved to San Antonio. The next year, orders came to De Ripperdá to remove the East Texan establishments back into the interior, now that there was no frontier to guard following the cession of Louisiana to Spain. However, to many of the Spanish of East Texas, Los Adaes was the only home most of them know, and many had married into French families.

De Ripperdá travelled to Los Adaes hoping he could prevent the abandonment but Oconór opposed him and he went away in deep disappointment. Over the next days, the planned expulsion of the Adaesians was put into practice, and many consequently died from hardship. Their leader, Antonio Gil Ybarbo, went to Mexico City in order to petition the Viceroy to allow them to return to their homes. Only after six years of wandering were they allowed to return as close as Nacogdoches, where they made a permanent settlement, thus ending one of Texas' most tragic dramas.

One encouraging event in De Ripperdá's administration was the aid of Athanase de Mezieres in bringing the northern tribes under control. However, Oconór beclouded even this by casting suspicion on the work and belittling it, wrongly saying Ripperda favoured Frenchmen and engaged in illicit trade. As a result, the Viceroy ultimately forbade De Ripperdá all communication with Louisiana and removed him from office for non-compliance in 1778.

Although he had already appointed Governor of Honduras in 1776, De Ripperdá and his family remained in Texas until 1778. Known as a true aristocrat and inveterate snob, he was nevertheless much respected and became known as one of the most popular Spanish Governors. On 28 June 1779, the King promoted him to the rank of brigadier-general.

Baron de Ripperdá died a disillusioned man.

== Sources ==
- Herbert Eugene Bolton, Texas in the Middle Eighteenth Century (Berkeley: University of California Press, 1915; rpt., Austin: University of Texas Press, 1970)
- Fritz Leo Hoffman, The First Three Years of the Administration of Juan María, Barón de Ripperdá, Governor of Texas, 1770-1778 (M.A. thesis, University of Texas, 1930)
- Juan Agustín Morfi, History of Texas, 1673-1779 (2 vols., Albuquerque: Quivira Society, 1935; rpt., New York: Arno, 1967)
- Robert S. Weddle and Robert H. Thonhoff, Drama and Conflict: The Texas Saga of 1776 (Austin: Madrona, 1976)
