= Juan Ignacio Pérez =

Governor of Texas (1761-1823)

Governor of the Spanish Colony of Texas
- In office July 27, 1816 – March 20, 1817
- Preceded by: Mariano Valera
- Succeeded by: Manuel Pardo

Personal details
- Born: July 1761
- Died: 1823 (aged 61–62)
- Profession: Soldier and administrator

Juan Ignacio Pérez (July 1761 – 1823) was acting governor of Texas (July 27, 1816 – March 20, 1817). He also excelled as a member of the Royalist troops in Texas during the New Spain War of Independence, and in the war against the American filibusters that had invaded several places of Texas in 1819 and 1821.

== Biography ==
Juan Ignacio Pérez was born to Domingo Pérez and María Concepción de Carvajal and had twelve brothers. Although raised in a military family that participated in the various events that affected Texas, Perez became a wealthy landowner and cattle rancher in San Antonio, Texas, and in 1809 he was appointed commissioner of the ranches located in that region.

Perez always maintained a loyalty to the Spanish Monarchy, even during the New Spain War of Independence, which began in 1810. Therefore, when the war of independence broke out, the landowner joined the troops of Gen. Joaquín de Arredondo to fight against the independent troops. During the war, he occupied the position of captain of cavalry and participated in the battle of Medina. His participation in the war must have been important because he was appointed lieutenant colonel. In 1816 he was appointed interim governor of Texas, a position he held until 1817. During his administration, he fought the Comanches and freed several prisoners held by this people.

It seems that Pérez's economic power was progressively increasing because when Antonio María Martínez governed Texas (1817-1822) he had already become the main cattle raiser in San Antonio. In 1819, following Martinez' orders, Perez led an army of 550 men (later increased to 650 when they were attacked by Native American groups) to fight the American Filibuster that had invaded several places of Texas, capture them and expel them of Texas. His mission, which ended in February 1820, was successful.

In 1821, Perez had to face James Long again, who had had a prominent presence among the filibusters in the 1819 conflict, as he had formed a new troop, thus succeeding to besiege La Bahía. Perez captured Log and sent him to a prison in San Antonio.

Pérez died in 1823.

== Personal life ==
In 1781, when Pérez was only 20 years old, he married Clemencia Hernández. The couple had several children, three of whom were biological, while the others were adopted. Among the adopted children was a former prisoner of the Comanches, who was adopted by Pérez when he fought against that people. In 1804 Pérez bought the Spanish Governor's Palace for 800 pesos and converted the palace into his family's new residence. In 1814, one of his daughters, María Gertrudis Pérez Cassiano, married Manuel Antonio Cordero y Bustamante (who had been governor of Texas between 1805 and 1808), when she was only twenty-four years old, while Cordero was already sixty-one.
