= Víctor Blanco =

Víctor Blanco may refer to:

- Víctor Blanco de Rivera (fl. early 19th century), Mexican official and politician
- Víctor Manuel Blanco (1918–2011), Puerto Rican astronomer
