= Governor Blanco =

Governor Blanco may refer to:

- Cuauhtémoc Blanco (born 1973), Governor of Morelos from 2018 to 2024
- Kathleen Blanco (1942–2019), Governor of Louisiana from 2004 to 2008
- Ramón Blanco, 1st Marquess of Peña Plata (1833–1906), 109th Governor General of the Philippines from 1893 to 1896 and Governor of Cuba from 1879 to 1881
- Víctor Blanco de Rivera (fl. 1820s–1840s), 4th Governor of Coahuila y Tejas from 1826 to 1827
