= Manuel Pardo =

Manuel Pardo may refer to:

- Manuel Pardo (governor) (1774–?), Spanish soldier and governor of Spanish Texas
- Manuel Pardo (politician) (1834–1878), 31st president of Peru
- Manuel Pardo (serial killer) (1956–2012), American murderer in Florida
