= List of Texas governors and presidents =

Texas has had chief executives with the titles of governors and presidents since 1691. These were under the flags of:

- (New) Spain (governors, 1691–1821)
- Mexico (governors, 1821–1836)
- Republic of Texas (presidents, 1836–1846)
- United States of America (governors, 1846–1861 and 1865–present)
- Confederate States of America (governors, 1861–1865)

== Spanish Texas ==
From 1691 through 1821, the Spanish Texas was a part of the Viceroyalty of New Spain.

=== Governors of the province of Nueva Extremadura (Coahuila and Texas) ===
From 1691 to 1722, present-day Texas and Coahuila formed the province of Nueva Extremadura. The official seat of government was in Monclova, in present-day Coahuila.

Governor	Took office	Left office	Notes
Domingo Terán de los Ríos	January 23, 1691	March 5, 1692	Official governor; previously served as governor of Sonora y Sinaloa (1681–1686), New Spain.
Gregorio de Salinas Varona	1692	1697 (Texas) / 1698 (Coahuila)	Official governor; subsequently governed Nuevo León (1705–1707) and Honduras (1705–1709).
Francisco Cuervo y Valdés	1698	1702 (Texas) / 1703 (Coahuila)	Official governor; previously governed Nuevo León (1687–1688), then Santa Fe de Nuevo Mexico (1705–1707) subsequently.
Matías de Aguirre	1703	1705	
Martín de Alarcón (1st term)	1705	1708	Official governor; also founder of San Antonio.
Simón Padilla y Córdova	1708	1712	
Pedro Fermín de Echevers y Subisa	1712	1714	
Juan Valdez	1714	1716	Official governor.
José Antonio de Ecay y Múzquiz	1716	1717	Official governor.
Martín de Alarcón (2nd term)	1717	1719	Official governor.
José de Azlor y Virto de Vera	1719	1722	Official governor.

=== Province of Texas ===
From 1722 to 1823 Texas was an independent province and had its own governors. From 1722 to 1768 the seat of government of Texas was in Los Adaes and this was the official capital of the province from 1729 to 1772. In 1768 the seat of government was established in San Antonio, which was the capital of Texas from 1772 to 1823.

Governor	Took office	Left office	Notes
Fernando Pérez de Almazán	1722	1727	Official governor
Melchor de Mediavilla y Azcona	1727	1730	Acting and Interim governor
Juan Antonio Bustillo y Ceballos	1730	1734	Official governor; He was also governor of Coahuila (1754–1756)
Manuel de Sandoval	1734	1736	Official governor; He also served as governor of Coahuila (1729–1733)
Carlos Benites Franquis de Lugo	1736	1737	Official governor
Prudencio de Orobio y Basterra	1737	1741	Interim governor; He and Winthuisen were the only civilians that served as governors of Spanish Texas
Tomás Felipe de Winthuisen	1741	1743	Official governor
Justo Boneo y Morales	1743	1744	Official governor
Francisco García Larios	1744	1748	Interim governor
Pedro del Barrio Junco y Espriella	1748	1751	Acting governor; He also governed Nuevo León, in modern-day Mexico
Jacinto de Barrios y Jáuregui	1751	1759	Official governor; Also was governor of Coahuila (1759–1762; 1765–1768)
Ángel de Martos y Navarrete	1759	1766	Official governor
Hugo Oconór	1767	1770	Official governor
Juan María Vicencio	1770	1778	Official governor; He also governed Honduras
Domingo Cabello y Robles	1778	1786	Interim governor; He also governed Nicaragua and Cuba
Bernardo Bonavía y Zapata	1786	1786	Official governor; He was appointed governor but don't serve in office.
Rafael Martínez Pacheco	1786	1790	Official governor
Manuel Muñoz	1790	1798	Official governor
José Irigoyen	1798	1800	Interim governor; Although he was appointed as governor, he not served in office.
Juan Bautista Elguézabal	1800	1805	Interim governor; He promoted the founding of the first elementary schools in Texas
Manuel Antonio Cordero y Bustamante	1805	1808	Acting governor; Also governed Coahuila and Sonora
Manuel María de Salcedo	1808	1811 (officially until 1813)	Official governor; Temporarily deposed by de las Casas
Juan Bautista de las Casas	1811	1811	Led a coup against Salcedo and became governor for 39 days before being arrested.
Simón de Herrera	1811	1811	Ad interim governor July to December
Manuel María de Salcedo (2nd term)	1811	1813	Official governor; Continuation of your government after the temporary administration by De Casas and Herrera; dead in office
Cristóbal Domínguez	1814	1814	Official governor; dead in office
Benito Armiñán	1814	1815	Interim governor (October 1814 – July 1815). He left the charge for health reasons
Mariano Valera	1815	1816	Interim governor (July 20, 1815 – July 27, 1816). He left the charge for health reasons
Juan Ignacio Pérez	1816	1817	Interim governor (July 27, 1816 – March 20, 1817)
Manuel Pardo	1817	1817	Interim governor (March 20, 1817 – May 27, 1817); Also was governor of Coahuila (1819–20)
Antonio María Martínez	1817	1821	Official governor

== Mexican Texas ==
=== Province of Texas ===
Following the Mexican War of Independence, recognised by the Treaty of Córdoba, the territory of Texas became part of the First Mexican Empire.

Governor	Took office	Left office	Notes
José Félix Trespalacios	August 1822	April 1823	
Luciano García	June 16, 1823	October 12, 1823	He founded, toponymically, San Felipe de Austin.

=== State of Coahuila y Texas ===
After the dissolution of the first Mexican empire, the Federal Constitution of the United Mexican States of 1824 came into force, by which Texas joined Coahuila, forming the state of Coahuila and Texas, part of the United Mexican States. From 1823 to 1833 the capital and official seat of government was in Saltillo, Coahuila, while that from March 1833 until 1836, when Texas gained its independence from Mexico, the capital of the state was in Monclova, Coahuila.

Governor	Took office	Left office	Notes
Rafael Gonzales	1824-02-03	1826-03-15	
José Ignacio de Arizpe (1st term)	1826-03-15	1826-05-30	
Víctor Blanco de Rivera (1st term)	1826-05-30	1827-01-29	
José Ignacio de Arizpe (2nd term)	1827-01-29	1827-08-01	
José María Viesca (1st)	1827-08-01	1827-08-17	
Víctor Blanco de Rivera (2nd term)	1827-08-17	1827-09-14	
José María Viesca (2nd)	1827-09-14	1830-10-01	
José Rafael Eça y Múzquiz (1st term)	1830-10-01	1831-01-05	
José María Viesca (3rd)	1831-01-05	1831-04-04	
José María de Letona (1st term)	1831-04-05	1831-04-28	
José Rafael Eça y Múzquiz (2nd term)	1831-04-28	1831-05-10	
José María de Letona (2nd term)	1831-05-10	1832-09-28	
José Rafael Eça y Múzquiz (3rd)	1832-09-29	1832-12-23	
Juan Martín de Veramendi	1832-12-24	1833-09-07	
N/A	1833-09-08	1834-01-07	
Francisco Vidaurri y Villaseñor	1834-01-08	1834-07-23	
Juan José Elguézabal	1834-07-23	1835-03-12	
José María Cantú	1835-03-12	1835-03-24	
José Rafael Eça y Múzquiz (4th term)	1835-03-25	1835-03-26	
Marciél Borrego	1835-03-27	1835-04-15	
Agustín Viesca	1835-04-15	1835-06-05	
Ramón Músquiz	1835-06-06	1835-07-17	Never took office and resigned in July of that year.
José Miguel Falcón	1835-07-18	1835-08-13	
Bartolomé de Cárdenas	1835-08-13	1835-08-15	
José Rafael Eça y Múzquiz (5th term)	1835-08-15	1835-10-02 (Texas Revolution)	After the Texas' independence, Músquiz continued to govern Coahuila until 1837

== Texas Revolution ==
During the Texas Revolution, the Consultation declared independence from Mexico. An interim government was formed pending elections. The capital of the American colony of Texas was established in San Felipe de Austin.

President	Took office	Left office	Notes
Henry Smith	1835	1836-01-11	Impeached.
James W. Robinson	1836-01-11	1836-03-02	

== Republic of Texas ==
President	Took office	Left office	Notes
David G. Burnet	1836	1836	Burnet County; (acting) Vice-president of Texas under Lamar, U.S. Senator-Elect 1866.
Sam Houston	1836	1838	Houston; Houston County; also served as Governor and U.S. Senator, and formerly in Tennessee as Governor and U.S. Representative. Referred to as the first President of the Republic of Texas.
Mirabeau B. Lamar	1838	1841	Lamar County; Minister to Nicaragua.
Sam Houston	1841	1844	Houston; Houston County; also served as U.S. Representative and Governor for Tennessee, and as Governor and U.S. Senator for Texas.
Anson Jones	1844	1846	Jones County.

== State of Texas ==
See: List of governors of Texas
