= José Ignacio de Arizpe =

2nd Governor of Coahuila and Tejas
- In office 1826-03-15 – 1826-05-30
- Preceded by: Rafael Gonzáles
- Succeeded by: Víctor Blanco de Rivera

Personal details
- Born: December 31, 1783 Saltillo, Coahuila
- Died: February 11, 1844 (aged 60) Saltillo
- Spouse: Liberata Ramos y Valdés
- Profession: Political

José (or Juan) Ignacio de Arizpe Cárdenas (December 31, 1783 – February 11, 1844) was interim governor of the Mexican province of Coahuila y Tejas, as well as mayor of Monclova and Saltillo, deputy and Vice Governor of Coahuila y Tejas.

== Biography ==
Cárdenas was born on December 31, 1783, in Saltillo, Coahuila. Arizpe was the son of Francisco Ildefonso Arizpe Cortes and Rosalía Loreta Cárdenas Flores. It is known that he had at least a brother, Juan Nepomuceno.

For a time he dedicated himself to agriculture and livestock. However, he was also a merchant between 1809 and 1813, performing that work in Texas. Arizpe served as mayor of Saltillo, serving in that position for more than five periods between the years 1816 and 1839. On July 2, 1821, Arizpe served on the Governing Board of Saltillo whose purpose was the proclamation of independence from Spain, accepting the Plan of Iguala. In that same year (1821), he was mayor of Monclova. In 1826 he served as vice governor. He was officially appointed governor of Coahuila on March 15, 1826, and served until April 30 of the same year. However, he was elected governor of the same province again on January 29, 1827. It was during this second stage that Coahuila and Texas were unified, becoming one state. Arizpe governed the state until August 1 of the same year (1827). He governed Coahuila for the third time in 1841. In 1844 he held the position of senator of Mexico.

Arizpe also served as administrator of tax revenues and post offices.

Arizpe died on February 11, 1844, in Saltillo.

== Personal life ==
Arizpe married Liberata Ramos y Valdés.
