= Juan Bautista Elguézabal =

Juan Bautista Elguezábal

30th Governor of the Spanish Colony of Texas
- In office 1800 – October 5, 1805
- Preceded by: José Irigoyen
- Succeeded by: Manuel Antonio Cordero y Bustamante

Personal details
- Born: 1741
- Died: October 5, 1805 (aged 63–64) San Antonio de Bejar, Texas, New Spain, Spanish Empire
- Spouse: Maria Gertrudis Ximenez
- Children: Juan José Elguezabal
- Profession: Political

Juan Bautista Elguézabal (1743–1805) was the temporary head of the Spanish province of Texas in 1797, and the Governor of Texas from 1800 to 1805. He also temporarily ruled the province of Louisiana in 1803. Elguézabal favored the increase of the population of Texas through the immigration from Louisiana, as well as the foundation of the first schools of primary education in the province, which were established, at least, in La Bahía (modern-day Goliad) and Nacogdoches.

== Biography ==
=== Early years ===
Elguézabal was born in 1741, though the place of his birth is unknown. Between 1795 and 1797, he served as assistant inspector of the presidios of the province of Coahuila and Texas, in New Spain. A year later, in 1796, he began to work with the Governor of Texas, Manuel Muñoz, who had fallen ill and was waiting for approval of his retirement from the king of Spain. So, Elguézabal served as the personal assistant of Muñoz. In August 1797, Elguézabal was appointed acting governor of the provincia. At this time, he investigated La Bahia and Rosario presidios, to check their strengths and weaknesses.

=== Government of Texas ===
On July 27, 1799, Elguézabal assumed the position of Governor of Texas in the absence of originally appointed governor José Irigoyen, who had failed to accept the position. In 1803, Elguézabal was also appointed acting governor of Louisiana, after this territory was ceded to the United States. Many citizens of Louisiana sent Elguézabal petitions requesting permission to settle in Texas, partially causing an influx of immigration to the province (including many men looking for land). Runaway slaves also contributed to this population increase, as Spain declared that any slave who crossed the Sabine River into Texas would automatically be freed. Most of these escaped slaves joined American Indian tribes, but some settled in the East Texas forests. However, it is not to be assumed that slavery was completely banned from the province; for example, certain French and Spanish slaveholders who moved to Texas were permitted to retain their slaves.

Elguézabal promoted a more liberal policy than the province had held up to that time, improving the living conditions of its inhabitants (previously, the province had a high poverty rate that affected most of its population). He allowed the Alabama-Coushatta and Choctaw Native American tribes to move eastern zone of the Trinity River, under the autonomy that those tribes had acquired during the tenure of Manuel Muñoz, and through the granting of permits.

==== Relations with US ====
The Spanish Commandant-general of the Provincias Internas, Nemesio Salcedo, who served under Elguézabal, sent him a letter requesting him to order his officials to establish good relations with United States, but to refrain from communication with American officials. Concerned about the threat that the Americans posed to the relatively weak local Spanish forces, Salcedo ordered Ugarte, Commandant of the District of Natchitoches, to inform him about the number of US troops stationed in the district, the existence of militias or regulars in these troops, and the caliber of twenty artillery pieces that the US troops had in the city.

In August 1800, Elguézabal received orders from Pedro de Nava, the Commander-in-chief of the Provincias Internas, to take the horse-trader and freebooter Philip Nolan to prison in secret, because he suspected Nolan was a spy sent by the US government, if they discovered he was one. Commandant José Vidal (in his charge as Commandant of Concordia, near Natchez), further indicated to Elguézabal that Nolan was leading a group of thirty or forty men. However, Vidal failed to convince the Supreme Court of Mississippi to deny Nolan a passport to Texas.

==== First schools in Texas and the end of his term ====
Between 1803 and 1804, Salcedo wrote another letter to Elguézabal asking to build primary education schools and send teachers to instruct the "people of the frontier" in basic literacy (reading and writing). Elguézabal ordered the construction of several schools (the first of Texas's schools were established during the Elguézabal's administration) and sent teachers to the province. The teachers monthly obtained one-fourth of a peso for every boy who was enrolled in school (as girls were not permitted to enroll). A school was established in the presidio of La Bahia del Espiritu Santo by 1804. No schools were built in Nacogdoches until 1805, as the inhabitants of the city were very dispersed and the most young boys were employed as ranch hands. In addition, the teachers obtained a house that had a room that could also be used for teaching. It was during this time that Jose Francisco Ruiz became in first schoolmaster in San Antonio, although he had to teach at home.

In the absence of Irigoyen, Elguézabal remained in the position of governor of Texas past his initial end-term date in 1800. He died on October 5, 1805, in the city of San Antonio, when he still governed Texas.

== Personal life ==
Juan Bautista Elguézabal married to Maria Gertrudis Ximenez and they had four children, one of whom was Juan José Elguézabal, the governor of Mexican Texas from 1834 to 1835.

Basic Genealogy Juan Bautista Ramon Elguézabal was born in September of 1743 in Biscay, Spain Legitimate son of Augustin Elguézabal (1714-???) and Juana Vitorica (1716-???)
