= List of colonial governors of Nicaragua =

This is a list of Colonial Governors of Nicaragua.

== Governors of Veragua (1508–1536) ==
(The Governorate of Veragua was established in 1508 and included the Caribbean Coast of modern Nicaragua. Nicaragua was not conquered until 1522 – 1527)

- 1508–1511 Diego de Nicuesa
- 1511–1514 Vasco Núñez de Balboa
- 1534–1536 Felipe Gutiérrez y Toledo

== Gobernadors of Castilla de Oro (1514–1529) ==
(The Governorate of Castilla del Oro was established in 1514 and included the Pacific Coast of modern Nicaragua)

- 1514–1526 Pedro Arias Dávila
- 1526–1529 Pedro de los Ríos y Gutiérrez de Aguayo

== Governors of Nicaragua (1527–1540) ==
(Nicaragua was conquered between 1522 and 1527).

- 1527–1528: Diego López de Salcedo y Rodríguez
- 1528–1531: Pedro Arias Dávila
- 1531–1535: Francisco de Castañeda
- 1535: Diego Álvarez de Osorio
- 1536–1542: Rodrigo de Contreras y de la Hoz

== Governors of the Province of Nicaragua (1540–1553) ==
- 1542–1544 Rodrigo de Contreras y de la Hoz
- 1544 Diego de Herrera
- 1545–1548 Alonso de Maldonado
- 1548–1552 Alonso López de Cerrato

== Alcaldes Mayors of Nicaragua (1552–1567) ==
(This was established after the elimination of the Nicaragua Province by Real Audiencia of Guatemala)

- 1552–1553 Alonso Ortiz de Argueta
- 1553 Nicolás López de Zárraga
- 1553–1555 Juan de Cavallón y Arboleda
- 1555 Juan Márquez
- 1555–1556 Álvaro de Paz
- 1556–1557 Nicolás López de Zárraga
- 1558 Andrés López Moraga
- 1558–1560 Francisco de Mendoza
- 1560–1561 Juan de Cavallón y Arboleda
- 1561–1564 Juan Vázquez de Coronado
- 1564–1567 Bernardo Bermejo

== Governors of the Province of Nicaragua (1565–1787) ==
(Provisional reinstatement)

- 1565 Juan Vázquez de Coronado
- 1567–1575 Alonso de Casaos
- 1575–1576 Francisco del Valle Marroquín
- 1576–1583 Diego de Artieda Chirino y Uclés
- 1583–1589 Hernando Casco
- 1589–1592 Carlos de Arellano, interim governor
- 1592–1593 Bartolomé de Lences, interim governor
- 1593–1603 Bernardino de Obando
- 1603–1622 Alonso Lara de Córdoba
- 1622 Cristóbal de Villagrán, interim governor
- 1622–1623 Alonso Lazo
- 1623–1625 Santiago Figueroa
- 1625–1627 Lázaro de Arbizúa
- 1627–1630 Juan de Agüero
- 1630–1634 Francisco de Azagra y Vargas
- 1634–1641 Pedro de Velasco
- 1641–1653 Juan de Bracamonte
- 1653–1659 Juan de Chaves y Mendoza
- 1660–1665 Diego de Castro
- 1665–1669 Juan Fernández de Salinas y de la Cerda
- 1669–1675 Antonio de Temiño y Dávila
- 1675–1681 Pablo de Loyola
- 1681–1682 Antonio Coello de Portugal
- 1682–1692 Pedro Álvarez Castrillón
- 1692–1696 Gabriel R. Bravo de Hoyos
- 1696–1705 Luis de Colmenares
- 1705–1706 Miguel de Camargo
- 1706–1720 José Calvo de Lara
- 1720–1722 Sebastián de Arancibia
- 1722–1727 Antonio de Poveda
- 1727–1728 Pedro Martínez de Uparrio, interim governor
- 1728–1730 Tomás Duque de Estrada
- 1730–1739 Bartolomé González Fitoria
- 1739–1740 Antonio de Ortiz, gobernador
- 1740–1745 José Antonio Lacayo de Briones y Palacios
- 1745 Francisco Antoniode Cáceres y Molinedo
- 1745 Juan de Vera
- 1745–1746 José Antonio Lacayo de Briones y Palacios
- 1746–1752 Alonso Fernández de Heredia
- 1759–1761 Pantaleón Ibáñez, gobernador
- 1761–1766 Melchor Vidal de Lorca y Villena, interim governor
- 1766–1776 Domingo Cabello y Robles
- 1776–1779 Manuel de Quiroga
- 1779–1783 José de Estachería
- 1783–1787 Juan de Ayssa

== Intendants de León (1787–1814) ==
(The Corregimientos and Alcaldías Mayores were abolished, and their territories were grouped to the Province of Nicaragua to form the Intendancy of León).

- 1787–1793 Juan de Ayssa
- 1794–1811 José Salvador y Antoli
- 1811–1814 Nicolás García Jerez

== Senior political leaders of the Province of Nicaragua y Costa Rica (1812–1814) ==
(Unification of the intendancy of León and the Province of Costa Rica)

- 1812–1814 Juan Bautista Gual y Curvelo

== Intendants de León (1814–1820) ==
(reinstatement)

- 1814–1816 Juan Bautista Gual y Curvelo
- 1816–1818 Manuel de Beltranena
- 1818–1820 Miguel González Saravia y Colarte

== Senior political leaders of the Province of Nicaragua y Costa Rica (1820–1821) ==
(reinstatement)

- 1820–1821 Miguel González Saravia y Colarte

== See also ==
- List of presidents of Nicaragua
