= Pedro del Barrio Junco y Espriella =

Spanish colonial administrator

Pedro del Barrio Junco y Espriela

26th governor of Nuevo León (1st time)
- In office 1740–1746
- Preceded by: Juan Antonio Fernández de Jáuregui y Urrutia
- Succeeded by: Vicente Bueno de Borbolla

20th governor of the Spanish Colony of Texas
- In office 1748–1750
- Preceded by: Francisco García Larios
- Succeeded by: Jacinto de Barrios y Jáuregui

28th governor of Nuevo León (2nd time)
- In office 1752–1757
- Preceded by: Vicente Bueno de Borbolla
- Succeeded by: Juan Manuel Muñoz de Villavicencio

Personal details
- Born: July 15, 1682 Llanes (Asturias, Spain)
- Died: Unknown Unknown
- Spouse: Maria Antonia Rodríguez
- Profession: Political

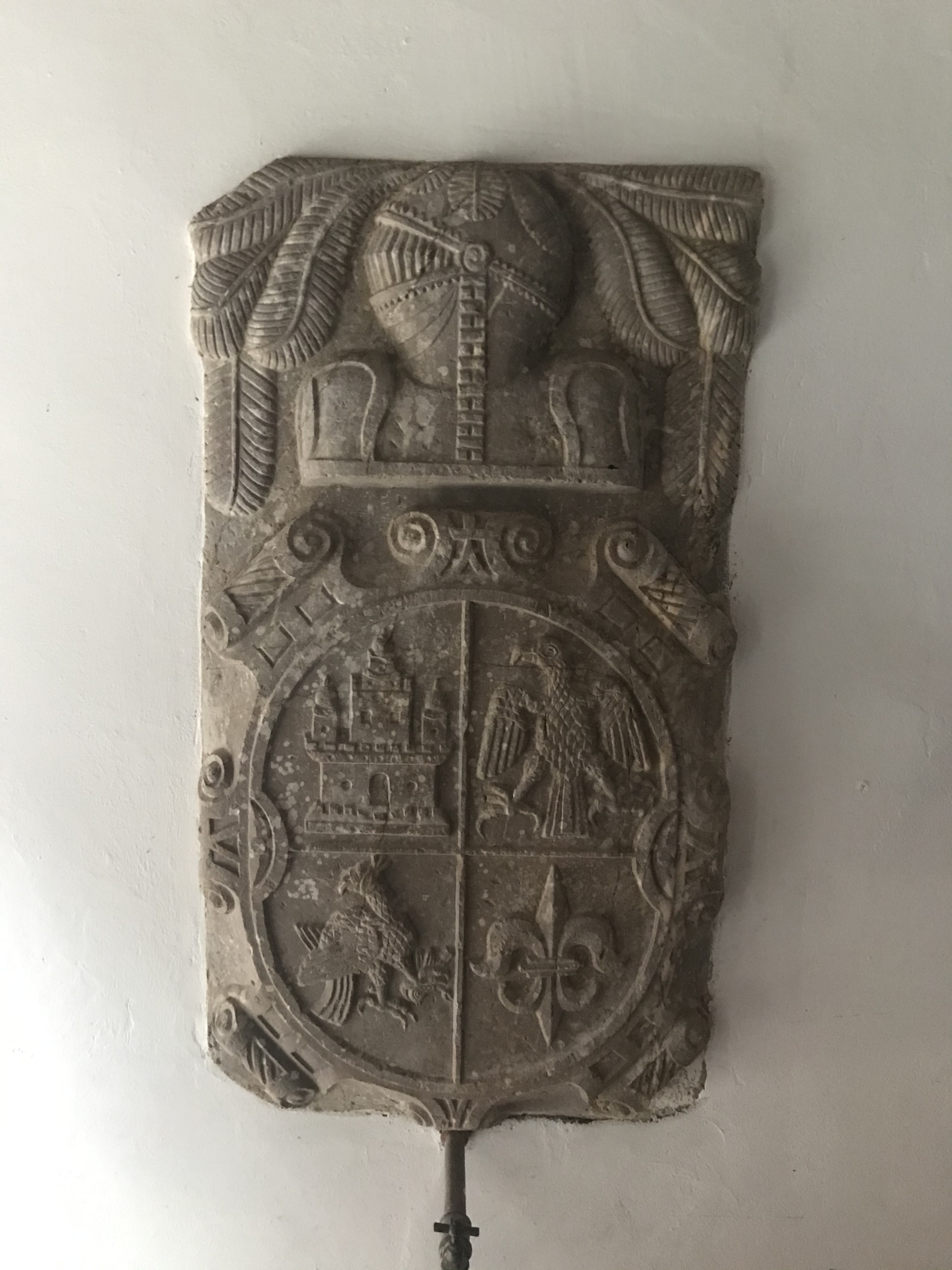
Family coat of arms of Pedro del Barrio Junco y Espriella

Pedro del Barrio Junco y Espriella (July 15, 1682 – ?) was acting governor of Texas from 1748 to 1750 and twice the governor of Nuevo León, New Spain (1740–1746 and 1752–1757).

== Biography ==
Junco y Espriella was born on July 15, 1682, in Carranzo, Llanes (Asturias, Spain). He was the son of Felipe de Barrio Junco y Espriella and Ana Maria Noriega Rubín de Celis. He had a brother, Nicolás de Junco y Espriela, Knight of Calatrava.

He was a knight of the Order of Santiago. He joined the Spanish Army in his youth, attaining the position of colonel. In 1716, he traveled to modern Mexico as a knight of the Viceroy, Baltasar de Zúñiga. After that, he returned to Spain, and in 1724 he was appointed Governor of Marquezado Valley, in Mexico, so he returned to this place.

In 1740, the Spanish Crown appointed him Governor the Mexican state of Nuevo León. He finished this term in 1746. Two years later, on June 3, 1748, he was appointed the interim governor of Texas. He discussed with the friars the place where the Mission San Xavier del Bac should be established, because were not in agreement about the right place for the foundation of the mission. However, he did not get the friars to accept his opinion and the mission was established in Tucson, Arizona. However, In June 1749, Junco y Espriella spoke with Juan Galván, an explorer who led the Mission San Xavier del Bac, to devise a plan to organize an expedition in the valley of San Javier (San Gabriel). He personally investigated the valley to decide how to conduct the expedition. On August 28, after returning from his expedition, Barrio decided to elect Lieutenant Galván to lead a new group of soldiers to San Javier. He jailed the first regidor to be appointed in San Antonio, but this imprisonment lasted a short time. In 1750, a French soldier, the son of explorer and soldier Louis Juchereau, asked Junco y Espriella for a permit that would allow him to trade with the Caddo people. Junco y Espriella refused to surrender a license, so the soldier carried many goods to the Caddo territory and tried to convince the indigenous people that the Spanish rejected their friendship since they had tried to prevent the delivery of goods to this people.

However, Espriella kept alive the trade between French and residents in Texas, as well as the gambling, even though these things were forbidden in the Spanish America. This caused him to be expelled from the Texas government in 1750.

In spite of this, Espriella was appointed governor of Nuevo León for the second time, between 1752 and 1757, and he led many campaigns against Amerindian peoples. Later, he served as provincial alcalde of the Santa Hermandad (Brotherhood) of New Spain. On March 27, 1765, he became in captain of the Presidio of El Paso del Norte, Mexico. Apparently, after this position, he was not reappointed to any other official position. His place and date of death are not known.

== Personal life ==
Pedro de Barrio Junco y Espriella was married to Maria Antonia Rodriguez, and they had two children.
