= Benito Armiñán =

Spanish soldier who served as interim governor of Texas (1814-1815)

Governor of the Spanish Colony of Texas
- In office October 1814 – July 1815
- Preceded by: Cristóbal Domínguez
- Succeeded by: Mariano Valera

Personal details
- Profession: Soldier and administrador of Texas

Benito Armiñán was a Spanish soldier who served as interim governor of Texas, replacing Cristóbal Domínguez, from October 1814 to July 1815, resigning from the government of the province due to health problems. He also stood out as the leader of the Extremadura Battalion, which fought against the pro-independence troops in several places in New Spain: Texas, Tamaulipas and San Luis Potosí.

== Biography ==
Armiñán joined the Spanish army in his youth, becoming a colonel. He joined the Spanish battalion of Extremadura, which he went on to lead.

Later, Armiñán was appointed General Commander of the Huasteca, in the north of Veracruz.

In 1813, Armiñán led his battalion to Texas to fight against the Republican troops seeking independence from New Spain. He arrived in the province after the Battle of Medina had ended, but had to suppress some insurgent movements that rose up against the Spanish Crown.

Later, in October 1814, Armiñán was appointed interim governor of Texas to replace Cristóbal Domínguez, but he only held the position until July 1815, resigning from the government of the province due to health problems. Shortly afterwards, the viceroy ordered Armiñán to travel with his troops to Tampico and Altamira, in Tamaulipas (in the north of present-day Mexico), to fight against the Republican troops.

In 1817, his battalion participated in the Battle of Peotillos, near the old hacienda of the same name, in San Luis Potosi. Leading a troop of two thousand soldiers, they attacked the troops of Francisco Xavier Mina. However, Mina defeated Armiñán in a space of only three hours. In this battle, Armiñán lost a fifth of the army that had arrived with him.
