= José María Garza Galán =

Mexican politician

José María Garza Galán (November 6, 1846 in Múzquiz, Coahuila – October 7, 1902 in Monterrey, Nuevo León) was a Mexican politician. He was the governor of Coahuila from 1885 to 1889.

== Life ==
Garza Galán was elected governor of Coahuila in 1885 and served until 1889. Through his position, he amassed wealth and power, to the frustration of businessmen in the state. President Porfirio Díaz appointed him to another term as governor in 1893, but Venustiano Carranza organized a militia and revolted. Carranza's rebellion was successful, and Díaz sent Bernardo Reyes to negotiate with Carranza, which resulted in Garza Galán ending his candidacy.

== See also ==
- History of Mexico
- Emilio Salinas
