= Pedro Fermín de Echevers y Subisa =

7th Governor of Texas and 9th of Coahuila
- In office 1712–1714
- Preceded by: Simón Padilla y Córdova
- Succeeded by: Juan Valdez

Personal details
- Profession: Political

Pedro Fermín de Echevers y Subisa (-?) was the governor of the New Spain provinces of Coahuila and Texas between 1712 and 1714.

== Biography ==
Subisa was named governor of the provinces of Coahuila and Texas between 1711 and 1712. He began his government in the latter of these years.

During his administration, particularly in 1713, the indigenous tribe of the "tripas blancas" (white guts) staged a revolt under the leadership of the chief Dieguillo. Subisa did not believe he would be able to suppress the revolt. For this reason, he and the Captain for Life of the Presidio of Río Grande José Antonio de Ecay y Múzquiz, future governor of Coahuila and Texas, asked for help from the viceroy of New Spain the Duke of Linares. At his request, Ecay y Musquiz asked the mayor of Saltillo Juan Fermín de Casa Fermiza to send a troop to suppress the revolt. However, in 1714, before the meeting of the junta in Saltillo was held, Subisa was assassinated by the soldier Sebastian Maldonado. Thus, the government of Coahuila and Texas was vacant until the appointment of Juan Valdez. The junta, held in that city on August 5, 1714, unanimously approved sending aid to stop the revolt, although it was reported that Subisa had been assassinated. However, Dieguillo decided to abandon the revolt, so the planned aid was discarded.
