= Emilio Salinas =

Mexican politician

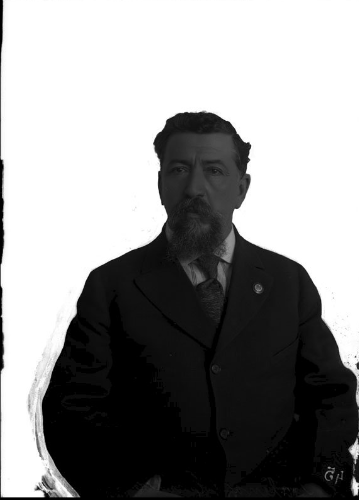
Emilio Salinas

José Emilio Salinas Balmaceda (4 October 1864 – 15 March 1924) was a military man and Mexican politician that participated in the Mexican Revolution and served as Governor of Querétaro and Chihuahua.

== Biography ==
He was born in Cuatro Ciénegas, Coahuila; He was a relative of Venustiano Carranza. He entered politics in 1893, as oppositional to the Governor Jose Maria Garza Galan, who tried to reelect. Emilio Salinas was one of those who took up arms to fight this Governor.

Since 1910 he sympathized with antireeleccionismo, and took up arms in April 1911 against the regime of Porfirio Díaz. In 1912 he fought with Pascual Orozco. In 1913 he joined Venustiano Carranza to fight the government of Victoriano Huerta. It operated in Coahuila and attained the rank of brigadier general in 1914. In early 1915 he was defeated by Doroteo Arango in the town of Ramos Arizpe, where he lost many men.

During the stay of Venustiano Carranza in Santiago de Querétaro he was appointed Governor and Military Commander of that State. He was later head of the factory establishment and military supplies, and Senator by Coahuila in 1918; then he was appointed Consul of Mexico in San Antonio, Texas, and later was Provisional Governor of Chihuahua, from 13 March to 26 April 1920. With the Triumph of the Plan of Agua Prieta was deposed from that position, and retired from public life.

He died in the city of Laredo, Texas in 1924. He married Virginia Caarmiña. His son Gustavo Salinas reached the rank of general during the Mexican Revolution.
