= José Irigoyen =

Spanish administrator

29th Governor of the Spanish Colony of Texas
- In office 1798–1800
- Preceded by: Manuel Muñoz
- Succeeded by: Juan Bautista Elguézabal

Personal details
- Born: unknown unknown
- Died: unknown unknown
- Profession: Politician

José Irigoyen (??-??) was an eighteenth century administrator. He was appointed Spanish acting governor of Texas in 1798, but he never assumed the position.

== Biography ==
Irigoyen's date and place of birth are unknown. The first thing about him is that he was living in Spain when was appointed governor of Texas in 1798. In his years of service, he never got to hold the office.

In 1796, Manuel Muñoz began to get sick and could no longer hold the office of governor. On August 5, 1797, Pedro de Nava asked Muñoz to give up both the "company and archives" of San Antonio (which was the capital of Texas at this time) to Irigoten when he arrived in Texas. (Note: Nava served as commander in chief of the unified Interior Provinces for ten years (1793–1802).) José Irigoyen was appointed governor in 1798, but he did not move in the region because he fell ill. After Muñoz death in August 1799 Nava, who was still awaiting Irigoyen's arrival, appointed Juan Bautista Elguézabal as acting governor, who occupied this position until his death.
