= Luis de las Casas =

American politician

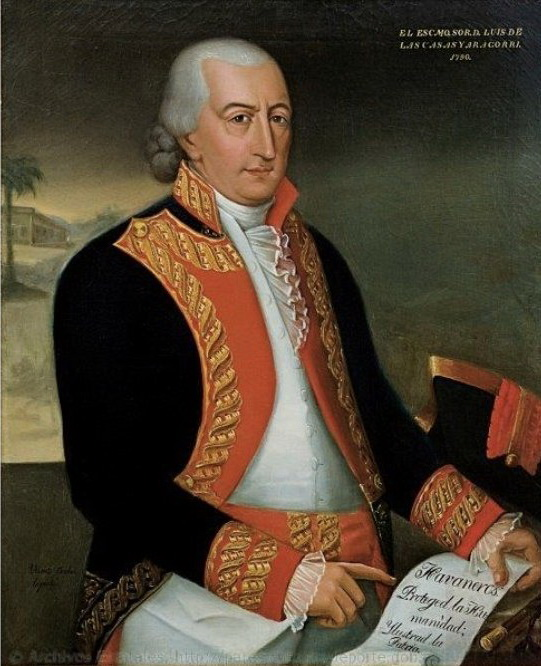
Portrait of Luis de Las Casas by Vicente Escobar, circa 1790s

Luis de las Casas y Aragorri (Sopuerta, Spain, 25 August 1745 – Puerto de Santa María, 19 July 1800) was Spanish Governor of Cuba and the Commander in Chief of the Province of Louisiana and the Floridas.

== Links ==
Auñamendi Eusko Entziklopedia

Government offices
Preceded by Domingo Cabello y Robles	Spanish Governor of Cuba; 1790 - 1796	Succeeded by Juan Procopio Bassecourt y Bryas
