= Prudencio de Orobio y Basterra =

Spanish merchant, landowner and soldier

Prudencio de Orobio Y Basterra

16ª Governor of the Spanish Colony of Texas
- In office 1737–40/41
- Preceded by: Carlos Benites Franquis de Lugo
- Succeeded by: Tomás Felipe de Winthuisen

Personal details
- Profession: Merchant, soldier and Governor of Texas (1737–1740/41)

Prudencio de Orobio Y Basterra was a Spanish merchant, landowner and soldier who served as the Interim Governor of Texas between 1737 and 1740–41 and Mayor of Parras de la Fuente, in Coahuila (in modern Mexico).

== Early life ==
Initially, Orobio was owner of several Haciendas (estates) in Saltillo (in present Mexico), particularly those of Santa María and Mesillas, although he delivered them to a Captain of the Spanish army, Juan de Tameo, in 1707, "with ten small livestock sites, two major cattle herds and ten of Cavalry". Orobio joined the Spanish Army during his youth, where he was promoted to Coronel.

== Official ==
He left the military when the governor of Nueva Vizcaya, New Spain, appointed him Alcalde Mayor (mayor) of Parras de la Fuente, Nueva Vizcaya, New Spain (modern Coahuila, Mexico). In 1737 he was appointed Governor of the province of Texas by the governor of Nuevo Leon José Fernández de Jáuregui y Urrutia, who had investigated the mismanagement of Governor Carlos B. Franquis de Lugo in Texas.

Little is known about his administration. Osorio reportedly tried to fix all the damage that Franquis de Lugo had done to the missions of San Antonio. In 1739, an epidemic broke out in Texas, but Prudencio managed to survive. After that, the missions grew and the first stone buildings were built in these locations.

After April 1738, the governor devised military campaigns against the Apache settlements. However, even after signing peace agreements with the Apaches, assaults and "depredations" of this people in Texas continued between June 1738 and September 1739. Places such as the around San Antonio and the port of Cíbolo were attacked by them.

He traded with the French, but the settlers complained about it, as trade with the French was illegal. However, when he heard that the French were trading at lower Trinity or that perhaps they were tried to settle there, in Spanish territory, he sent expeditions to find them, but these failed. Later, he pursued them until he understood that they merely were trying to earn a few pesos in the forest like any other civilization that was there.

In 1739, Governor Orobio y Basterra named modern Port Aransas as "Aránzazu Pass" on a map he elaborated, because it served Aránzazu fort.

Orobio left office between 1740 and 1741, replaced by Tomás Felipe de Winthuisen.
