= Tomás Felipe de Winthuisen =

17ºGovernor of the Spanish Colony of Texas
- In office 1741–1743
- Preceded by: Prudencio de Orobio y Basterra
- Succeeded by: Justo Boneo y Morales

Personal details
- Profession: Political

Tomás Felipe de Winthuisen (aka Thomás Phelipe) was governor of the Province of Texas from 1741 to 1743.

== Career ==
Coat of Arms of Tomás Felipe Winthuysen

He was born in the early eighteenth century, but little is known about his life. He was appointed governor of the Province of Texas in 1741, to replace to Prudencio de Orobio y Basterra. During his administration, San Antonio was attacked by Apaches. For the first time, the Texas's government was informed about the presence of Comanche tribes in the North of the province.

He established a recovery program to repair the ruins of the Presidio of Los Adaes. So he renovated the palisade and ordered the construction of several government buildings and the establishment of five new barracks (things that were done). In addition, he favored the renovation and improvement of the farms and the increase of the population of Los Adaes. In addition, unlike most governors, Winthuisen prevented the development of trade with the French, which was officially illegal. He left government in 1743, being replaced by Justo Boneo y Morales.

One year after his replacement in the Texas government in 1744, Winthuisen (through a report) pointed out the need to reduce the number of soldiers of Los Adaes, who were 60 people, leaving only 40 of them in the garrison. This was because he believed that it would diminish the French's chances of trading in Texas. On the other hand, he feared French military might, believing that the soldiers of Los Adaes (even if they were 600 people, he said) were incapable of defeating an alliance between the French and Amerindians, if they attacked Los Adaes. The former governor Virto de Vera decided to build a Presidio with a large square with bastions at each corner. However, later, Tomas Felipe de Winthuisen traveled the region in 1744 and reported that a presidio as such did not exist, "for only its poorly formed houses make up square plaza, without any wall or stockade". One of these small houses served as the first home (and office) of the Captain of the Presidio.
