= Domingo Cabello y Robles =

Spanish military officer

42nd Governor of Nicaragua, Viceroyalty of New Spain
- In office 1766–1776
- Preceded by: Melchor Vidal de Lorca y Villena
- Succeeded by: Manuel de Quiroga

25th Governor of Spanish Texas, Viceroyalty of New Spain
- In office 1778–1786
- Preceded by: Juan María Vicencio
- Succeeded by: Bernardo Bonavía y Zapata

10th Governor of Cuba in 2nd Spanish Suzerainty, Viceroyalty of New Spain
- In office 18 April 1789 – 1790
- Preceded by: José Manuel de Ezpeleta
- Succeeded by: Luis de las Casas y Aragorri

Personal details
- Born: 1725 León, Spain
- Died: unknown unknown
- Profession: Office and governor

Domingo Cabello y Robles (1725 – after 1797) was a Spanish military officer who served as the governor of Nicaragua (1764–1776), Texas (1778 and 1786) and Cuba (1789–1790). His legislation in Texas was widely criticized.

== Early years ==
Domingo Cabello y Robles was born in León, Spain, around 1725. As a youth, he joined the Royal Spanish Army of Leon, where he became an officer. In 1741, he joined an infantry regiment, serving as Lieutenant.

In 1742, he traveled to Santiago de Cuba, and the flotilla was attacked by a warship of English origin. He returned to Spain in 1749. However, shortly after, the King appointed him Mayor and sent him back to Cuba, where he served as commander of "a fixed regiment of four battalions", which belonged to the garrison of Cuba and to the presidios of Florida. In 1762, he managed to defeat the British, who tried to invade Havana. Thereafter, the king appointed him as governor of Nicaragua. This appointment became official on December 12, 1764, with his governorship ending on July 20, 1776.

== Governor of Texas ==
On October 29, 1778 Cabello was appointed interim governor of Texas. Initially, he helped the Lipan Apache people in their struggle against the Comanches. Later, due to the strength of the Comanche and his desire to end their countless raids into Spanish territory, he enlisted Pedro Vial and Francisco Xavier Chavez to attempt to negotiate peace with the Comanche people. In October 1785, a peace treaty between the Spanish and Comanches was enacted, achieving an acceptable peace in the north of the border until his government ended. However, the Apaches still were a threat in the South and the lands spread until Pecos.

The previous administration of Ripperdá had driven most of Texas population into poverty. In addition, massive exports of products of animal origins caused a depletion of livestock, resulting in cattle raiding (to continue producing products of animal origins, an economic activity practiced by many families in Texas) and the failure of an ordinance issued in January 1778. Cabello tried to comply with regulation of exports and made attempts to prevent illegal exports of products. Therefore, on July 10, 1783, he set the so-called "Bando" (Side) law, which required compliance with certain guidelines for the shipment of unmarked livestock to other locations, as well as for roundup and branding.

Cabello set a number of changes and improvements in Texas during his administration. He created a new province joining Texas (which belonged to the Audiencia Real (Supreme Court) of the Mexico's jurisdiction) to Guadalajara. Later, many residents of Bucareli (place located near Trinity River), abandoned this city and settled in Nacogdoches, in Hasinai lands. Cabello y Robles also created a monthly mail service, which communicated Texas and the Provincias Internas (Internal Provinces). In 1786, Pedro Vial was appointed as leader of an expedition to find a direct route between the capital de Texas and Santa Fe, New Mexico. Cabello ended his term on December 3, 1786.

== Later years ==
Shortly after he abandoned the legislation in Texas, farmers delivered a memorial against Cabello, accusing him of setting unfair rules and forbidden them to use the unbranded cattle. They also accused him of having misappropriated funds. Cabello was very criticized, but he was highly regarded by the king. He did not learn of the charges against him until 1790. Nonetheless, between 1787 and 1795, he occupied other highlight military and politician charges: so, he was governor of Cuba (1789-1790), lieutenant of king in the garrison of the Havana and deputy inspector of troops of Cuba, and in 1797 he became a Field Marshal of the Spanish army.
