= Rafael Martínez Pacheco =

27th Governor of the Spanish Colony of Texas
- In office 1786–1790
- Preceded by: Bernardo Bonavía y Zapata
- Succeeded by: Manuel Muñoz

Rafael Martínez Pacheco was a military officer who served as governor of the Spanish province of Texas from 1786 to 1790 and as commander of the Presidio of San Agustín de Ahumada in 1763.

== Biography ==
Pacheco's events prior to 1759 are unknown, although it is known that he mentioned to the Viceroy of New Spain, Don Agustín de Ahumada, that he had collaborated with the military man Diego Ortiz Parrilla in sending a group of families from the Presidio of San Francisco Xavier de Gigedo, which was located near the San Marcos River, to San Saba, Texas in 1757. So, the presidio was rebuilt in San Saba. He also provided provisions and horses to the soldiers of the Presidio of San Antonio de Béjar and to their relatives. In 1759, Pacheco said to the viceroy he wanted to obtain a politician or military charge in Texas. To convince him, he spoke of on his collaboration with Parrilla in the aforementioned event. Thus, Pacheco obtained the command of the Presidio of San Agustín de Ahumada, on the lower Trinity River, on November 23, 1763. However, Pacheco's work at the Presidio was criticized by the governor of the province, Ángel de Martos y Navarrete, who was not even informed of Pacheco's policies. Navarrete then ordered Pacheco's suspension from office, that the San Agustin de Ahumada presidio be moved to Los Horconcitos region, and Pacheco's arrest. Navarrete assigned Marcos Ruiz to remove Pacheco from his command of the presidio. Ruiz burned the presidio and Pacheco's house. Pacheco then left the region and moved to the cities of La Bahía and San Antonio, Texas. In 1765, Hugo Oconór traveled to San Antonio to investigate the incident. After the investigation, O'Connor cleared Pacheco and allowed him to return to the presidio. Although, O'Conor imprisoned Ruiz.

Thus, on September 28, 1769, Pacheco began administering the Presidio de Trinidad. However, in the fall of that year the commandant was accused of settling several families of European origin (English, German, and Cajun) in Natchitoches, which was a French post. These families had come to Texas because their ship had been shipwrecked near its coast, specifically near La Bahía. In 1770, Pacheco was forced to abandon the presidio and marched to La Bahía, where he commanded the Presidio of Nuestra Señora de Loreto.

On November 8, 1772, Pacheco denounced in a document his bad experience with the governors and presidio commanders of the province, whom he accused of being incompetent and greedy. Pacheco assumed the government of Texas on December 5, 1786, as interim governor. In 1789, at the end of his administration, Pacheco participated in Juan de Ugalde's military campaign against the Apache people, where he was nearly killed by a Lipan Apache tribe in San Antonio. He was replaced by Manuel Muñoz as governor of Texas on October 18, 1790.
