= Ángel de Martos y Navarrete =

22rd Governor of Spanish Coahuila
- In office 1757–1759
- Preceded by: Miguel de Sesman y Escudero
- Succeeded by: Jacinto de Barrios y Jáuregui

22rd Governor of the Spanish Colony of Texas
- In office February 6, 1759 – 1766
- Preceded by: Jacinto de Barrios y Jáuregui
- Succeeded by: Hugo Oconór

Personal details
- Born: 1716
- Died: Unknown

Ángel de Martos y Navarrete was governor of the Spanish provinces of Coahuila (1757–1759) and Texas (1759–1766). His administration in Texas was characterised by a high degree of corruption, which led him to undergo trials and various sanctions (a high fine and his exclusion from any future public office).

== Early years ==
Navarrete grew up in a family with a military tradition, which may have favoured his incorporation into the Armada Real (Royal Navy) in 1731. He held the rank of Marine Guard of the navy. In the 1730s he participated in the military campaigns of Italy and Algeria and was promoted to lieutenant. So, he was a naval lieutenant.

== Administration of Texas ==
He was appointed governor of Texas on August 21, 1756. At that time, the previous governor, Jacinto de Barrios y Jáuregui, was still busy building the Presidio of San Agustín de Ahumada, on the lower Trinity River. Therefore, Navarrete could only begin his administration in the province on February 6, 1759. During the intervening period he governed Coahuila (in present-day Mexico), for whose government Jáuregui had just been appointed.

Shortly after beginning his rule in Texas, in October 1759, Navarrete found that various Amerindian tribes were attacking the Spanish settlements in Texas. To stop these, Navarrete sent troops from various presidios (Coahuila, San Luis Potosí, Nuevo Santander, Charcas and Nuevo León, as well as those from San Antonio and of the Apache lands) against the rebel tribes, although he did not manage to defeat them until 1760. In addition, Navarrete wanted to "modify" various missions of Texas, but the friars rejected such an idea.

The Navarrete government was permeated by a high level of corruption. Navarrete obtained the supplies, on which the presidios of Texas depended, from the French possession of Natchitoches. He bought the goods to the soldiers in the foreign presidio, sold them to the soldiers of the presidios of Texas and got important commissions. This provided him with a considerable amount of capital, which reached 1,000%. In addition to all this, Navarrete paid little attention to the garrison of Los Adaes, whose equipment had been damaged, and had managed to get the Native Americans of Los Adaes, where he lived, to work for him. Added to all this is the fact that, despite being captain of the San Antonio presidio, which was the main presidio in Texas, he had his residence, as already mentioned, in Los Adaes.

Furthermore, on November 23, 1763, Navarrete had a conflict with Rafael Martínez Pacheco, commander of the Presidio of San Agustín de Ahumada: Navarrete criticized his work in presidio and, furthermore, he did not receive any information from Pacheco about the policies developed by the latter. Because of this, Navarrete ordered Pacheco's replacement from his position, that the San Agustin de Ahumada presidio be moved to the Los Horconcitos region, and Pacheco's imprisonment. Navarrete sent one of his soldiers, Lieutenant Marcos Ruíz to the presidio to force Martínez to leave it. However, Ruíz decided to surround the presidio with his soldiers. Pacheco did not want to leave the presidio and attacked Ruíz's troops with a cannon. After this, the governor decided to end his confrontation with Martínez and ordered the presidio to be set on fire in order to force Pacheco out of it to be able to capture him. Thus, Pacheco left the presidio for La Bahía and San Antonio. Subsequently, he traveled to Mexico City to have his case studied.

In 1767, Hugo Oconór traveled to San Antonio, Texas to begin his administration and investigate the problems that had occurred during Navarrete's government. Oconór's investigation concluded with Pacheco's exoneration, who was allowed to return to the presidio. That's because research showed that he had no connection with the charges against him.

Therefore, the Viceroy of New Spain, Carlos Francisco de Croix, ordered an investigation with respect to Navarrete. The investigation was carried out by the inspector of border presidios Marqués de Rubí (who, among other functions, was to solve economic abuses in the territories of New Spain). He discovered all the corruption that Navarrete had carried out during his government, which caused the viceroy to remove Navarrete from his post as governor and replace him with Hugo Oconór in 1767.

Navarrete was prosecuted for fourteen years due to smuggling and the burning of the presidio. When the trial came to an end, the former governor was sentenced to pay a “heavy fine”, while at the same time losing all rights to hold another public office.
