= Jacinto de Barrios y Jáuregui =

Spanish soldier and governor

Governor of Texas
- In office 1751–1759
- Preceded by: Pedro del Barrio Junco y Espriella
- Succeeded by: Ángel de Martos y Navarrete

Governor of Coahuila (1st time)
- In office February 1759 – September 10 of 1762
- Preceded by: Ángel de Martos y Navarrete
- Succeeded by: Lorenzo Cancio Sierra y Cienfuegos

Governor of Coahuila (2nd time)
- In office December 10 of 1765 – February 6 of 1768
- Preceded by: Diego Ortiz Parrilla
- Succeeded by: José Costilla y Terán

Personal details
- Born: Cádiz, Andalusia, Spain
- Profession: Military and Governor of Coahuila and Texas

Jacinto de Barrios Leal y Jáuregui was a Spanish soldier who served as Governor of the Province of Coahuila (1759–1762; 1765–1768) and Texas (1751–1759).

== Career ==
Jacinto de Barrios Leal y Jáuregui was a native of Cádiz in Andalusia, Spain.

Around the year 1718, Jacinto started to serve the Spanish Crown as a soldier and participated in the wars between the Spain and Italia. In these wars, Barrios reached the position of Lieutenant Colonel of cavalry.

He was appointed governor and Captain General of Texas in 1751, arriving to the province in June of that year. Shortly after, in that year, three Frenchmen were found to have settled along the Trinity River to trade with the Native Americans. The Spanish authorities arrested and expelled them from the colony.

During his government, the Mission Santa Cruz de San Sabá and the Presidios of San Agustín de Ahumada and San Sabá were established. In addition, the San Xavier mission and San Francisco Xavier Presidio were transferred to the vicinity of San Marcos River. Barrios chose his lieutenant governor, Bernardo de Miranda, to lead an expedition to the modern Hill Country with the aim of finding some silver mines he had heard were there.

In 1756, Barrios was appointed governor of Coahuila by the Viceroy of New Spain, while his partner, Angel Martos y Navarrete, was elect to govern Texas. Both decided move to those territories later to that Barrios could finish the construction the Presidio of San Agustín de Ahumada, on the eastern bank of the Trinity River, and establish a settlement in the near places to presidio.

However, Barrios was a controversial governor. He traded with the staff of the French post of Natchitoches, Louisiana, which was illegal (residents in Spanish America could not trade with foreigners). He bought furs and other products at the post and sold the leathers to the indigenous population near the place. So he traded with Native American peoples such as the Bidais and Orcoquizas, through a control of indigenous industry, which made him a great fortune. Its practice of smuggling became Barrios in a very criticized figure in Texas, being the most criticized governor of the province (in this time, Texas was a province). He ended his term in Texas in 1759, after of finishing his work at San Agustín de Ahumada.

In that year he left Texas and moved to Coahuila to fulfill his duties as governor. He governed the province from February 1759 until September 10, 1762. Later, he was reappointed on December 10, 1765, finishing his term on February 6, 1768.
