= Francisco García Larios =

19th Governor of the Spanish Colony of Texas
- In office 1744–1748
- Preceded by: Justo Boneo y Morales
- Succeeded by: Pedro del Barrio Junco y Espriella

Personal details
- Profession: Politician

Francisco García Larios was the Governor of Texas from 1744 to 1748.

== Career ==
García Larios was appointed governor ad interim of Texas in 1744, after the death of Justo Boneo y Morales. During his term, the San Antonio Missions were still being carried out, as was reported by the inspector of the Queretaran missions Fr. Francisco Javier Ortiz. He planned to explore the Gulf Coast, "as far south as the Rios Grande". He considered the possibilities of establishing settlements and to search for French traders trading there (trade in Spanish America of not Spanish people was prohibited). Instead, he ordered a subordinate, Joaquín Prudencio de Orobio y Basterra, to do so, beginning in January 1747.

In addition, accepting orders from the viceroy, García ordered the Franciscans to found the San Xavier missions in the modern Milam County, Texas, despite their initial refusal to establish them there, because the location chosen was not the most appropriate to carry out a mission.

Also in 1747, the Spanish government sent José de Escandón to investigate the Spanish colonies in North America. Escandón appointed to Presidio La Bahia's captain, Joaquín de Orobio y Basterra, to evaluate South Texas. Following Orobio's report, Escandon said that La Bahia should be taken from Guadalupe River to the banks of the San Antonio River to help the settlements along the Rio Grande. Both the presidio and the mission likely were moved in October 1749. He also said that the migration of native families from other parts of New Spain (from areas now belonging to Mexico) to the presidio should be encouraged to create a colony there. However, no Mexicans who would want to settle in the presidio could be found. García Larios left Governorship of Texas in 1748.
