= José Antonio de Ecay Múzquiz =

Spanish explorer, soldier and official (1660–1738)

8th Governor of Texas and 7th of Coahuila
- In office 1716–1717
- Preceded by: Juan Valdez
- Succeeded by: Martín de Alarcón

Personal details
- Born: 1660 Monclova, Coahuila, modern-day Mexico
- Died: 1738 (aged 77–78) Monclova, Coahuila
- Profession: Soldier and political

José Antonio de Ecay-Múzquiz Vera (c. 1660 - 1738) was an explorer, soldier and official in the service of the Crown of Castile, known for his performance as interim governor of the New Spain provinces of Coahuila and Texas and as mayor of Monclova, Coahuila, as well as for his command of the presidio of San Juan Bautista del Río Grande. He was a relative of Melchor Múzquiz, 5th president of Mexico.

== Birth and Family ==
Múzquiz was born in the city of Monclova, in Coahuila (present-day Mexico). The son of Antonio Ecay-Múzquiz Urrutia (born in 1660) and Vicenta Vera, he was probably the brother of José Francisco Joaquín Ecay-Múzquiz Vera. Múzquiz Vera was the grandfather of the future president of Mexico Melchor Múzquiz. Although some sources indicate that Múzquiz Vera, rather than his brother, could have been his son.

== Career ==
=== Diego Ramón Expedition ===
Provinces of Coahuila and Texas

In 1707, Múzquiz accompanied the former governor of Coahuila and commander of the presidio of San Juan Bautista del Río Grande Diego Ramón on his journey from the presidio to the Nueces River, in Texas. Múzquiz took with him the troops that garrisoned the aforementioned presidio since they were to punish the rebellious indigenous peoples of the area, who often attacked them, and to search for, recruit, and send to the missions of San Juan Bautista the indigenous people who had recently converted to Christianity. Múzquiz was also responsible for signing the report prepared regarding the trip to the Nueces River.

=== Political Activity ===
==== Governorship of Coahuila and Texas ====
In 1717, Múzquiz was appointed interim governor of the provinces of Coahuila and Texas, when both provinces were governed from Monclova. However, his administration did not have the support of everyone, as he rejected the requests of certain religious leaders. Thus, when the Franciscan Antonio de Olivares asked him for an escort to protect him on his journey to San Antonio de Béxar in Texas, where he wanted reestablish the mission of San Francisco Solano (Alamo Mission), Múzquiz denied his request.

Location of the presidio of San Juan Bautista del Río Grande

His administration as governor was brief, and a few months after taking office, on August 5 of the same year (1717), he was replaced by Martín de Alarcón.

==== Command of the Presidio of San Juan Bautista del Río Grande and Mayor of Monclova ====
His collaboration with Diego Ramón in his expedition to the Nueces River was successful, since after Ramón's death in 1724, Múzquiz took his place as commander of the Presidio of San Juan Bautista del Río Grande. Likewise, during 1726 and 1727 he served as mayor of Monclova, while continuing in command of the presidio. As a key figure in the prison, he continued to assist in the province's expeditions.

=== Last expeditions ===
==== Berroterán Expedition and Canary Islands Colonization ====
In 1729 Muzquiz collaborated with the commander of the presidios of Mapimí and Rio Conchos, in Chihuahua, José de Berroterán to form the expedition towards the Junta de los Ríos, advancing through the Río Grande; while in 1731 he sent a troop from San Juan Bautista to the settlers of the Canary Islands, who had just arrived in Coahuila, to protect them until they reached San Antonio, where they were to form the first Spanish colony.

==== Garza-Falcón Expedition ====
In 1735, he joined the expedition of the governor of the province, Blas de la Garza Falcón, on his journey up the Rio Grande, where they were searching for the precise location to establish a new presidio. In 1737 Múzquiz received a request to participate in the trial of the newly ex-governor of Texas, Carlos Benites Franquis de Lugo, who was tried in San Juan Bautista. Muzquiz testified against him. During the same time, he had to serve as an officer of a developing Coahuila mission, the so-called San Francisco Vizarrón, replacing the governor of the province Clemente de la Garza Falcón, son of Blas de la Garza Falcón.

In October 1737 he participated in an audiencia, this time in the role of judge, held regarding complaints directed at the missions of San Juan Bautista, which had not paid the tithes which, by law, they were required to pay.

== Death and Succession ==
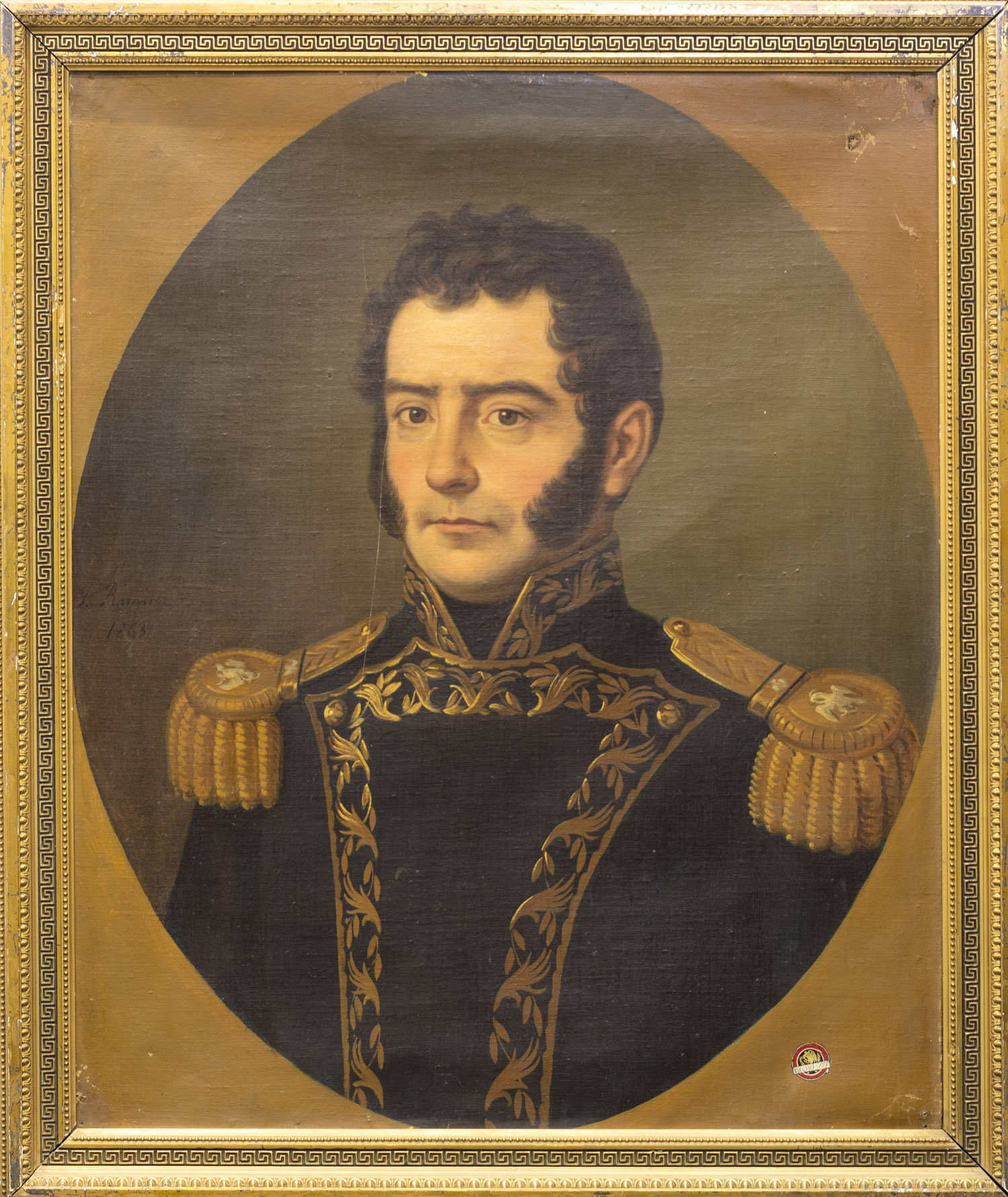
Portrait of General Melchor Múzquiz, 5th President of Mexico

However, Múzquiz was unable to see the resolution of the conflict because he died in 1738, while it was still unfolding. Thus, he was succeeded in command by Don José Hernández de Montemayor, who had served as his lieutenant in charge of the presidio troops on the Berroterán expedition.

== Marriage and Issues ==
He married Ramona Aldonza Martínez-Guajardo Guerra at the end of the 17th century and Francisca Javiera Flores de Valdés Bosque in 1704.

With the first, he had only one son: José Miguel Ecay-Múzquiz Martínez-Guajardo, born in 1698. With the second, he had a large family:

- María Rosa Ecay-Múzquiz Flores de Valdés, born in 1708
- Isabel Ecay-Múzquiz Flores de Valdés, born in 1710
- Francisca Javiera Ecay-Múzquiz Flores de Valdés, born in 1711
- María Gertrudis Ecay-Múzquiz Flores de Valdés, born in 1713
- María Josefa Ecay-Múzquiz Flores de Valdés, born in 1715
- Melchora Ecay-Múzquiz Flores de Valdés, born in 1717
- Francisco Joaquín Ecay-Múzquiz Flores de Valdés, born in 1719
- Pedro José Ecay-Múzquiz Flores de Valdés, born in 1722
- Ana María Ecay-Múzquiz Flores de Valdés, born in 1726
- It is unknown whether José Joaquín de Ecay-Múzquiz y Vera, a lieutenant in the Spanish Navy, was also his son or his brother.
