= Juan Agustín Morfi =

Spanish Franciscan friar (1735–1783)

Juan Agustín Morfi (Asturias, Spain, in 1735 – Mexico, New Spain, 1783) was a Spanish Franciscan friar. He is considered the most important chronicler and historian of the New Philippines; (Note: "se trata del principal historiador y cronista de la provincia de Nuevas Filipinas") Mariano Errasti ranks Morfi among the most prodigious figures in five centuries of Franciscan work in America.

== Early life ==
Born in Oviedo, his exact date of birth is not known, but his admission document into the Convento Grande de San Francisco in Mexico in 1760 records he was 25 at the time, indicating a birth date around 1735. His parents were Juan Morfi, an Irishman, and Maria Antonia Cortina, a Spaniard. He had siblings, but nothing else is known of them with certainty. He arrived in America between 1755 and 1756. He was ordained a Franciscan friar on May 3, 1761.

== Career ==
Morfi taught theology at the Colegio de Santa Cruz de Tlatelolco and later at the Convento Grande. He was appointed Chaplain to Teodoro de Croix's 1777-1778 expedition through the Provincias Internas in the north of New Spain. In 1782 he was elected Guardián of the Convento Grande.

== Intellectual life ==
Morfi's personal library at his death comprised over a hundred manuscripts and over a hundred books, over eighty of which he had ordered from Spain. He carried forty books during his travels with de Croix.

He consulted at least 200 government and Franciscan documents, from 70 different authors, and he added his keen observations to frankly chronicle life in northern New Spain. He wrote in 1782, for instance, that the Hopi of the Rio Grande were better off, despite having maintained independence from Spanish rule, than other tribes which had not.

== Death ==
He died at 48 years of age on October 20, 1783 at the same Convento Grande de San Francisco where he was ordained.

== Written works ==
- Tractus de Fide, Spe, et Charitate, 1766
- Relación geográfica e histórica de la provincia de Texas o Nuevas Filipinas, 1673-1779. Translated by Carlos Castañeda as "History of Texas: 1673-1779. By fray Juan Agustin Morfi. Missionary, Teacher, Historian". 2 volumes, Albuquerque, 1935
- Memorias para la historia de Texas o Nuevas Filipinas
- Viaje de Indios y Diario del Nuevo México
- Diario y derrotero, 1771-1781
- La seguridad del patrocinio de María Santísima de Guadalupe. México, 1772
- Diálogos sobre la elocuencia en general y sobre la del Púlpito en particular del señor Arzobispo de Cambrai con la Carta de éste sobre la Poesía y la Historia. 2 volumes, Madrid, 1795

== Surviving sermons ==
- To the Virgin of Guadalupe (1772)
- La nobleza y piedad de los Montañeses (1775)
