= Hugo O'Conor =

Military governor of northern Mexico

23rd Governor of the Spanish Colony of Texas
- In office 1767–1770
- Preceded by: Ángel de Martos y Navarrete
- Succeeded by: Juan María Vicencio

Governor of Yucatan
- In office 1777–1779

Personal details
- Born: Hugh O'Conor; 1732 Dublin, Kingdom of Ireland
- Died: March 8, 1779 (aged 46–47) Mérida, Captaincy General of Yucatán, New Spain, Spanish Empire
- Known for: Founder of Tucson, Arizona

Military service
- Allegiance: Spain
- Branch/service: (Spain) Spanish Army
- Rank: Brigadier General

Hugh O'Conor (1732 — March 8, 1779), better known by his Spanish name Hugo O'Conor, was a military governor of northern Mexico. He was appointed governor of Texas by the Spanish viceroy of New Spain in 1767. It is recorded that O'Conor rode well over 10,000 miles (16,000 km) on horseback in the course of conducting his duties. O'Conor was called "The Red Captain" by the Apache, both for the color of his hair and his formidable military leadership.

O'Conor was the founding father of the city of Tucson, Arizona, having authorized the construction of a military fort in that location in 1775. In 1777, O'Conor requested, due to his failing health, to be transferred to the Yucatan Peninsula, whereupon he was promoted to brigadier general and appointed Governor of Yucatan Peninsula. He served there until his death in 1779.

== Biography ==
Hugh O'Conor was born in 1732 in Dublin, Kingdom of Ireland, into the Gaelic-Irish aristocratic O'Conor Don Family. He was a descendant of Toirdhealbhach Mór Ua Conchobhair, King of Connacht and High King of Ireland. Because of the Penal Laws which restricted the political, religious and commercial rights of Irish Catholics, O'Conor left his homeland and moved to Spain where his cousins Alexander (Alejandro) and Dominic O'Reilly were serving as officers in the Spanish Royal Army. He was established in Aragon.

In his youth he joined the regiment of Volunteers of Aragon, eventually acquiring the title of major. During his years in the military, he was sent to Cuba and Mexico City. There he distinguished himself by his ability as a military strategist and was appointed captain for Mexico's Northern Territory to exercise dominion in the region.

He went to Texas to investigate a dispute around San Agustín de Ahumada Presidio between Governor Ángel de Martos y Navarrete and Rafael Martínez Pacheco (future governor of Texas). It was at this time that he obtained the title of inspector general of the Provincias Internas (general inspector of the Interior Provinces). Later, in 1767, he was appointed governor of Texas, in replacement of Martos y Navarrete. When he took office, he found that one of its major cities, San Antonio, was shattered by frequent attacks of several Indian tribes. Therefore, the new governor set up a garrison at Los Adaes to protect the city.

In 1771, he became commander of the Chihuahua frontier and on January 20, 1773, he was appointed commandant inspector of presidios under the office of Coronel. He and Governor Juan María Vicencio de Ripperdá rejected the petition of Antonio Gil Y'Barbo that the settlers could return to their original homes. To strengthen the protection of Nueva Vizcaya, Coahuila, Sonora, Mexico he decided to expel the Apaches in the region, making war against these peoples in 1775 and 1776. Many Apaches died in the war. The Apaches who survived fled to more western areas. In 1777, he suffered a serious illness and was sent to the Yucatan Peninsula, with the title of governor and brigadier general of the Mexican province, which was a lesser charge to that which he usually occupied. He died on March 8, 1779, at Quinta de Miraflores, in Mérida, Yucatán.

== Legacy ==
In modern English translation, the order that founded the fort at what is now Tucson read as follows.

San Xavier del Bac.

August 20, 1775

"I, Hugo O'conor, knight of the order of Calatrava, colonel of infantry in His Majesty's armies and commandant inspector of the frontier posts of New Spain

Certify that having conducted the exploration prescribed in Article three of the New Royal Regulation of Presidios issued by His Majesty on the tenth of September 1772 for the moving of the company of San Ignacio de Tubac in the Province of Sonora, I selected and marked out in the presence of Father Francisco Garces and Lieutenant Juan de Carmona a place known as San Agustin del Tucson as the new site of the Presidio. It is situated at a distance of eighteen leagues from Tubac, fulfills the requirements of water, pasture, and wood and effectively closes the Apache frontier. The designation of the New Presidio becomes official with the signatures of myself, Father Francisco Garces, and Lieutenant Juan de Carmona, at this mission of San Xavier del Bac, on this twentieth day of August of the year 1775."

Hugo O'conor
Fray Francisco Garces
Juan Fernandez Carmona

== See also ==
- List of Texas Governors and Presidents
- Presidio San Augustin del Tucson
- Irish military diaspora
