= Bernardo Bonavía y Zapata =

Spanish soldier and political figure

Bernardo Bonavia y Zapata

26th Governor of the Spanish Colony of Texas
- In office 1786–1786
- Preceded by: Domingo Cabello y Robles
- Succeeded by: Rafael Martínez Pacheco

Personal details
- Born: 1740 Toro, Spain
- Died: December 2, 1812 (aged 71–72) Oaxaca, New Spain, Spanish Empire
- Profession: Governor of Texas (1786), Governor - Intendant of Durango (in the modern Mexico, 1796 - 1809), corregidor in Mexico and military commander of Texas (1809 - 1812).

Bernardo Bonavía y Zapata (1740 – December 2, 1812) was a Spanish soldier and political figure who was in a variety of political positions in New Spain. The positions included Corregidor of a Mexican province (1789), Governor-Intendant of Durango (Appointed by the Spanish monarchy; 1796–1809), and Military Commander of Texas (1809-1812). He was also a Caballero de Alcántara. He was appointed the Governor of Texas in 1786, but he did not accept the position because he was busy in administrative roles in other places. During his political administration in New Spain, Bonavía promoted the liberalization of trade and commerce under the orders of Charles III, King of Spain.

== Biography ==
Bernardo Bonavía y Zapata was born in Toro, in the province of Zamora (Castile and León, Spain), to Bonifacio María Bonavía, a field Marshal, and Ramona Zapata. He had one sister, called Margarita Bonavia. Following in his father's footsteps, he became a "Mariscal de Campo de los Reales Ejércitos," a field Marshal in Spain's Royal Army. In 1758, he began his political career under the King of Spain. On August 25, 1789, Bonavía was appointed Corregidor and Intendant "of a Mexican province". Later, in 1796, he was appointed by the King of Spain Governor - Intendant of Durango (in modern Mexico). He maintained that position until 1809, when he was appointed Commanding officer of Texas. Upon arrival in Texas he asked all senior officials to submit writings showing their own views about the protection and development of Texas.

Fear of possible attacks on Texas from neighbouring Louisiana led Zapata to ask the Commanding General of the Provincias Internas (Interior Provinces) Nemesio Salcedo y Salcedo the strengthening of those Texas defence structures located between the two regions. In addition, Zapata brought together the governors of several provinces in New Spain (particularly of Coahuila, Nuevo León, and Texas) to study new measures that would lead to the "development" of the province. The governor presented the measures linked to "free trade and immigration" in Texas to Salcedo y Salcedo on June 28. He also established "liberal reforms" on the orders of Charles III of Spain in the commerce sector, mainly in Texas.

On July 20, 1809, Zapata initiated another meeting to discuss the creation of a line of communication between his province and Veracruz by following the causes of the rivers that unite both regions, in addition to establishing a port in San Bernard River that would facilitate free trade. In addition, based on the decree of May 30, 1804, he also proposed that the Presidios of Texas should be divided into regiments. However, his proposals were rejected by Salcedo. In late 1810, an armed revolt broke out in Durango demanding the independence of New Spain from Spain, and Zapata had to repress the rebels. In 1812, he took part of the War of Independence of New Spain, leading the royalist troops in Oaxaca. He fought against the rebel troops of Miguel Hidalgo y Costilla. However, his troops were defeated and Zapata was captured. His death is disputed: he may have been murder by the soldiers of Costilla on December 2, 1812, or he could have died much later, on 18 April 1833, with 93 years old.
