= Manuel de Sandoval =

Neomexican soldier and governor

15th Governor of Coahuila
- In office 4 February 1729 – 4 September 1733
- Preceded by: Blas de la Garza Falcón
- Succeeded by: Blas de la Garza Falcón

14th Governor of Spanish Texas
- In office 1734–1736
- Lieutenant: Jose Gonzales
- Preceded by: Juan Antonio Bustillo y Ceballos
- Succeeded by: Carlos Benites Franquis de Lugo

Personal details
- Born: Santa Fe, New Mexico, New Spain, Spanish Empire
- Died: Mexico City, New Spain, Spanish Empire
- Profession: Political and soldier

Manuel de Sandoval was a prominent Neomexican soldier who served as governor of Coahuila (1729–1733 ) and Texas (1734–1736). During his administration in Texas, he lived in and worked on the problems of Bexar, but he neglected Los Adaes, which was the capital of Texas. He served to control French expansion and prevent it from reaching Texas. Under his administration, the French commander Louis Juchereau de St. Denis transferred a French presidio from Louisiana to Texas, which led to Sandoval being expelled from the government and replaced. Sandoval was accused of several charges linked to his administration, which took him to prison and to pay a fine equivalent to 500 dollars.

== Biography ==
=== Early years ===
Manuel de Sandoval was born in Santa Fe, New Mexico, in the second half of the 17th century, but the exact date of his birth is unknown. In 1707, he joined the army of Santa Fe. He showed great military capabilities and he became the captain of the grenadiers of the regiment of Santa Fe. Sandoval was part of the army for over twenty years. On February 4, 1729, the Viceroy of New Spain, Vizarrón y Eguiarreta, appointed him governor of Coahuila (today a state in Mexico). He finished his term as governor of that province on September 4, 1733.

=== Administration of Texas ===
In early 1734, following his services to Coahuila, he was chosen as governor of Texas by the Viceroy. This appointment was because of both the viceroy's confidence in him and that his military capabilities would enable him to repress the Apaches, who were raiding San Fernando de Bexar (modern San Antonio, Texas).

During his administration, he lived mainly in Bexar. This was slightly unusual as Los Adaes was the provincial capital of Texas at the time. He promoted a war against the Apaches to repress them and helped settlers from the Canary Islands, who had emigrated to Bexar in 1731. In addition, he was "to keep an eye on the French" to inform the viceroy if he perceived that they were transferring some of their presidios to Texas. However, Sandoval neglected Los Adaes, whose soldiers did not receive their monthly pay and whose fort suffered damage that needed to be repaired. In addition, at the end of 1735, the population of Los Adaes suffered a major famine due to the poor corn harvest that year, with many people falling ill and dying. On the other hand, the poverty of the population of the presidio was such that the soldiers of the region wore leather clothing, particularly deer, while women and children lacked of clothing, which led a revolt at the presidio. So, Lieutenant Governor Jose Gonzales (appointed by Sandoval for administer Los Adaes) wrote the governor about the above-mentioned problems to that he solve them and repress the revolt.

In 1735, the commander of Natchitoches' French fort, Louis Juchereau de St. Denis, decided to take advantage of Sandoval's stay in Bexar. St. Denis transferred the aforementioned fortification, which was located on the Texas border, to the eastern part of the Spanish province. Both the Viceroy and the Government of Texas perceived the establishment of a French fort in Texas as an aggressive move by the French, and the beginning of a French colonization in the region. Sandoval and Jose Gonzales criticized the transfer of the fort to Texas, but they did not succeed in having the fort removed.

In September 1736, Vizarrón y Eguiarreta, who was upset by the situation, ordered Sandoval to leave the Texas government, becoming Carlos Benites Franquis de Lugo the new governor of the province.

=== Repercutions and last years ===
After Franquis de Lugo came into power, he ordered the imprisonment of Sandoval, accusing him of "seven counts of official misconduct" (amongst them, financial misappropriation). In 1737 the Viceroy ordered Sandoval to show his "official accounts" and, therefore, how he conducted the financial policy while governed Texas. Sandoval was found not guilty of the above charges, but was accused of not keeping correct book-keeping practices of his administration and for not having lived at Los Adaes when he was governor of the province. For both, he was ordered to pay a significant amount of pesos (the equivalent to $500) and imprisoned. He spent several years in prison and got his freedom in 1741. After leaving prison, he continued to hold military positions.

From this moment on, he lived in Mexico City for the rest of his life. There, Sandoval joined the "Regimento Urbano del Comercio" (Urban Regimental of Commerce), where he managed to occupy the rank of sergeant major. He held this position until the end of his life.

== Sandoval Case ==
Research conducted on the Sandoval Case was extensive and covered some thirty volumes. In addition, another forty volumes of information was elaborated on the events that had occurred in Texas in a period prior to Sandoval's administration. This material is important because, in the early 19th century, it was used by the great powers (Spain, France & the United States) to negotiate their domains on eastern frontier of the province.
