= José María Cantú =

9th Governor of Coahuila and Texas
- In office March 12, 1835 – March 24, 1835
- Preceded by: Juan José Elguézabal
- Succeeded by: José Rafael Eça y Múzquiz

Personal details
- Profession: Political

José María Cantú was the interim governor of the Mexican state Coahuila and Texas in 1835 and mayor of Monclova in 1839.

== Biography ==
Cantú was a resident of Monclova, the capital of Coahuila and Texas. In 1835 he was appointed interim governor of that state by the local congress. He assumed office on March 12 of that year. However, he only held his governorship until the 24th of the same month, when he signed a decree that allowed the State Executive to sell large portions of land. The purpose of the sale was to obtain the capital necessary to solve the economic shortage in which public funds were found at that time.

However, Cantú's decision was rejected by the commander-in-chief of the Eastern Internal States, Martín Perfecto de Cos. Thus, Cos did not allow the decree to be carried out. For that reason, Cantú resigned from his position as governor, being replaced by Ramón Muzquiz. Several years later, in 1839, he served as mayor of his native Monclova.
