= Tejano South Texas =

2002 non-fiction book by Daniel D. Arreola

Tejano South Texas: A Mexican American Cultural Province is a 2002 non-fiction book by Daniel D. Arreola, published by the University of Texas Press. It discusses the South Texas region and Mexican American culture within the region.

Arreola includes photographs, multiple maps, as well as diagrams. Arreola describes South Texas as being distinct from other Mexican American areas. There is a chapter on social identities where Arreola elaborates on this.

== Background ==
Arreola's field is cultural geography.

== Contents ==
The methods of the cultural geography field are in the first chapter. Academic definitions of South Texas are in the second chapter. The history prior to 1900 and colonization are in the third. The demography and the region in the 20th century are in the fourth. The physical features including neighborhoods and ranches that are unique to South Texas are documented in the fifth. The sixth chapter documents life in South Texan small towns and the style's origins in Spain. The seventh chapter documents the cities of Laredo and San Antonio. Culture and self-identity are documented in chapters 8 and 9.

== Reception ==
Carlos Kevin Blanton of Texas A&M University praised the book for being "well informed by history"; he had some criticisms that he described as "minor". Blanton argued the book should have documented more of the influence from "Anglo" (non-Hispanic white) people and clarified how race is a fluid concept.

Susan Hardwick of the University of Oregon stated that the book was "critically successful" and that it had "high quality".

Scholar John H. Barnhill stated "This work is excellent."

Michael S. Yoder of Texas A&M International University wrote that the book is "suitable" for university studies and that it is "an excellent example of the interdisciplinary appeal of cultural geography[...]".

== See also ==
- History of Mexican Americans in Texas
