= Manuel Pardo (governor) =

Spanish soldier and governor

37th Governor of the Spanish Colony of Texas
- In office March 20, 1817 – May 27, 1817
- Preceded by: Juan Ignacio Pérez
- Succeeded by: Antonio María Martínez

39th Governor of Coahuila
- In office 1819 – November 25, 1820
- Preceded by: José Franco
- Succeeded by: Antonio Elosúa

Personal details
- Born: 1774 Santander, Spain
- Died: Unknown
- Profession: Military and Governor of Texas (1818) and Coahuila (1819–20)

Manuel Pardo (1774–?) was a Spanish soldier who was the Interim Governor of the Province of Texas in 1817 and of Coahuila between 1819 and 1820. He participated in the Texas Revolution as the assistant to the Centralist Troops led by Martín Perfecto de Cos on the Mexican side.

== Career ==
Manuel Pardo was born in 1774, in Santander (Cantabria, Spain). He joined the Spanish Army in his youth and fought in the military campaigns of France (in 1795), Portugal (1801), Aranjuez and Madrid (both in 1802 in the Community of Madrid). Pardo later traveled to New Spain where he joined the army. He was promoted to colonel.

On March 20, 1817, Pardo was appointed Interim Governor of the Province of Texas and held the position until may of that year. Pardo's successor, Antonio María Martínez, claimed the interim Governor had impoverished Texas and depleted military defenses.

In 1819, Pardo was appointed Governor of Coahuila, replacing José Franco. He governed Coahuila until November 25, 1820.

In 1822, Pardo became political chief of Monclova, Coahuila, and, in 1835, in the Texas Revolution, he was assistant of the troops of Martín Perfecto de Cos in Monclova.
