= Antonio María Martínez =

38th Governor of the Spanish Colony of Texas
- In office March 27, 1817 – August 17, 1822
- Preceded by: Manuel Pardo
- Succeeded by: José Félix Trespalacios

Personal details
- Born: Unknown Andújar, province of Jaén, Spain
- Died: 1823 Mexico City, Mexico
- Profession: Military and Governor of Texas (1817 and 21)

Antonio María Martínez (died 1823) was a colonel in the infantry regiment of Zamora and the last governor of Spanish Texas.

== History ==
He was born in Andújar, province of Jaén, Spain. He entered military service on July 7, 1785, and had a distinguished career, winning the Cross of Northern Europe and the Cross of Germany on European battlefields. He assumed the political and military governorship of Spanish Texas on March 27, 1817.

By the summer of 1821, the Spanish regime was faced with disaster. Agustín de Iturbide was in possession of Mexico, and Martínez, at the request of the Baron de Bastrop, approved Moses Austin's petition for permission to bring 300 settlers into Texas. On July 18, 1821, Martínez was forced to issue orders requiring the oath of allegiance to Iturbide. After learning that José Félix Trespalacios had been appointed to succeed him, he surrendered his office peacefully on August 17, 1822.

Martínez returned to Mexico City and died there in November 1823.

== Bibliography ==
- Vito Alessio Robles, Coahuila y Texas en la época colonial (Mexico City: Editorial Cultura, 1938; 2d ed., Mexico City: Editorial Porrúa, 1978)
- Donald E. Chipman, Spanish Texas, 1519-1821 (Austin: University of Texas Press, 1992)
- Mattie Austin Hatcher, "Letters of Antonio Martínez, the Last Spanish Governor of Texas, 1817-1822," Southwestern Historical Quarterly 39 (July, October 1935, January, April 1936)
