= Nueva Extremadura =

Old name for two Spanish colonies, either in South America or the Rio Grande Valley

Nueva Extremadura means "New Extremadura" in Spanish, and originates from Extremadura, Spain.

Nueva Extremadura could refer to

- a large jurisdiction in the north of New Spain, bordered in the 17th century to its west and south by Nueva Vizcaya, by Nuevo León to its southeast; by Nuevo Santander to its east, and, to its northeast, by Louisiana. After 1722, its northeastern border was the New Philippines. Today many identify the state of Coahuila in Mexico with the former Nueva Extremadura, but the present state's borders are not the same. For example, Nueva Vizcaya occupied the southwest of present-day Coahuila; Nuevo León, the neighbor to the east, also had claims to eastern New Extremaduran lands; the border with the New Philippines was at the Medina river (near present-day San Antonio, in the U.S. state of Texas). From 1687, the territory's official name was Provincia de San Francisco de Coahuila y Nueva Extremadura.

Until about 1722 Nueva Extremadura covered areas north of the Nueces River east of the Medina River. In 1722 New Philippines was established east of the Medina River. Effective Spanish control in this region had only been established in about 1722 and only actually existed from about 1718 and mainly in the general vicinity of San Antonio. So Nueva Extremadura did include some areas in what is now Texas.

- the name originally given to Chile by Pedro de Valdivia. Its capital was then known as Santiago de Nueva Extremadura.

== See also ==
- History of Chile
  - Santiago de Chile
- History of Mexico
  - Coahuila y Tejas
  - Territorial evolution of Mexico
