= Carlos Benites Franquis de Lugo =

Spanish governor of Texas in 1736–1737

15ºGovernor of the Spanish Colony of Texas
- In office 1736–1737
- Preceded by: Manuel de Sandoval
- Succeeded by: Prudencio de Orobio y Basterra

Personal details
- Born: 1691 La Orotava, Tenerife Canary Islands, Spain
- Died: Unknown New Mexico or Spain, Spanish Empire
- Spouse: Ángela de Alarcón y Ocaña
- Profession: Political

Carlos Benites Franquis de Lugo (1691–?) was a Spanish governor of Texas between 1736 and 1737. He was a very critiqued governor. De Lugo favored the total or partial abandonment of several missions and accused the previous governor Manuel de Sandoval of criminal actions, so sent him to prison. Ultimately, his economic mismanagement of Texas led the province to near bankruptcy. However, he favored the distribution of river waters through the "dula".

== Biography ==
=== Early years ===
Franquis was born in La Orotava, Tenerife (Canary Islands, Spain). In 1736, he was chosen to govern Tlaxcala, in the modern Mexico, by Philip V. However, when Franquis reached the province, he learned that the position was not yet vacant, because his predecessor had not yet left his political office. Because Franquis could not take office, the Viceroy of New Spain made him the interim governor of Texas, since the previous governor, Manuel de Sandoval, had left the government of the province before the king had appointed a new governor.

On his trip to Texas, he passed through Monclova, in Coahuila, where he criticized the administration of Clemente de la Garza Falcón. Franquis questioned that Falcón was doing everything possible to defend the Spaniard populations from the Amerindians who were attacking the territory.

=== Governor of Texas ===
==== Upon arrival in Texas ====
On September 26, 1736 Franquis came to San Antonio to take office. However, De Lugo arrived to the city by surprise because he had not communicated his arrival beforehand and didn't even have an escort. In addition, when the authorities asked him to present his credentials he opposed, as he preferred them to rely on his word. On the other hand, he considered his authority over the Texas and Coahuila presidios similar to that of the king and viceroy, as he pointed out in Texas.

Shortly after he arrived in San Antonio, he conceded three lots of land to widows of military members and another two to military veterans.

==== Administration ====
Upon taking office, Franquis' economic mismanagement led the province to near bankruptcy.

In 1736, Franquis "appropriated" of many Native Americans of the missions and sent them to other places, where he forced them to work for him. However, many of them deserted to the forest and began to interact with the Native Americans of the region, which had never been Christianized because they had never lived in missions, and spoke them about the treatment they had been subjected to. The fact was reported to the Spanish Crown. The king, through a letter dated in March of this year, warned Franquis that he would be fined if he continued to send the indigenous from the missions to other places and indicated that the only legal way to dispose of them (out of the missions) was if the religious allowed him to.

In addition, Franquis opposed almost all the missionaries and Presidio officials working in the main regions of Texas and Coahuila (i.e. Los Adaes and Saltillo), causing disaffection between the governor and them. Franquis accused the friars of stealing "the royal treasure", besides insulting them, (Note: Curiously, one of the insults that De Lugo poured out against them was that of "Hijos de Satán" ("Sons of Satan"), even though this was a religious group, which served to the church. Other insults such as "alcahuetes" or "cornudos cabrones" (cuckold bastards) were also poured against them by De Lugo.) and preventing their letters from being sent because he appropriated them. In addition, he ordered the friars to fire most of the guards working on each mission. So, the guards were to be reduced from three to one per mission, even though they were very important to the missions because they contributed to the "maintaining of discipline", the "daily tasks" and to the search and recovery of the Amerindians who had escaped from the mentioned religious outposts, as well as to their punishment for having fled.

Franquis was apparently annoying for the supposed mistreatment that the missionaries were inflicting on indigenous of various regions, particularly those of La Concepción, San Juan Capistrano and La Espada, as he explained to the Viceroy of New Spain in a letter he send him in August 1737.

In April 1737, the governor ordered all the guards working in the missions to vacate them. Several month later, on June 8, 1737, San Francisco mission was abandoned and the 230 Native Americans who lived there got the freedom, (Note: Amerindians residing in the missions could not leave until they were fully cultured and, perhaps, had learned a profession.) while the other religious establishments had lost many Native Americans as well (including the San Juan Capristano mission, which was abandoned by most of the amerindians). Although the Viceroy ordered Franquis to return all the guards to the missions, he decided to ignore the order.

For instance, he ordered the construction of the first "dula" (a piece of land that receives irrigation from a ditch) for the distribution of rivers.

In 1737, Franquis took all the Sandoval's documents and accused him of criminal actions. Accused of "seven counts of official misconduct", Sandoval was later sent to prison.

Shortly thereafter, an investigation into the administration of Franquis took place, which ended on July 9, 1737.

=== Last years ===
After the investigation, Franquis was imprisoned, because he was accused of imposing an authoritarian system in Texas. In September 1737, he was expelled from his position as governor and sent to San Juan Bautista, in Nuevo Leon, but Franquis fled to Mexico City.

After submitting the official accounts of his government, Franquis was found not guilty in his trial. A little later, he settled in Veracruz, in the modern-day Mexico, and assumed the rank of officer of the garrison of that place. Finally, he returned to Spain and rejoined to the regiment of Savoy. The place and date of his death are not known, but it is thought that he died in Mexico or Spain.

== Personal life ==
When Franquis was young, he emigrated to Havana, Cuba, "where he married Ángela de Alarcón y Ocaña".
