= New Philippines =

Old name for Spanish-occupied central Texas and Louisiana (1722–1821)

New Spain in 1794, with its province of New Philippines to its northeast, in light orange, west of Spanish Louisiana, in purple

New Philippines (Spanish: Nuevas Filipinas or Nuevas Philipinas) was the abbreviated name (Note: "Nueva Filipinas, probably the abbreviated form") of a territory in New Spain. Its full and official name was Nuevo Reino de Filipinas. (Note: varias descripciones: [...] del Nuevo Reino de Filipinas)

Like other provinces, the territory was named after other existing dominions, in this case the Philippines, hence "New Philippines". The former were named after Philip II of Spain and the latter were named after the then-sovereign, King Philip V of Spain. New Philippines ceased to be a legal entity upon the extinction of New Spain in 1821.

== Limits ==
New Philippines Province overlapped in part with the current U.S. state of Texas, but its territory was substantially different. The land consisted of the region north of the Medina and Nueces rivers, in what is now South-Central Texas; i.e., only the Central-Northern part of the current state overlaps with the territory of New Philippines.

The Medina River was the official border between New Extremadura and New Philippines. West of the Medina headwaters, the southern border was with Nueva Vizcaya. The border with Nuevo Santander was the Nueces River.

To the west, New Philippines bordered Nueva Vizcaya and Nuevo México; to the north, the border almost reached the Red River; to the east, the border was consecutively French, Spanish, and finally American.

=== Disputed eastern border ===
France claimed its border extended west and south to the Rio Grande (thus entirely negating the existence of New Philippines); conversely, Spain claimed its east border extended to the Red River. The French founded Natchitoches in 1714 east of the Red River (later moving their post from the east to the west side of the river about 1734), and the Spanish founded Los Adaes in 1721 near present-day Robeline, Louisiana, only 12 miles (19 km) from Natchitoches. Informally, the border was set at the Arroyo Hondo, located between the French and the Spanish settlements, for the next 98 years. Following the 1819 Treaty of Adams-Onís, the New Spain and Louisiana border moved 45 miles (72 km) west to the Sabine River and remained there until the extinction of New Spain in 1821.

== History ==
In the 16th century, the northern frontier of New Spain was Nueva Vizcaya, beginning from 1531. As development increased in the 17th century, a new province was created on its east in 1687, namely, Nueva Extremadura, a very extensive territory at the time, now identified with the much smaller state of Coahuila, in Mexico.

In 1722, the northeast of Nueva Extremadura was politically detached and officially named Nuevo Reino de las Filipinas, also known by its short form, Nuevas Filipinas. The second Marqués de Aguayo was named governor of New Philippines.

=== Origins of the name ===
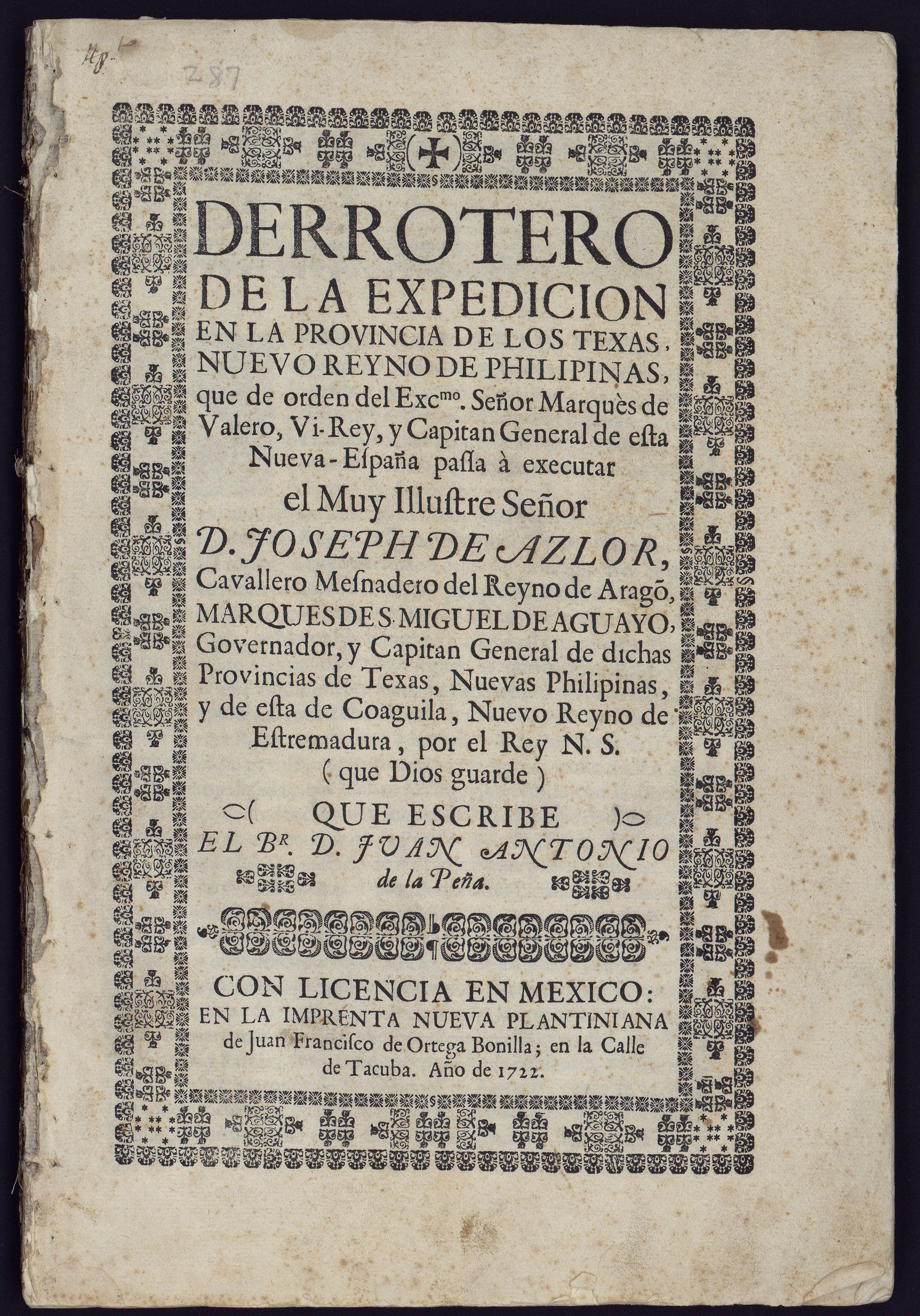
Cover page of the 1720-1722 expedition into the "Nuevo Reyno de Philipinas," a chronicle by Juan Antonio de la Peña

The name was first used by Antonio Margil in July 1716, during his participation in Domingo Ramón's expedition to prevent French expansion from Louisiana. (Note: "Antonio Margil de Jesús evidently first used the name Nuevas Filipinas in a letter to the viceroy dated July 20, 1716") Some sources say it was Ramón himself who used it first, followed by Margil on his July letter. (Note: "According to erudite sources, Domingo Ramón, a missionary-explorer first used it") The next record of the name is a letter written by Isidro de Espinosa in February 1718.

The name first appeared in an official document in 1718, in a letter addressed to Martín de Alarcón: A March 11, 1718 instruction letter for Alarcon's 1718 reinforcements expedition refers to "Nuevas Filipinas", (Note: «for the first time in an official document, refer to Texas as "Nuevas Filipinas"») differentiating New Philippines from the province of Coahuila and New Extremadura. In a report of his services to the Spanish government, Alarcón would go on to refer to himself as "governor and lieutenant captain general of the Province of the Texas and New Philippines." Alarcón signed the foundation document of the San Antonio de Valero mission, dating it May 1, 1718, in his capacity as "General of the Provinces of the Kingdom of New Philippines." Much later, the mission would be garrisoned and become the site of the 1836 Battle of the Alamo.

=== Use of the name in monographs and chronicles ===
Juan Antonio de la Peña, a participant in the Marqués de Aguayo expedition, wrote Derrotero de la expedición en la provincia de los Texas, Nuevo Reyno de Philipinas, and had it printed in México in 1722.

Pedro de Rivera y Villalón, a brigadier general, described the Reino de Nuevas Philipinas, which he inventoried during his 1724-1728 mission to northern New Spain, in his 1736 book Diario y derrotero de lo caminado.

The Irish-Spaniard monk Juan Agustín Morfi wrote in 1779 the Relación geográfica e histórica de la provincia de Texas o Nuevas Filipinas. His book was translated to English and published in 1935 by Carlos Castañeda as "History of Texas: 1673–1779. By fray Juan Agustin Morfi. Missionary, Teacher, Historian". Morfi is considered the most important chronicler and historian of New Philippines. (Note: "se trata del principal historiador y cronista de la provincia de Nuevas Filipinas")

=== Royal correspondence ===
Philip V having assented to his governorship of the territory, the Marqués de Aguayo on June 13, 1722, wrote back, thanking the king that the recovery (from the French) of the "New Kingdom of the Philippines, should have been entrusted to my feeble management."

== Disestablishment ==
After Philip V's death in 1746, there were no other Spanish kings named Philip until 2014. The name New Philippines progressively ceased to be used in government reports, the census, instructions, and correspondence, and by the early 1800s few legal documents made reference to New Philippines, other than in land grants. (Note: "by 1800, it began to fall into disuse except for documents pertaining to land grants. Government reports, the census, instructions, and correspondence no longer made reference to Nuevas Filipinas")

With the end of New Spain and the creation of the Mexican Empire in 1821, the sole legal name for the territory of New Philippines became Provincia de Texas, which years later became part of the Mexican state of Coahuila y Tejas.

== See also ==
- History of Texas

== Bibliography ==
- Arreola, Daniel D. (2002). "3 • Territory Shaped". Tejano South Texas: A Mexican American Cultural Province. University of Texas Press. doi:10.7560/705104. ISBN 9780292757189. - Access date: May 6, 2002. Read online at DeGruyter
