= Juan Valdez (governor) =

Governor of Coahuila y Texas
- In office 1714–1716
- Preceded by: Pedro Fermín de Echevers y Subisa
- Succeeded by: Martín de Alarcón

Juan Valdez was Governor of Texas and Coahuila, and lieutenant general and alcalde (mayor) of the presidio and villa of Bexar in 1714 and 1716.

== Biography ==
Juan Valdez was chosen governor of Texas and Coahuila twice: in 1714 and in 1716. He was mayor of the presidio of villa of Bexar (San Antonio, Texas) in 1720. During his mayoralty in Bexar, he established a mission in a place of San Jose and San Miguel de Aguayo, under orders of the viceroy of New Spain, even after that Antonio de Olivares filed a petition asking that the mission not be done in Zacatecas (in modern Mexico) as it had been planned to establish a new mission.
