= Rafael Gonzáles =

American politician

1st Governor of Coahuila and Tejas
- In office 1824–1826
- Preceded by: Luciano García (governor of Texas) and José Rafael Eça y Múzquiz (governor of Coahuila)
- Succeeded by: Víctor Blanco

Personal details
- Born: 1789 San Fernando de Béxar, Spanish Texas (now San Antonio, Texas, U.S.)
- Died: 1857 (aged 67–68) San Antonio, Texas, U.S.
- Profession: Military leader and Political

Rafael Gonzáles (1789–1857) was a Tejano military leader and Governor of the Mexican state of Coahuila y Tejas from 1824 to 1826.

== Early life ==
Gonzáles was born in San Fernando de Béxar, Spanish Texas (now San Antonio, Texas) in 1789. He joined the military as a cadet to collaborate at the Nuestra Señora de Loreto presidio. In October 1810, at age 20, Gonzáles was made Second Alferez, and two years later he earned the title of First Alferez.

== Career ==
On June 3, 1814, Gonzáles got the degree of Second lieutenant, and joined the presidio's garrison of Monclova (Coahuila, in modern Mexico). One year later, on July 14, 1815, he was promoted to first lieutenant of the Royalist company of Presidio de Rio Grande, and on May 18, 1818 he reached the rank of captain.

On July 3, 1821, Gonzáles participated in the Mexican War of Independence. On December 12, 1821 he was promoted to lieutenant colonel. On August 15, 1824, he was appointed governor of Coahuila and Texas. In that year, Gonzales granted each Shawnee family who settled in Texas a square mile of land in the south bank of Red River.

He was governor of Coahuila and Texas until March 15, 1826, when he was replaced by Victor Blanco. In 1834 Gonzales was appointed secretary of Coahuila and Texas. He died in 1857.

== Legacy ==
The town of Gonzales, Texas was named to honor his bravery.
