= Manuel Antonio Cordero y Bustamante =

Spanish soldier and politician

34th Governor of Coahuila (1st time)
- In office 1797–1805
- Preceded by: Juan Gutiérrez de la Cueva
- Succeeded by: José Joaquín de Ugarte

31st Governor of Spanish Texas
- In office 1805–1808
- Preceded by: Juan Bautista Elguézabal
- Succeeded by: Manuel María de Salcedo

36th Governor of Coahuila (2nd time)
- In office 1809–1817
- Preceded by: José Joaquín de Ugarte
- Succeeded by: Antonio García de Tejada

18th Governor-Intendant of Sonora (1st time)
- In office 1813–1813
- Preceded by: Alejo García Conde
- Succeeded by: Ignacio de Bustamante

23rd Governor-Intendant of Sonora (2nd time)
- In office 1819–1819
- Preceded by: Juan José Lombrán
- Succeeded by: Sonora and Sinaloa were no longer a province.

Personal details
- Born: 1753 Cádiz (Andalusia, Spanish Empire)
- Died: near of March 25, 1823 Durango, Mexico
- Profession: Political and commander

Manuel Antonio Cordero y Bustamante (1753 – about March 25, 1823) was a Spanish soldier and politician who served as acting governor of Coahuila (in the current Mexico; 1797–98), governor of the same province (1798–1817), acting governor of Texas (1805–1808) and governor of the province of Sonora and Sinaloa (specifically he was a Governor-Intendant of Sonora; in modern Mexico, 1813 and 1819).

== Biography ==
=== Early years ===
Manuel Antonio Cordero y Bustamante was born in the Andalusian province of Cadiz, Spain. At age 19 he joined the Spanish army, beginning his career as a cadet on December 1, 1767. He only spent four years in this army and by 1771 he was living in Mexico, where he joined the army of there. So over seven years he served in various Spanish armies, such as the Zamora Infantry and the Dragoons of Spain and New Spain. In addition, he was a member of the garrisons of Janos and San Buenaventura's presidios, both in Chihuahua, in the modern Mexico. Eventually, he attained the rank of lieutenant colonel.

Between 1777 and 1790, he fought in many wars in the Provincias Internas (Interior Provinces), a province consisting of Alta and Baja California, Arizona, New Mexico, Texas, Nueva Vizcaya and Coahuila, and other regions of northern Mexico. There he had his first contact with Texas and Coahuila, two places where later he would occupy the governor's office. He participated in a total of twenty-five military campaigns in the region. In most of them, he served as commander, except in four, in which he served only as a subordinate.

In 1787, Cordero y Bustamante signed the peace with several Native American people of the zone: the Mimbreños (an Apaches tribe) and the Gilena. Later, he served as commander of the province of Nueva Vizcaya, maintaining that position between 1790 and 1791. During this time, he "chased marauders" and repressed the Native Americans revolts against the Spanish Government. These revolts implied attack to the ranches of the settlers. Bustamante employed punishment against such rebels.

In 1794, Bustamante returned to fight against the Mimbreños and Gilena peoples, who had attacked the Presidio of Janos, to submit them to the Spanish authority. In 1795, he led a military campaign to the Presidio del Norte (North Presidio), where he fought the Mescaleros. Between 1795 and 1800, Bustamante established many settlements and towns in Coahuila and put up the defenses of the place. On December 27, 1796, he began leading the troops from the border of Coahuila, serving as commander.

In January 1797, the King of Spain appointed him governor of Texas to replace Manuel Muñoz in his later years. However, during this time he was fighting the Apaches, and so was unable to fill the position. Later, on March 27 of that year, the king of Spain named him acting governor of Coahuila. Cordero sent a letter to Manuel Muñoz indicating he had been appointed acting governor of that region.

However, in 1805, while Cordero governed Coahuila, he was also appointed acting governor of Texas and he had to leave the government of Coahuila.

=== Government in Coahuila and Texas ===
In September 1805, during his administration in Texas, he came to San Antonio because he had received orders to strengthen several military posts in the Orcoquisas, Nacogdoches, and Los Adaes presidios. Cordero y Bustamante led troops in Nacogdoches to protect the frontier of Texas with Louisiana (which was a target of the American government, who wanted to occupy the region. Indeed, this area currently belongs to Louisiana). However, in the fall of 1806, this zone ceased to be disputed, as it got the status of neutral zone.

In addition, he promoted the emigration to Texas, mainly of craftsmen, to build a fort against American invasion. He convinced people of the interior of modern Mexico to emigrate to Texas, but he also tried to get North American immigrants to leave the province and he established a law that freed those slaves who emigrated from Louisiana to Texas. Moreover, he fostered good relations between the soldiers and settlers with the Native Americans for protect the frontiers from foreign invasions. In 1806, Cordero y Bustamante ordered the construction of the first hospital in Texas, which was primarily intended for the care of soldiers.

Cordero y Bustamante governed Texas until November 7, 1808. In this year, he finished his term, being replaced by Manuel María de Salcedo (appointed governor of Texas on April 24).

In 1809, Cordero y Bustamante was appointed governor of Coahuila. However, under a royal order, he had to continue living temporarily in Texas to help Salcedo in his new duties as governor and in the defense of the borders of the province. He remained there until 1810. Also, during this time, he planned to create settlement areas in Colorado, San Marcos de Reve, Brazos, Trinity, and the Guadalupe River. However, he only managed to create settlements in San Marcos and Trinidad, in addition to another settlement: Palafox Villa.

He moved to Coahuila in 1810, beginning his term as governor of that province.

In 1813, Cordero was governor of the province of Sonora and Sinaloa; particularly he was a Governor-Intendant of Sonora.

In 1817, he stepped down as governor of Coahuila and in 1819 he again became governor of Sonora and Sinaloa.

=== Last years ===
Later, in 1822, Cordero was appointed commanding general of the Western Interior Province and field marshal general, although he died shortly after, in December 1823. during the same time as he was lying ill in the city of Durango, Mexico. He refused to endorse the Plan of Casa Mata, which did away with the first imperium, and resigned from office on March 6, 1823. He died a few days later. He was buried on March 25, 1823.

Cordero y Bustamante wrote a very important monograph about the Apaches.

== Personal life ==
The America explorer Zebulon Pike made an interesting physical and personal description of Cordero. According to him, the Spanish political and soldier was blond, his eyes were blue, his complexion was clear, and he was about five feet and ten inches tall. As for his behavior, he believed that the military man had great confidence in himself and he was one of the most capable commanders on the Spanish Texas border.
