= Víctor Blanco de Rivera =

Mexican official and politician

Víctor Blanco

2nd Governor of Coahuila y Tejas
- In office 1826–1827
- Preceded by: Rafael Gonzáles
- Succeeded by: José María Viesca

Personal details
- Profession: Official and Politician

Víctor Blanco de Rivera was a Mexican official and politician who served as Governor of Coahuila y Tejas (Coahuila and Texas) from 1826 to 1827. He also served as alternate deputy of Coahuila (1823), Vice Governor of Texas (1827) and Senator in the Mexican Congress (1833–1835). He also fought in the Mexican–American War (1846–1848).

== Biography ==
Victor Blanco was a citizen of Monclova, Coahuila, and was brother-in-law of Ramón Músquiz, a governor of Mexican Texas.

On September 8, 1823, he became the alternate deputy of Coahuila. He appointed Samuel May Williams as an agent to help him to choose a place in Texas to establish a new colony, but the plans were never followed through with.

Blanco was appointed Governor of Coahuila and Texas on May 30, 1826.

During his administration in Texas, Blanco broke a contract with Col. Hayden Edwards, head of the Edwards colony, on August 23, 1826. Edwards and his brother were from Kentucky and had started the Edwards colony but were having trouble with local Mexicans in the territory. In response to the broken contract, Hayden and Benjamin W. Edwards rose up in the Fredonian Rebellion of 1826, but were defeated by Blanco.

He promoted the American settlement in East Texas. He also considered the construction of a cotton gin in northern Coahuila.

He left office as governor on January 27, 1827. Shortly thereafter, on July 4, 1827, Blanco was appointed first Vice Governor of Coahuila and Texas.

Later, in 1833, he was appointed Senator in the Mexican Congress, being re-elected to the same position in 1835. In the legislature, Blanco had ideological conflicts with Stephen F. Austin, as he opposed to Texas breaking territorial ties with Coahuila and becoming an independent state.

In 1841 Blanco traveled to Monclova and fought in a military campaign against indigenous peoples. He later fought in the Mexican–American War (1846–48).

The time and place of his death are unknown.
