= Jesús de Cárdenas =

Jesús de Cárdenas Duarte

1st President of the Republic of the Rio Grande
- In office January 17, 1840 – November 6, 1840
- Vice President: José María Jesús Carbajal
- Preceded by: Position established
- Succeeded by: Position abolished

Governor of Tamaulipas
- In office September 30, 1851 – November 19, 1852
- Preceded by: Antonio Canales Rosillo
- Succeeded by: Juan José de la Garza Cisneros

Personal details
- Born: Jesús Cárdenas Duarte

Jesús de Cárdenas Duarte was the Governor of Tamaulipas and the President of the Republic of the Rio Grande.

After Coahuila, Nuevo León and Tamaulipas declared independence in October 1838 and formally organized their provisional government on January 18, 1839 with Jesús de Cárdenas as President, the January 28, 1839 supporters of the rebellion placed the flag of this republic in the town square of Guerrero, Tamaulipas and every man went under the banner of the proclaimed Republic of the Rio Grande to kiss the flag as a sign of loyalty. And after a campaign by the inner federalist entities Coahuila, Nuevo León and Tamaulipas, their leaders agreed to hold a convention in Laredo, Texas on January 17, 1840, which declared independence from Mexico and established provisionally the capital of the Republic of the Rio Grande in Laredo, Texas. The Republic of Rio Grande claimed as its territory the areas of Tamaulipas and Coahuila to the north until the Nueces river and Medina respectively, and all the states of Zacatecas, Durango, Chihuahua and Nuevo México, among those present were appointed official representatives of the Republic of the Rio Grande.

Currently in Laredo, Texas is a small museum about the "Republic of the Rio Grande" in the Plaza Zaragoza, one block away from the border with Mexico. The museum is located approximately where the seat of government of the Republic was located, and includes the display of a replica of the flag that flew there, it being assumed that the original flag was probably captured by the centralist Mexican Army, and perhaps it is in the Museum Chapultepec.

== Government ==
- Jesús de Cárdenas, president.
- Antonio Canales, commander-in-chief of the army.
- Juan Nepomuceno Molano, council representative for Tamaulipas.
- Francisco Vidaurri y Villaseñor, council representative for Coahuila.
- Manuel María de Llano, council representative for Nuevo León.
- José María Jesús Carbajal, council secretary.

=== Unrecognized Independence ===
- October 11, 1838, Coahuila, Nuevo León and Tamaulipas, declared their independence.
- January 18, 1839, the government organized, displaying, and rendering honors to the new flag in the Plaza de Ciudad Guerrero, Tamaulipas.

== Uprisings ==
In Coahuila was attacked Antonio Zapata in prison "Agua Verde" and captured on March 15 near Santa Rita de Morelos. Antonio Canales de Rosillo to learn came to his aid, being also defeated by General Mariano Arista, near Morelos. Zapata and some Americans who fought at his side were taken near Monclova and shot. Antonio Canales de Rosillo with little remaining troops retreated to San Antonio, Texas, while Jesus de Cardenas and the caretaker cabinet of the Republic of Rio Grande fled to Victoria, Texas. They traveled through Texas for help, was in Austin, Houston and San Patricio, where he reorganized his army, composed at that time by 300 Mexicans, 140 Americans and 80 Indians, although their number was increasing daily. The main leader of the Americans was Colonel Jordan, who on June 90 assigned men to be in the vanguard of the army of Rio Grande. They moved down the inside of Tamaulipas, Ciudad Victoria without taking a single battle, minions of Jordania treacherous driving to San Luis Potosi, but Colonel suspecting treachery, changed direction and marched towards Saltillo. There, on October 25, 1840 were attacked by the troops of the centralist General Rafael Vásquez and although many of his men deserted, managed to fight back and return to Texas.

In November 1840 a commission of Antonio Canales de Rosillo met the General Mariano Arista to surrender in Camargo and finally Antonio Canales de Rosillo was joined to the centralist army of Mexico as an officer and the rebel states rejoined Mexico. The Republic of Rio Grande only lasted 283 days.
