= Francisco Vidaurri y Villaseñor =

Governor of Coahuila y Texas (1834)

15th Governor of Coahuila and Texas
- In office 8 January 1834 – 23 July 1834
- Preceded by: Juan Martín de Veramendi
- Succeeded by: Juan José Elguézabal

Personal details
- Profession: Political

José Francisco Vidaurri y Villaseñor was the governor of the Mexican province of Coahuila y Texas for a brief period in 1834. He was a strong advocate of Mexican federalism and was a member of the convention for the founding of the Republic of Rio Grande in 1840.

== Biography ==
Vidaurri y Villaseñor was the half-brother of Pedro José Vidaurri y de la Cruz, who was the father of the Mexican politician Santiago Vidaurri.

Villaseñor was appointed governor of the Mexican province of Coahuila y Texas in 1833 or early 1834, taking over the government of the province on 8 January of the latter year. However, he only remained in the government until 23 July, when he was replaced by Juan José Elguézabal as governor of the province.

As a defender of federalism, he traveled to San Antonio, Texas in August of that year in order to obtain support for the federalist party. Villaseñor defended that the entire population of northern Mexico was in favor of that political ideology, unlike the population of the South. He believed that the population of the South was "ignorant" and that was more permissive of despotic governments (he pointed out that the southerners "can only be governed by a despotism") because they supported centralism. Villaseñor also defended the independence of northern Mexico, posing it as an independent country. His defense of the region's independence was based on the aforementioned political differences between the north and the south (i.e., a federalist north versus a centralist south). In fact, Villaseñor was sure that his proposal would be successful and that the north of Mexico would obtain its independence, regardless of whether Texas became a republic or remained part of Mexico. However, the Texas press, which belonged to Anglo-Saxon publishers (such as Telegraph and Texas Register) was opposed to Texas remaining in Mexico, although it supported the federalists.

On 17 January 1840, Villaseñor participated in a convention held in Laredo, Texas to proclaim the so-called República de Río Grande. The new republic would consist of the states of Coahuila, Tamaulipas, and Nuevo León and would be an independent country from Mexico. This convention consisted of Jesús de Cárdenas (president of the convention), Antonio Canales Rosillo (commanding general of the army), Juan Nepomuceno Molano (the delegate of Tamaulipas), Manuel María de Llano (the delegate of Nuevo León), and José María Jesús Carbajal (the secretary of the convention), as well as Villaseñor, who served as the delegate of Coahuila. However, the new country only lasted 293 days, as Mexican General Mariano Arista forced its dissolution. The country was dissolved on 6 November 1840.
