= Battle of Saltillo =

- Part of the Rio Grande rebellion
Date	25 October 1840
Location	Saltillo, Coahuila
Result	Defensive Riograndese victory: Riograndese forces withdraw soon after.

Belligerents
Mexico	Republic of the Rio Grande

Commanders and leaders
Ráfael Vásquez	Samuel Jordan

Strength
790 men	90 men

Casualties and losses
400 killed	5 killed

The Battle of Saltillo (October 25, 1840) was fought between insurgents under the command of Colonel Samuel Jordan fighting for the Republic of the Rio Grande and the Centralists under the command of General Ráfael Vásquez fighting for the First Mexican Republic. The result was a victory for the Rio Grande.

== Prelude ==
General Antonio Canales and the remaining insurgents that survived the Battle of Morales (25 March) sought refuge in San Antonio, Texas.

While official recognition from the Republic of Texas was not obtained, General Canales' tour was met with some success. On the 1 June he arrived in San Patricio, where the rebellion forces had been reorganising. In addition to 300 volunteers, the army had grown to include 140 Texan and 80 Native American volunteers. The Texan volunteers were led by Colonel Samuel Jordan.

== Battle ==
General Canales sent Colonel Jordan and approximately 90 Texan volunteers south into disputed territory in late June; they crossed the Rio Grande, and took Ciudad Victoria, the capital of Tamaulipas, without any resistance. A few of those who were guiding Jordan were still loyal to the Central government of Mexico and were trying to lead the Texans towards San Luis Potosí, where a Mexican ambush awaited. Jordan suspected such and diverted his troops to Saltillo, Coahuila, where, on the 25 October he was attacked by Mexican General Ráfael Vásquez. Some of Jordan's soldiers deserted and he was heavily outnumbered, but he was able to defend himself and return to Texas.

== Aftermath ==
Soon after this defeat Canales capitulated to the Centralists.
