= Battle of Santa Rita de Morelos =

- Part of Rio Grande rebellion
Date	24 – 25 March 1840
Location	Morelos, Coahuila 28°24′27″N 100°53′08″W
Result	Mexican victory

Belligerents
Mexico	Republic of the Rio Grande

Commanders and leaders
Mariano Arista	Antonio Canales Rosillo; José Antonio de Zapata (executed)

Strength
1,800	30

Casualties and losses
Unknown	23 killed

The Battle of Santa Rita de Morelos or Battle of Morelos (24-25 March 1840) was between insurgents under the command of General Antonio Canales fighting for the Republic of the Rio Grande and the Centralists under the command of General Mariano Arista fighting for the First Mexican Republic. The result was a victory for the Centralists.

== Battle ==
The respective armies of the insurgents met at Morelos, Coahuila on the 24-25 March 1840. The Centralist Mexican forces defeated the insurgent forces. Included in this defeat was the trial and execution of 23 members of the insurgents' cavalry, including Colonel Jose Antonio de Zapata, the commander of the cavalry, on the 29 March.

== Aftermath ==
General Canales and the remaining insurgents that survived the Battle of Morelos sought refuge in San Antonio, Texas. Later that year Canales organized an expedition back into Mexico under the command of Samuel Jordan, decisively defeating a Centralist force under General Rafael Vasquez near Saltillo. After the battle, Jordan and his command withdrew in good order back into Texas, and soon afterwards, Canales capitulated to the Centralists.
