= Manuel María Lombardini =

President of Mexico in 1853

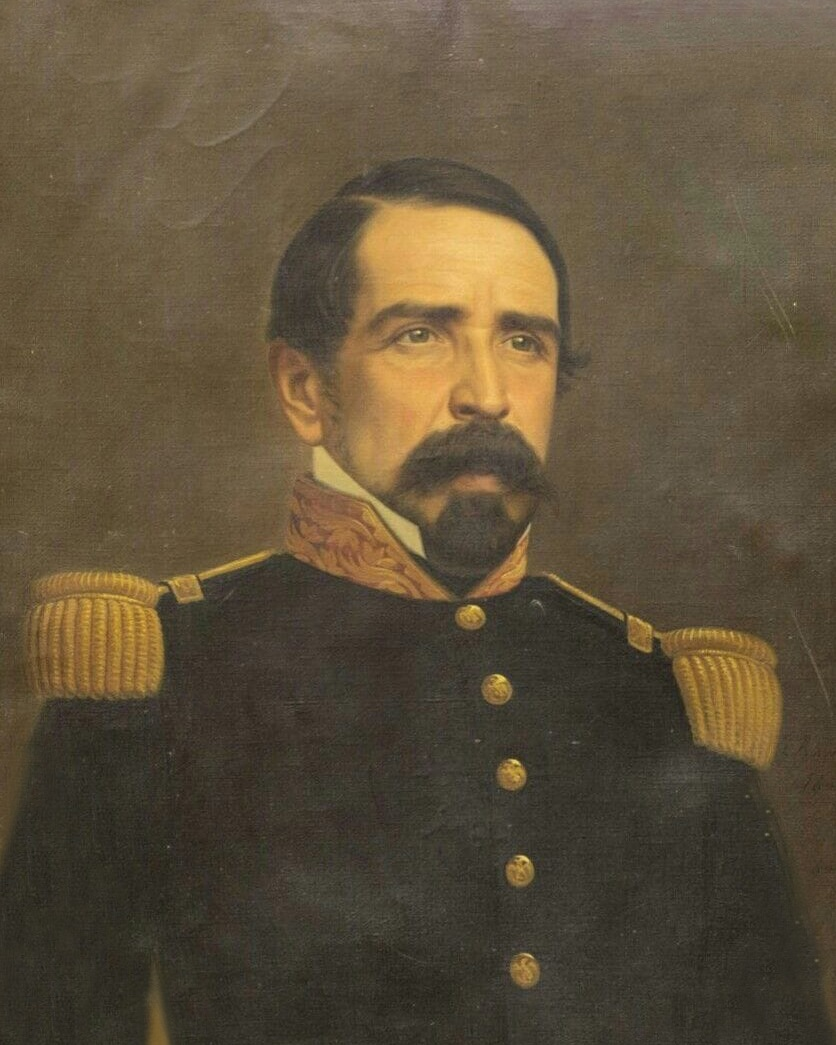

21st President of Mexico
- In office 8 February – 20 April 1853
- Preceded by: Juan Bautista Ceballos
- Succeeded by: Antonio López de Santa Anna

Personal details
- Born: 23 July 1802 Mexico City, New Spain
- Died: 22 December 1853 (aged 51) Mexico City, Mexico
- Party: Conservative

Military service
- Allegiance: Mexico
- Branch/service: Mexican Army

Manuel Apolinario Josef María Ignacio Antonio Lombardini de la Torre (1802–1853) was a Mexican soldier who served as President of Mexico briefly for about three months in 1853. He rose to power in the wake of a revolution against the government of President Mariano Arista. After Arista and his successor Juan Bautista Ceballos resigned, the insurgents elevated Lombardini to the presidency as a matter of convenience, and he was only ever meant to serve as a placeholder while the true aim of the insurgents, the restoration of Santa Anna, was carried out. Lombardini would resign accordingly on 20 April, and he died of pneumonia in December of the same year.

== Early life ==
Manuel María Lombardini was born in Mexico City in 1802, and joined the military at a young age, serving with merit as a member of the artillery corps. In August 1814, he became a member of the Patriots of Tacubaya company and fought on the Spanish side in the War of Mexican Independence before switching allegiances in August 1821 to support Agustín de Iturbide and the Plan of Iguala. He presented himself before the Sixth Cavalry Squadron at Toluca, and under the command of General Filisola took part in the siege of Mexico City. He left the military one year later, but political developments which led up to the Arenas Conspiracy, a plot to restore Spanish rule in 1827, led him to return to military service.

== First Mexican Republic ==
During the First Mexican Republic, he joined the liberal Yorkino Party as a sublieutenant, and joined in the assault made at Tulancingo on 7 January 1828, against the Plan of Montaño in which the conservative Esoces Party led by Nicolás Bravo attempted to overthrow the government of Guadalupe Victoria. Lombardini continued to champion the causes of the Yorkino Party which included the demand for public offices, and the expulsion of the Spaniards, but during the Revolution of the Accordada during which liberal supporters fought against president elect and Minister of War Manuel Gómez Pedraza he remained loyal to the government of Guadalupe Victoria.

He took part in the Plan of Jalapa against Vicente Guerrero in 1829 and was in charge of the forces destined to fight Guerrero's partisans in Chietla and Oaxaca. In 1830 he reached the rank of lieutenant. He joined the Plan of Veracruz against President Bustamante in April, 1832, joining the forces of General Ignacio Inclan with twenty five armed soldiers from Mexico City. He was made captain of veterans at the end of the year after joining the forces of Colonel Valencia in the fight against Bustamante in September 1832.

As Valencia's assistant he entered to Zumpango took part in the taking of Lerma and Toluca and in the siege of Mexico City, seeing action as well at Casas Blancas. He also fought at the Rancho de Posadas, and upon winning there was granted the rank of lieutenant colonel by Santa Anna. He took the town of Zacapoaxtla and established order there. Bustamante would be overthrown in December 1832 and the triumphant liberals would elect Santa Anna and Valentín Gómez Farías, but discontent over the new administration caused another revolution to flare up, eventually joined by Santa Anna who had switched sides to the conservatives. Lombardini would also switch sides and in June 1834 he distinguished himself at the siege of Puebla, taking part in the conservative Plan of Cuernavaca which overthrew president Valentín Gómez Farías. He was granted the rank of lieutenant, and Battalion Number 11 was placed at his disposal.

== Centralist Republic of Mexico ==
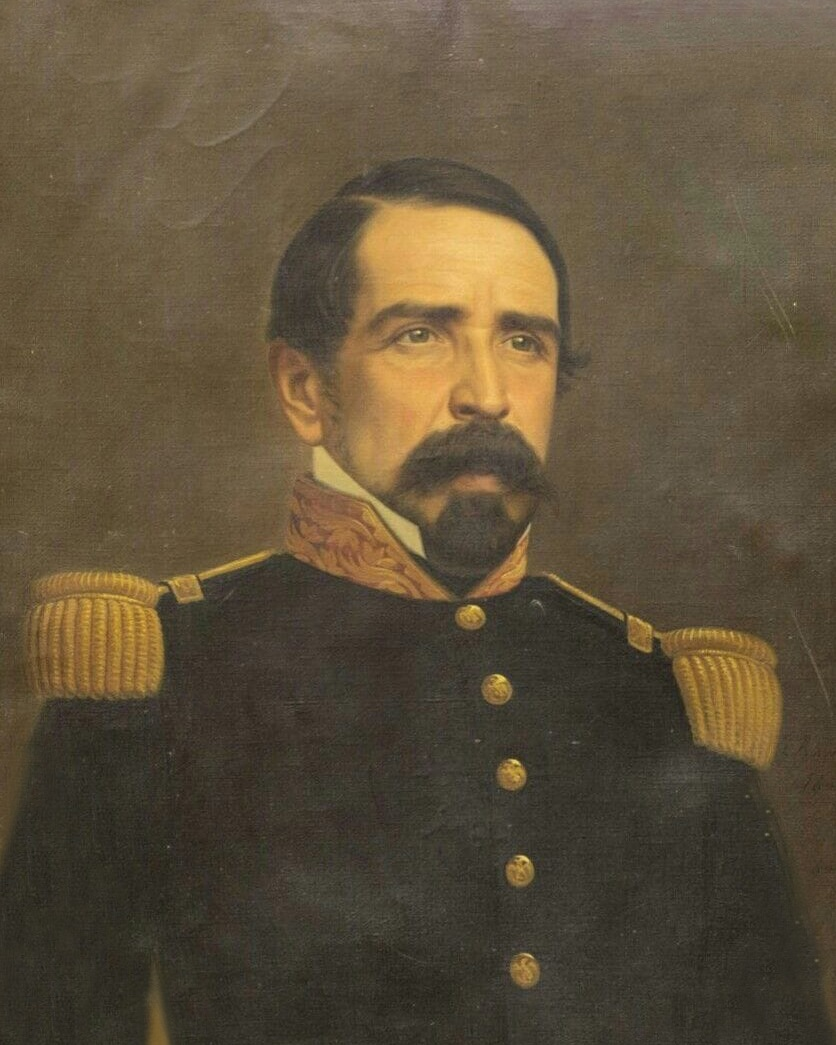
Manuel Maria Lombardini, Presidente interino de México

Under the Centralist Republic of Mexico, in 1836, he joined the campaign against Texas which had already won a de facto independence in 1835, unrecognized by Mexican authorities. He was placed under the command of Nicolás Bravo, in 1836, but when the Pastry War broke out, he joined the struggle against the French, marching towards Veracruz and afterward Tuxpam with the forces commanded by General Cos.

During the Federalist Revolt of 1839 against the rule of President Anastasio Bustamante who had returned to power, he was taken prisoner by the federalist commanders Urrea and Mejia. He returned in Mexico in time for the Federalist Revolt of 1840, during which insurgents took control of the National Palace and during which warfare devastated the capital for twelve days. He joined Valencia during another revolt, against President Anastasio Bustamante on 31 August 1841, not aimed at restoring the federalist system, but upon establishing a stronger more centralist system which came to be known as the Bases of Tacubaya.

He fought bravely during the Mexican-American War, and was wounded at the Battle of Angostura. When Mexican forces evacuated the capital in September, 1847, they did so under Lombardini's command. After the war ended he was made a commander in the capital. He defended the troops who lost their jobs in the wake of the Arista administration's vast downsizing measures, and when revolution flared up, he came to an arrangement with the leaders of the Plan of Jalisco in 1852. Both President Arista and President Ceballos resigned after being able to control the revolution and the insurgents then chose Lombardini as the new president on 8 February.

== Presidency ==
Lombardini was a mere placeholder while the final aim of the insurgents, the restoration of Santa Anna, was carried out. He formed no cabinet, but attended to the different ministries through existing subordinate officials. He had no experience or talents as an administrator, and his brief reign was marked by corruption, confusion and disorder, especially in the financial sphere. The army swelled in expenses and commissions.

Meanwhile, the state authorities, which had been charged by the insurgents with electing the new president, decided on 17 March to elect Santa Anna to the presidency. Lombardini now began receiving orders from Santa Anna, and on 12 April, Lombardini granted Santa Anna the title of captain-general. Lombardini officially handed over the office of president on 20 April.

== Later life ==
After resigning from the presidency, Lombardini retained the post of chief of the capital garrison, and continued to support Santa Anna. His health declined however, and he died of pneumonia on 22 December 1853. His death received very little attention, having been overshadowed by the restoration of Santa Anna.

== See also ==
- List of heads of state of Mexico

Political offices
Preceded by Juan Bautista Ceballos	President of Mexico; 8 February – 20 April 1853	Succeeded by Antonio López de Santa Anna
