= Mexican Federal Highway 29 =

Highway in Mexico

Federal Highway 29
- Carretera federal 29

Route information
- Maintained by Secretariat of Communications and Transportation
- Length: 104 km (65 mi)

Major junctions
- North end: Fed. 2 in Ciudad Acuña
- South end: Fed. 57 in Morelos, Coahuila

Location
- Country: Mexico
- State: Coahuila

Highway system
- Mexican Federal Highways; List; Autopistas
← Fed. 25	→ Fed. 30

Federal Highway 29 (Spanish: Carretera Federal 29, Fed. 29) is a toll-free part of the federal highway corridors (Spanish: los corredores carreteros federales) of Mexico. The highway connects Ciudad Acuña, Coahuila in the north near the Mexico – United States border to Morelos, Coahuila to the south. The total length of Fed. 29 is 104 km (65 mi). City streets in Ciudad Acuña connect the federal highways corridors (los corredores carreteros federales) to U.S. Route 277 in Del Rio, Texas.
