= Juan José Elguézabal =

American politician

Juan José Elguezábal

8th Governor of Coahuila and Texas
- In office 1834 – May 12, 1835
- Preceded by: Francisco Vidaurri y Villaseñor
- Succeeded by: José María Cantú

Personal details
- Born: 1781 San Antonio, Texas, New Spain, Spanish Empire
- Died: 1840 (aged 58–59) Matamoros, Mexico
- Profession: Military, Presidios´s Inspector and Governor of Texas (1834 and 1835)

Juan José Elguezábal (1781–1840) was a Spanish and Mexican soldier; and attached inspector of Presidios. He also served as Interim Governor of Coahuila y Tejas between 1834 and 1835. In addition, he served in the Texas Revolution as commander of First Company of Tamaulipas, Mexico; fighting against the separatists of Texas.

== Biography ==
Elguezábal was born in 1781, in San Antonio, Texas to María Gertrudis Jiménez and Juan Bautista Elguézabal; a former Governor of Texas between 1800 and 1805. Elguezábal joined the Spanish Army in his youth and he lived in Coahuila (in the modern day Mexico) for the most of his career. So, he served as the army Captain of the region and the Commander of the Presidio of the Río Grande zone. In addition, Elguézabal also served as an adjutant Inspector in the Coahuila and Texas Presidios, as his father had also done. Eventually, Elguezábal ascended to Colonel.

On August 30, 1834, Elguezábal was appointed Interim Governor of Texas by the City Hall of Monclova, Coahuila. He remained in that position until Agustín Viesca was appointed as new official Governor of Texas, leaving the office on May 12, 1835.

Elguezábal participated in the Texas Revolution, serving as commander of the First Company of Tamaulipas. On December 10, 1835, Elguézabal and the general Martín Perfecto de Cos were captured when the event called the Siege of Bexar was ending. Eventually released, he returned to Matamoros, Mexico; where he lived until his death in 1840.
