= Flag of the Republic of the Rio Grande =

Republic of the Rio Grande
- Adopted: 1840
- Relinquished: 1840
- Design: One-third of the hoist is blue containing three white stars. The remaining field is divided horizontally into three bars: white on top, red in the middle, and black on the bottom.

The flag of the Republic of the Rio Grande was used in 1840, during the 283 days from January 17 to November 6, when the republic existed. This country was formed by the northeastern Mexican states of Coahuila, Nuevo León, and Tamaulipas. The flag was no longer used following the defeat of the Republic of the Rio Grande by Mexican troops.

== Design ==
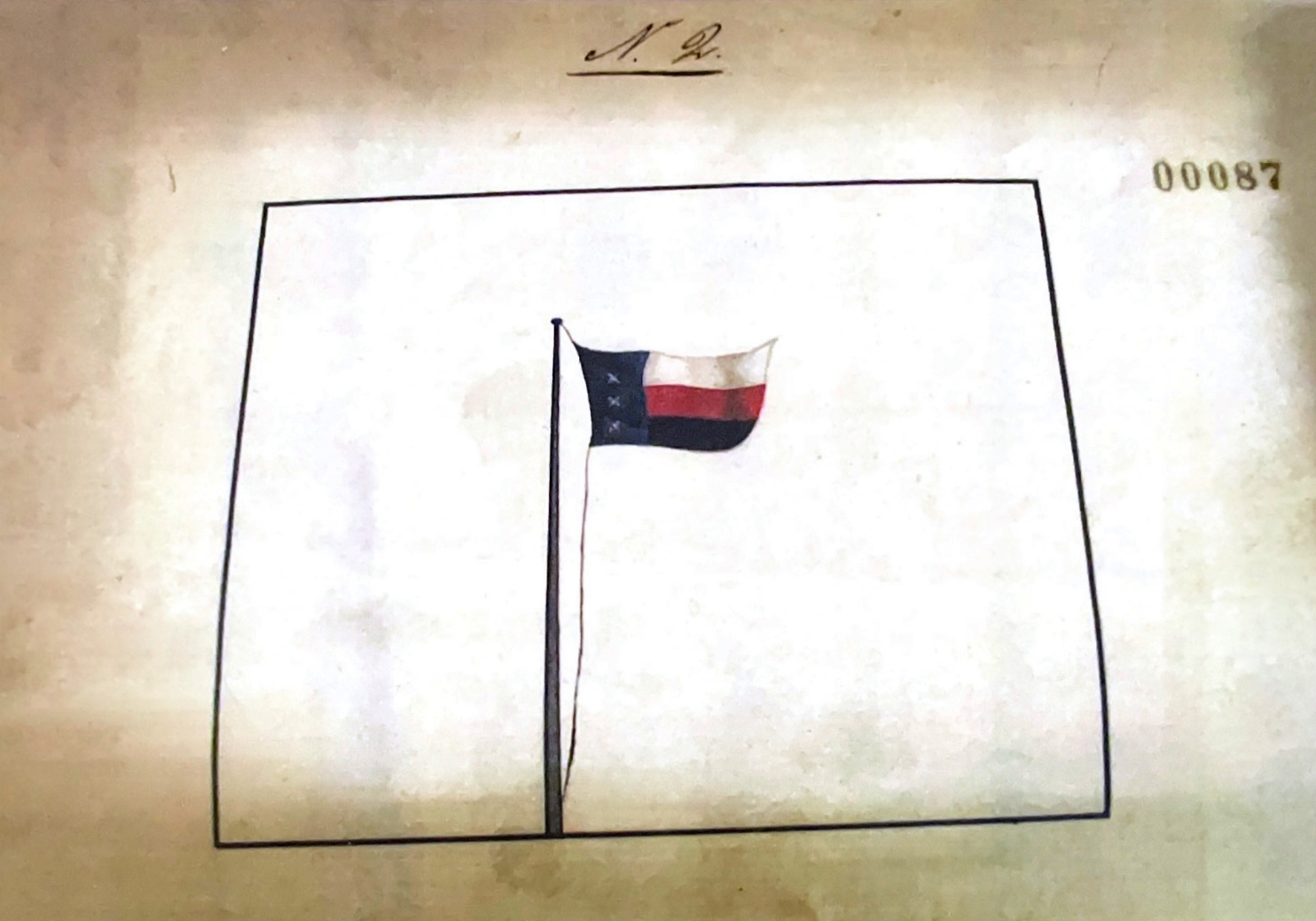
This sketch from 1840 was created by a Centralist spy in the Federalist army camp of José M. J. Carbajal

The flag of the Republic of the Rio Grande has a blue hoist with three white stars run evenly along the hoist. The three stars represent the three states that seceded: Coahuila, Nuevo León, and Tamaulipas. The fly is split into three bands, one white, one red, and one black.

There are other suggested designs for the flag as noted by historians, including tricolors of (a) red, white, and black; (b) red, white, and blue; and (c) red, white, and green.

This variant shows a black stripe

This variant shows a green stripe

This variant shows a dark blue bottom stripe

Historians have noted that, whatever the flag looked like, it bore similarities to the 1839 flag of the Republic of Texas and the 1841 flag of the later Republic of Yucatán.

The city of Laredo, Texas uses the black stripe variant of this flag as its city flag, while also incorporating it and the six flags over the rest of Texas on its city coat of arms. Laredo had served as the capital of the brief republic. The city of Weslaco, Texas uses the black stripe variant on display with the aforementioned six flags of Texas in their city museum.

== See also ==
- Flag of Texas
- Flag of Mexico
