= Flag of Laredo, Texas =

City of Laredo
- Design: A horizontal bicolor with white on top and black on the bottom. The left-most third is a red strip with three white stars arranged in a vertical line

The flag of Laredo, Texas is based on the flag of the Republic of the Rio Grande, which was used for 283 days from January 17 to November 6, 1840.

== Design ==
The flag has a red hoist with three white stars run evenly along the hoist. The fly is split into a white upper fly and a black lower fly. The city's flag is also incorporated on its city coat of arms, along with the six flags over the rest of Texas.

== History ==
The historical flag of the Rio Grande, which the flag of Laredo is based on

The flag of the Republic of the Rio Grande was used in 1840, during 283 days from January 17 to November 6, as long as the republic existed. This country was formed by the northeastern Mexican states of Coahuila, Nuevo León, and Tamaulipas. The flag was no longer used following the defeat of the Republic of the Rio Grande by Mexican troops.

The flag was designed to be similar to the Flag of Texas. The three stars represent the three states that seceded: Coahuila, Nuevo León, and Tamaulipas.

== See also ==
- Flag of Texas
- Flag of Mexico
