= Six flags over Texas =

Colloquial phrase referencing Texas

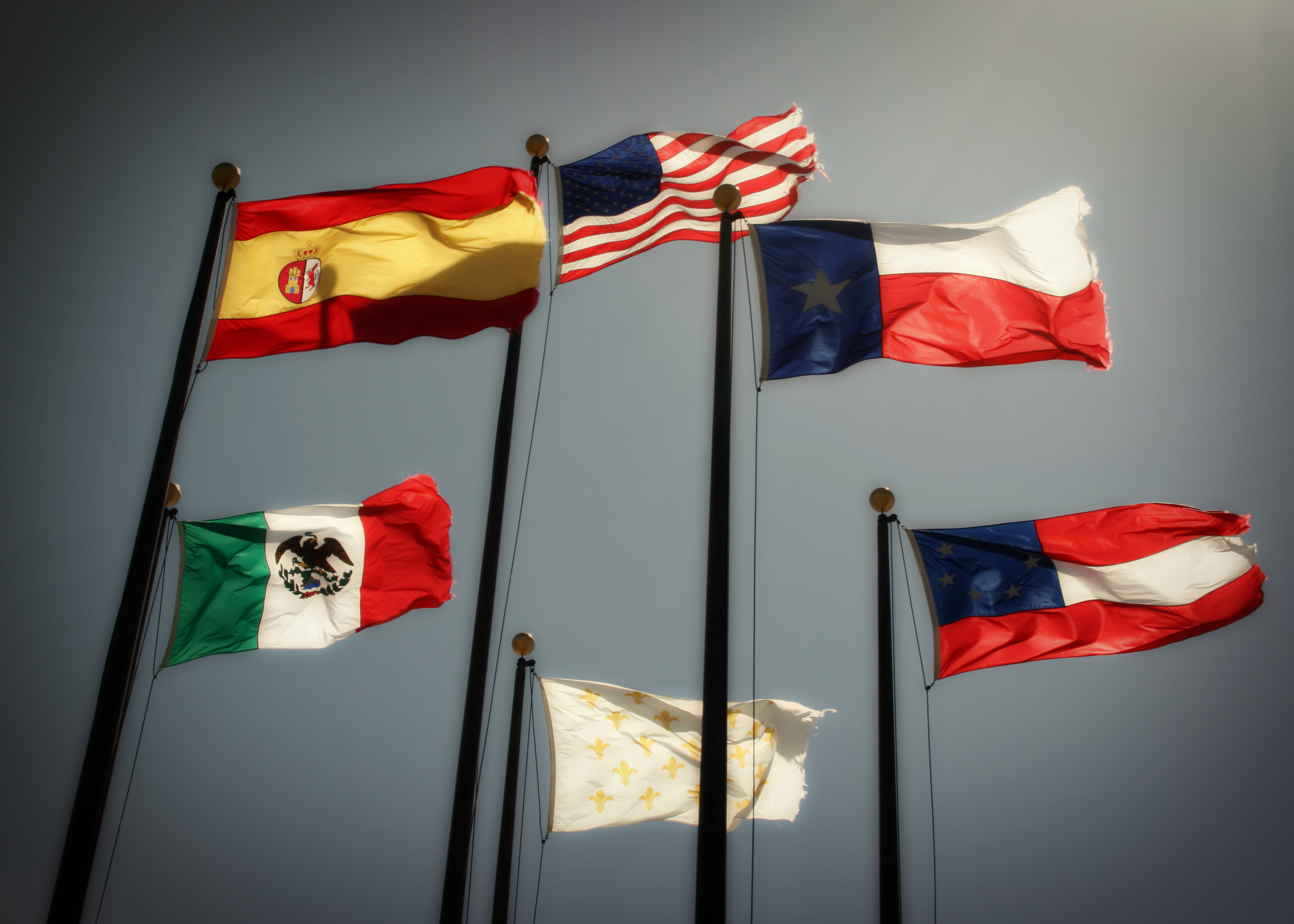
Six different national flags that have flown over Texas; clockwise from top: flag of the United States, flag of Texas, flag of the Confederate States of America, flag of the Kingdom of France, flag of Mexico, and flag of New Spain

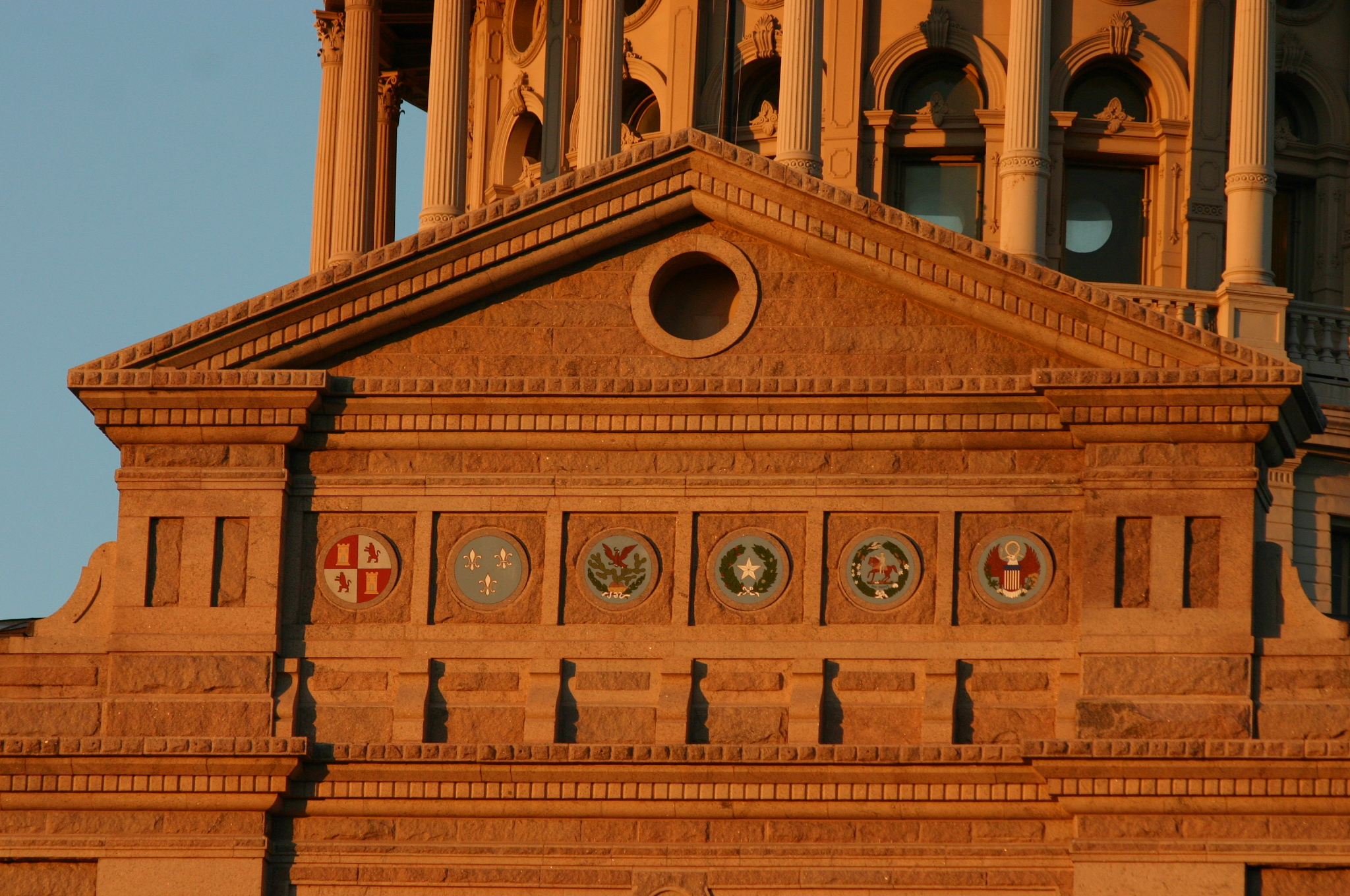
Six coats of arms displayed under the Texas State Capitol Dome (from left to right: Spanish, French, Mexican, Republic of Texas, Confederate States, and United States)

"Six flags over Texas" is the slogan used to describe the six countries that have had control over some or all of the current territory of the U.S. state of Texas: Spain (1519–1685; 1690–1821), France (1685–1690), Mexico (1821–1836), the Republic of Texas (1836–1845), the United States (1845–1861; 1865–present), and the Confederate States (1861–1865).

This slogan has been incorporated into shopping malls, theme parks (Six Flags, including the flagship park, Six Flags Over Texas, in Arlington), and other enterprises. The six flags fly in front of the state welcome centers on the state's borders with Arkansas, Louisiana, New Mexico, Mexico, and Oklahoma. In Austin, the six flags fly in front of the Bullock Texas State History Museum; the Texas State Capitol has the six coats of arms on its northern façade, and the University of Texas at Austin Life Sciences Library, previously the location of the central library in the Main Building, has each coat of arms displayed in plaster emblems with short excerpts representative of the constitutions of each country. The six flags are also shown on the reverse of the Seal of Texas.

In 1997, the Texas Historical Commission adopted standard designs for representing the six flags.

While six flags are universally accepted throughout the state, some controversy exists regarding a potential seventh: The Republic of the Rio Grande. Ultimately, the former nation is not included, but certain local governments such as the city of Laredo (which served as its capital city) hold it as a prominent member of the array. The reason why it is not considered one of the original "six flags" in the Texas set is because both the Republic of Texas and the Republic of the Rio Grande claimed part of the same territory in 1840.

In 2017, the Six Flags Over Texas theme park stopped flying the six flags and replaced them with six American flags, part of a larger trend of removing public symbols of the slavery-supporting secessionists.

== Spain (1519 to 1685; 1690 to 1821) ==

The first flag belonged to Spain, which ruled most of Texas from 1519 to 1685 and 1690 to 1821. Three Spanish flags were used during this period: the "castle and lion" arms of the Crown of Castile (see Flag of Castile and León); the Cross of Burgundy, a military and maritime flag also used by the viceroys of New Spain; and the Rojigualda introduced by King Charles III in 1785, containing horizontal stripes of red-gold-red and the simple arms of Castile and León. This third flag has been used by Spain in various forms to the present day, and is the flag used in the reverse of the Seal of Texas and adopted by the Texas Historical Commission.

== France (1685 to 1690 for Fort Saint Louis and 1800 to 1803 as French Louisiana) ==

The second flag was the royal banner of the Kingdom of France from 1685 to 1690. In 1685, French nobleman René-Robert Cavelier, Sieur de La Salle, founded a colony on the Texas Gulf Coast called Fort Saint Louis. The colony was unsuccessful, and after La Salle's murder, was soon abandoned. During this time, no official French flag existed, so a number of designs are used in displays of the "six flags".

Later on in 1800, Spain ceded Louisiana to France under the Third Treaty of San Ildefonso. French Louisiana included northern sections of Texas. It remained in the hands of France until 1803, when France sold the Louisiana Territory to the United States. However, what was later northern Texas was ceded back to Spain years later.

== Mexico (1821 to 1835) ==
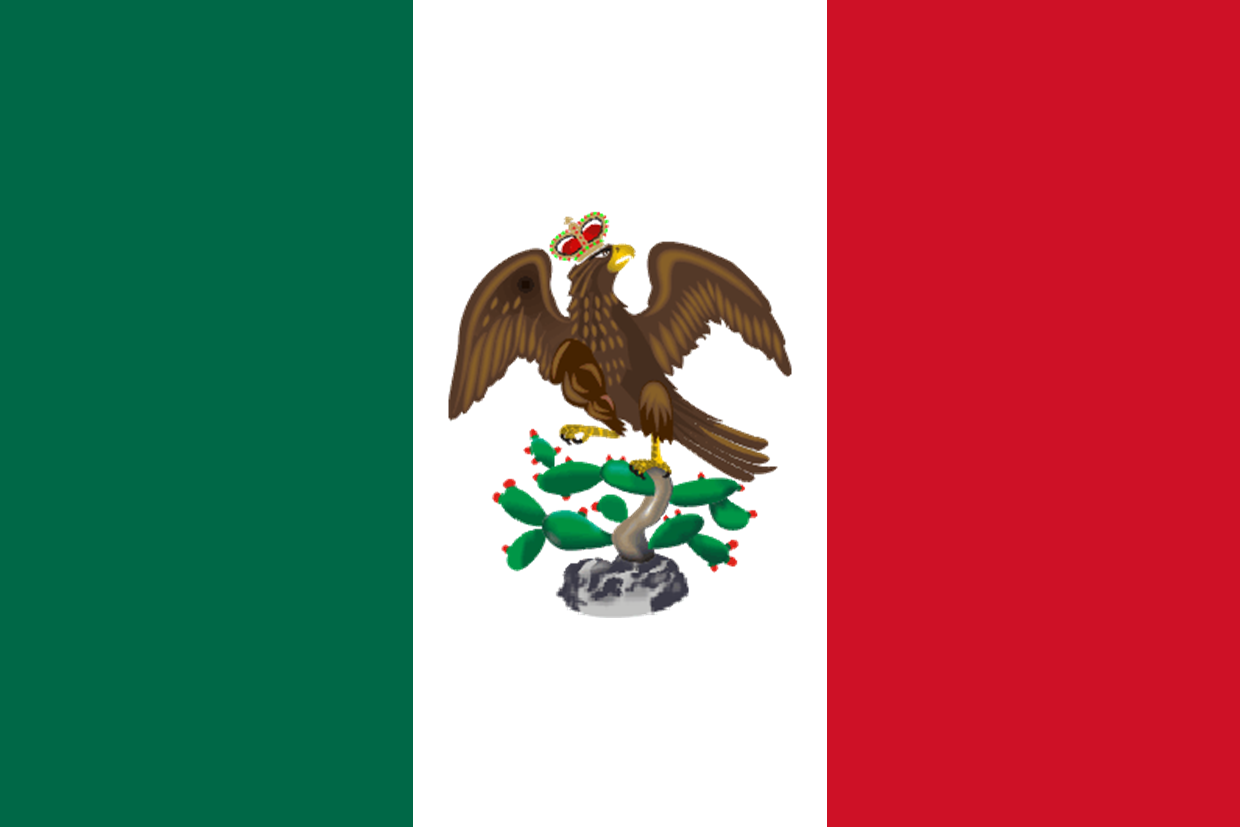

The third flag flown (1821 through 1836) was the flag of Mexico. Mexico's independence was recognized by Spain in September 1821. The Mexican flag displayed in the Austin Capitol is that of the Mexican Republic of 1823 through 1864.

This flag was in use in Texas until its independence from Mexico in 1836.

== Republic of Texas (1836 to 1845 as the Republic of Texas; since 1845 as the State of Texas) ==

The fourth flag belonged to the Republic of Texas from 1836 to 1845. The Republic had two national flags during its history, the first being the so-called "Burnet Flag". The "Lone Star Flag", the final national flag, became the state flag when Texas joined the United States as a U.S. state in 1845.

== United States (1845 to 1861; 1865 to present) ==

The fifth and current flag is that of the United States, which Texas joined in 1845. Upon secession, Texas abandoned this flag for its sixth, until readmission to the Union in 1865.

== Confederate States (1861 to 1865) ==

The sixth flag belonged to the Confederate States from 1861 to 1865. During this time, the Confederate States had three national flags, which the first one (Stars and Bars) is usually chosen for display.

== Gallery ==
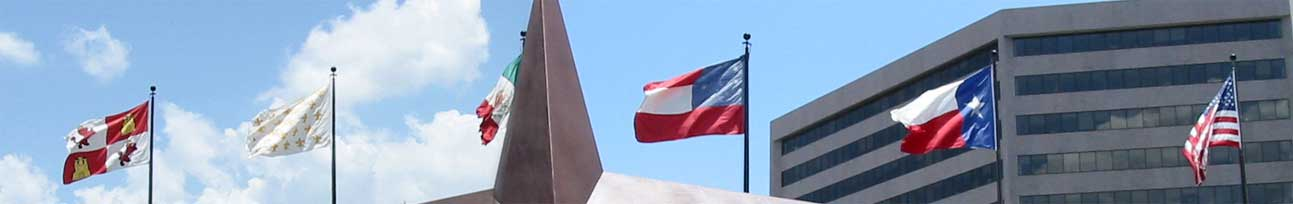
Display of the Six Flags in Austin, Texas

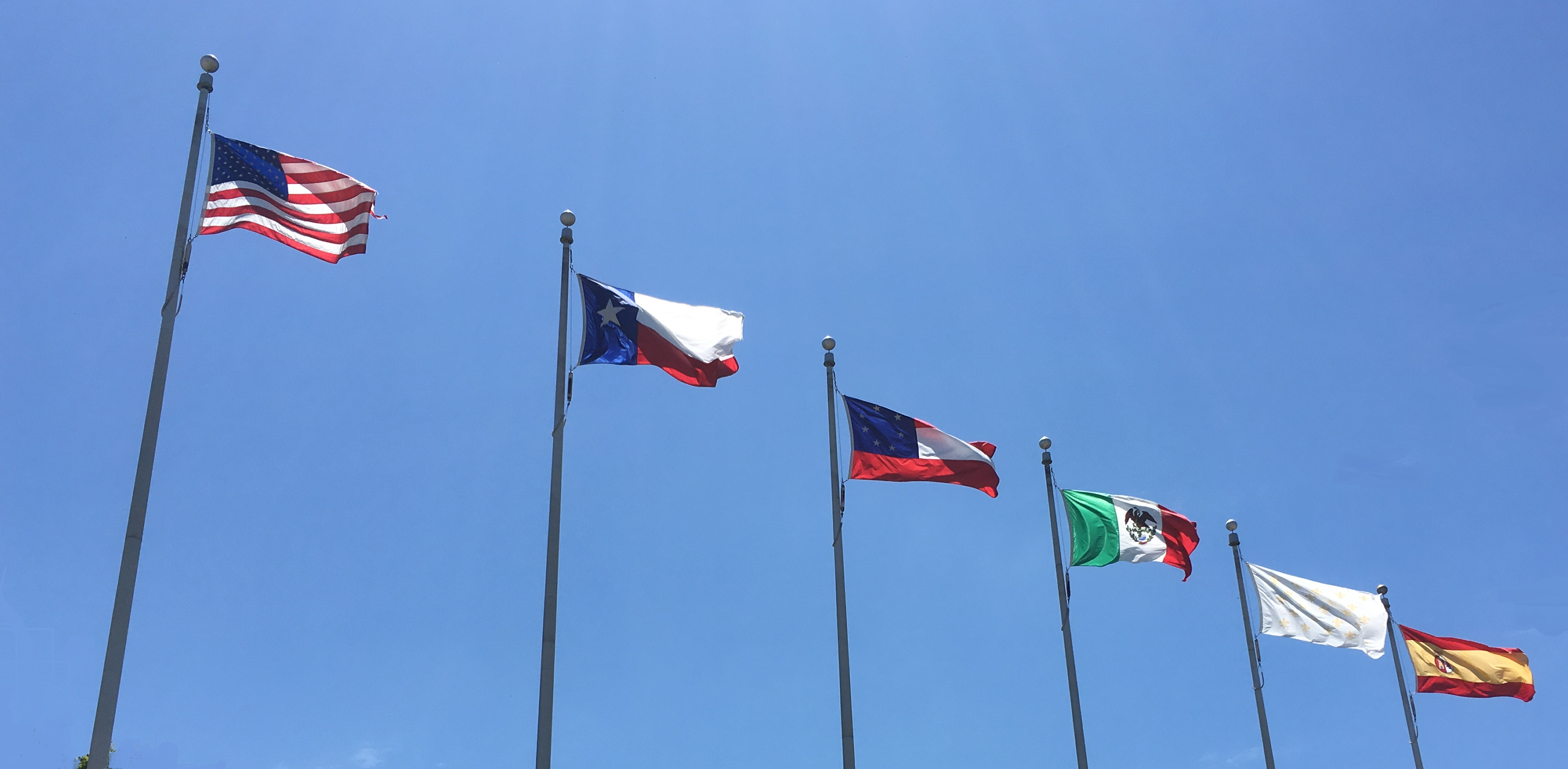

== See also ==
- History of Texas
- Flag of Laredo, Texas
- Flag of the Republic of the Rio Grande
- Burnet Flag
