= Seal of Texas =

Official government emblem of the U.S. state of Texas

Official seal of Texas

Versions
- Reverse (Note: Unlike the obverse side of the seal, the reverse is not used as a seal. However, it does appear on the Texas Legislative Medal of Honor)
- Armiger: State of Texas
- Adopted: 1845
- Motto: Remember the Alamo; Texas One and Indivisible

National Coat of Arms of Texas (1839-1845)

Versions
- State Coat of Arms of Texas (1992)

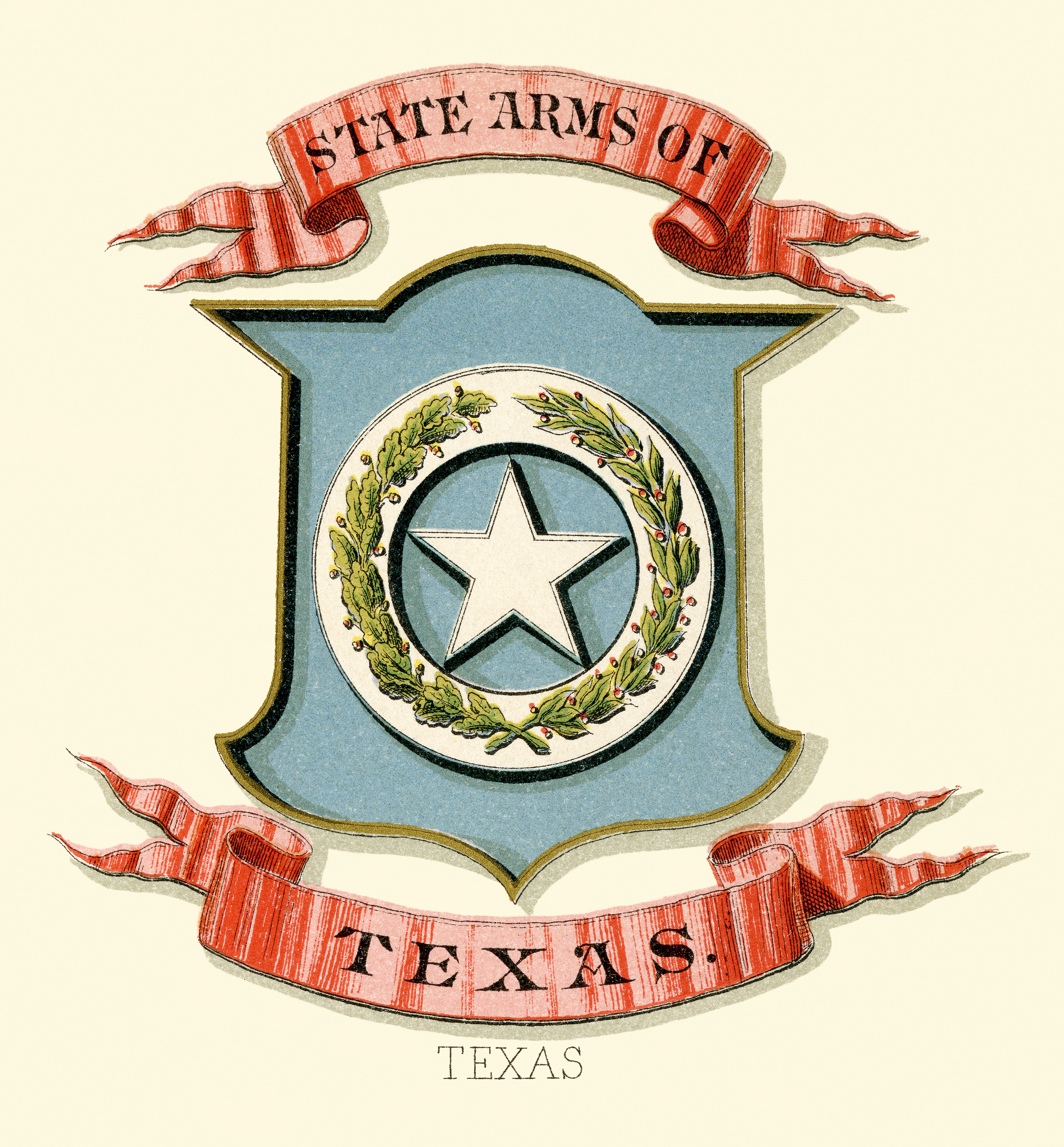
- Texas state historical coat of arms (illustrated, 1876)
- Armiger: State of Texas
- Adopted: 1845 (1839)

The seal of Texas was adopted through the 1845 Constitution of Texas, and was based on the seal of the Republic of Texas, which dates from January 25, 1839.

== Design ==
The official artwork, drawn by Juan Vega of Round Rock, Texas, was adopted in 1992 by Secretary of State John Hannah Jr. The seal has specified wording on both the obverse and reverse sides.

=== Obverse side ===
The Texas Constitution states, "There shall be a seal of the State, which shall be kept by the Governor and used by him officially. The seal shall have a star of five points, encircled by olive and live oak branches, and the words 'the State of Texas'". The design is similar to the coat of arms of Paraguay.

=== Reverse side ===
The reverse side of the seal was adopted in 1961 and has a more detailed design, which is similar to other coats of arms found in Latin America; The original 1961 act of legislature which established it was unusual in that the act did not actually define the reverse side and was simply a picture of the design; it was not until 1991 that the seal was actually defined in writing by law as follows:

[T]he design for the reverse side of the Great Seal of Texas shall consist of a shield, the lower half of which is divided into two parts; on the shield's lower left is a depiction of the cannon of the Battle of Gonzales; on the shield's lower right is a depiction of Vince's Bridge; on the upper half of the shield is a depiction of the Alamo; the shield is circled by live oak and olive branches, and the unfurled flags of the Kingdom of France, the Kingdom of Spain, the United Mexican States, the Republic of Texas, the Confederate States of America, and the United States of America; above the shield is emblazoned the motto, "REMEMBER THE ALAMO", and beneath the shield are the words, "TEXAS ONE AND INDIVISIBLE"; over the entire shield, centered between the flags, is a white five-pointed star.

The flags on the seal are the "six flags over Texas", of the six nations that have had sovereignty over some or all of the current territory of Texas. The original seal pictured in the 1961 act represented the C.S.A. with an Army of Tennessee Confederate battle flag; the 1991 law replaced this with the first C.S.A. flag, known as the "Stars and Bars".

== History ==
The seal of Texas has changed 5 times since independence from Mexico in 1836. The original Great Seal of the Republic was created on December 10, 1836, by the Congress, with a bill providing that "for the future the national seal of this republic shall consist of a single star, with the letters 'Republic of Texas', circular on said seal, which seal shall also be circular". After initial hopes for the quick annexation of Texas into the United States grew dim, the Third Congress modified the seal and created a national arms in 1839. The bill stated, "The national arms of the Republic of Texas be, and the same is hereby declared to be a white star of five points, on an azure ground, encircled by an olive and live oak branches", as well as that "The national great seal of this Republic shall, from and after the passage of this act, bear the arms of this nation ..., and the letters 'Republic of Texas'". When Texas joined the Union in 1845, the new state constitution retained the seal, changing only the word "Republic" to "State", and removed the background from the arms. It was not until 1992 that the seal and arms were standardized to reflect the specific language in the constitution and removing the various superfluous symbols and errors that were found on a majority of seals at the time. Despite this as of 2017 a majority of state offices use seals based on older unstandardized seals with post oak leaves instead of the specified live oak leaves.

=== The 1956 Martinez Art ===
On November 19, 1946, the Pentagon's National Guard Bureau advised all states that the United States Air Force wanted state national guard aircraft to have identifying insignia on the fuselage. The Texas Adjutant General's Department decided to use the state seal as the identifying insignia. The department's chief engineer, Colonel Maybin H. Wilson, researched the design of the seal with the assistance of Werner W. Dornberger, an architectural engineering professor at the University of Texas; Bertha Brandt, assistant archivist of the state library; and Dorman Winfrey, archivist of the University of Texas. In 1956, Octavio A. Martinez, an architectural engineering student at the University of Texas, prepared an eighteen-and-three-fourths-inch watercolor of the seal. This design was faithful to the constitutional description and omitted erroneous details that had crept into the seal over the years, such as the addition of stars and diamonds in the bottom of the seal's outer ring and the use of post oak leaves instead of live oak leaves. The original Martinez watercolor has been lost.

First Great Seal of the Republic, 1836–1839

Second Great Seal of the Republic, 1839–1845

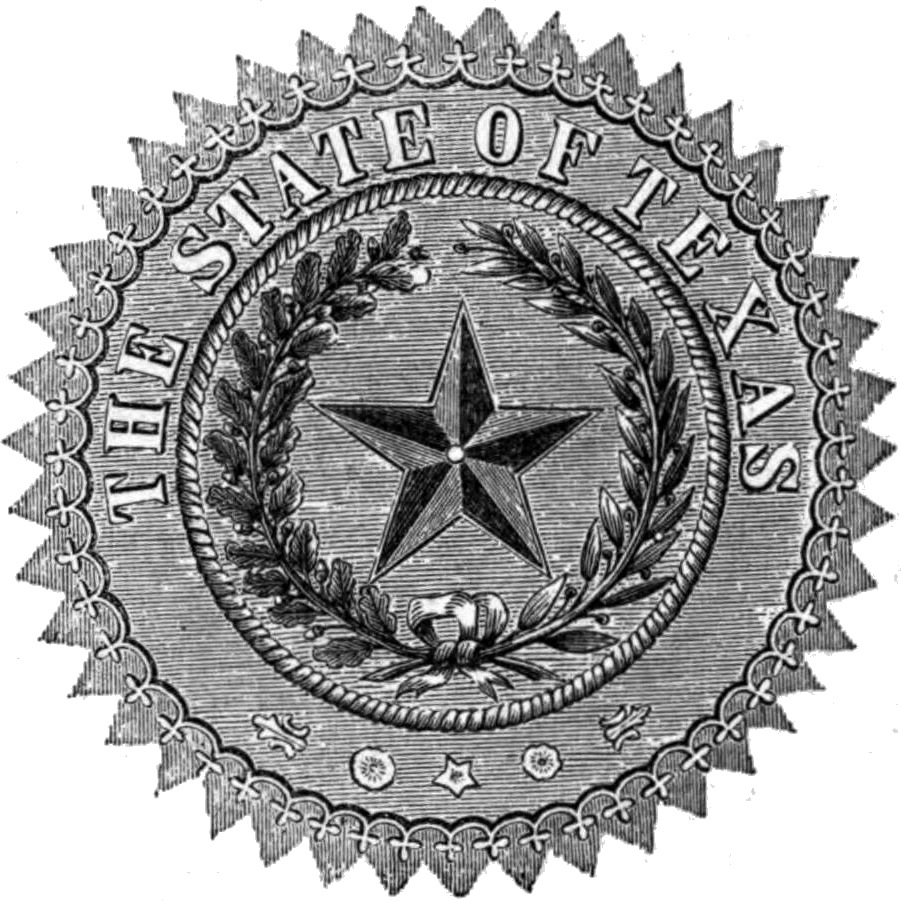
Seal of the State of Texas (1879)

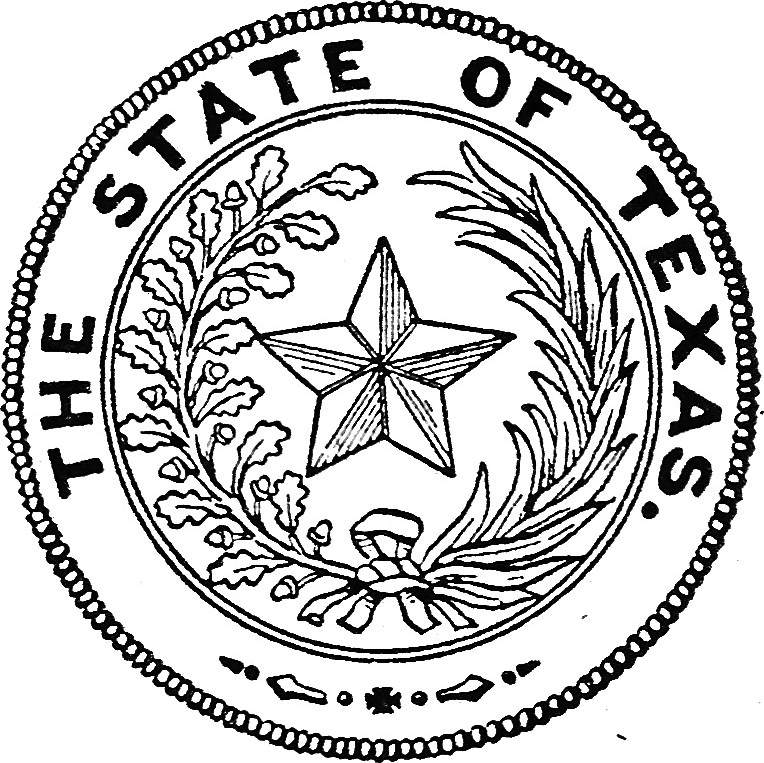
Seal of the State of Texas (1909)

Unstandardized version with post oak leaves instead of live oak leaves.

=== Government seals of Texas ===
There are also numerous seals of the different departments of Texas government, including seals for the governor and lieutenant governor. They are all based upon the state seal of Texas.

Seal of the governor of Texas

Seal of the lieutenant governor of Texas

Seal of the Senate of Texas

Seal of the Texas House of Representatives

Seal of the Texas attorney general

Seal of the Texas secretary of state

== County symbols ==
General state law does not require counties to adopt a seal. However, laws do provide seals for the County Commissioners' Court, County Clerk, and other county offices. Until 1975, the Commissioners' Court seal consisted of a star with five points and the words, "Commissioners Court, ---- County, Texas". A Commissioners' Court may now select its own seal design, with the approval of the Texas Secretary of State.

Counties commonly have a seal or symbol to identify the county unofficially. Many have adopted symbols with the lone star and live oak/olive branches in the center. Some counties have maintained "The State of Texas" at the top, while adding the county name below, while others have replaced "The State of Texas" with the county name, with some adding the year of county establishment at the bottom.

Notable exceptions include Harris County (which uses a symbol with the flag of Texas in the center) and Collin County (which uses a Texas Flag in a stylized C).

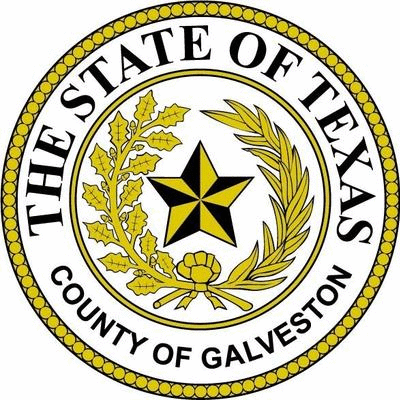
Seal of Galveston County

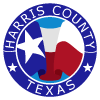
Seal of Harris County

Seal of Webb County

Seal of Collin County

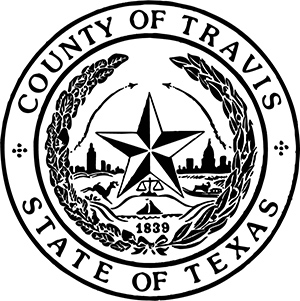
Seal of Travis County

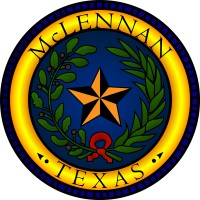
Seal of McLennan County

== See also ==
- Coats of arms of the U.S. states
- Seal (emblem)
