= Ráfael Vásquez (general) =

Mexican general (1804–1854)

Rafael Vásquez (1804 – March 9, 1854) was a Mexican military officer who was a general in the Mexican Army during the Mexican rebellion against the centralist style rule of government.

== Early life ==
Vásquez was born in 1804, in Mexico City. His first military endeavor was on February 20, 1827, as Captain of Patriots of the Hacienda de Ciénega de Mata, Jalisco, Mexico. He was appointed brevet brigadier general in 1839.

== Career ==
Vásquez was a major figure in the suppression of the Mexican insurgents, who opposed the centralization of the Mexican government under General Antonio López de Santa Anna. The states of Coahuila, Nuevo León, and Tamaulipas had advocated rebellion and sought secession from Mexico and declared a new Republic of the Rio Grande. Vásquez led a force to subdue Antonio Canales Rosillo and his Texan - Mexican troops into an ambush near Saltillo, Mexico. Assisting Canales was Colonel Samuel W. Jordan. Jordan led a group of federalist troops that had secretly been infiltrated by centralist supporters. However, he still managed to rout the centralists forces who quickly fled to Saltillo.

On March 5, 1842, General Vásquez invaded Texas with about 700 men and occupied San Antonio, Texas. The Texan forces were surprised and overwhelmed. After a few skirmishes, they were unable to defend the town and evacuated to Seguin, Texas. Vásquez deemed it a surrender and took control of San Antonio. He raised the Mexican flag and thus declared Mexican laws in effect. On March 7, Vásquez fled San Antonio, while pursued by Texan forces. He crossed the Rio Grande and returned to Mexico. The Vásquez expedition was one of the events that led to retaliations by the Texans through the Mier Expedition and Somervell Expedition.

== Later life ==
In 1851 and 1852, Vásquez was commandant general of the state of Jalisco, Mexico. He died on March 9, 1854, in Mexico City.
