= Manuel María de Llano =

Mexican separatist politician

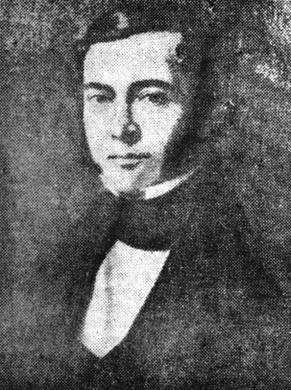
Manuel María de Llano

Manuel María de Llano Lozano (1799–1863) was a separatist politician and liberal who governed Nuevo León, Mexico, from 1839 to 1845.

He was born in the city of Monterrey on May 23, 1799, to Pedro Manuel de Llano, a locally known politician, and his wife, María de Jesús Lozano. At 27 years he was elected mayor of the city with the condition that he would renounce after a few months to assume a federal dispute for Nuevo León to Congress of the Union. Upon his return to Monterrey he founded the newspaper El Antagonista, which was the first independent paper in that region. Later, he was elected governor of the state after the resignation of Manuel Gómez de Castro, causing local controversy and remaining in the position from 1839 to 1845.

During his term as governor he confronted the Catholic Church about various affairs of social interest such as the mandatory pricing of the public for ecclesiastic services and the building of public schools financed by the government. He afterwards headed the defense of the state capital from the U.S. invasion of 1846.

De Llano was characterized as a sympathetic liberal politician with an independent feeling for his region. He introduced various well-known controversial regionalist like Santiago Vidaurri to his political team. On January 17, 1840, as state governor, he declared Nuevo León independent from Mexico and set the goal of eventually joining the states of Coahuila and Tamaulipas in the Republic of the Rio Grande; however the rebellion collapsed within the year.

He died in Monterrey on March 1, 1863 at 64 years of age.
