= Morelos, Coahuila =

City in the Mexican state of Coahuila

Morelos
- Municipal seat and city
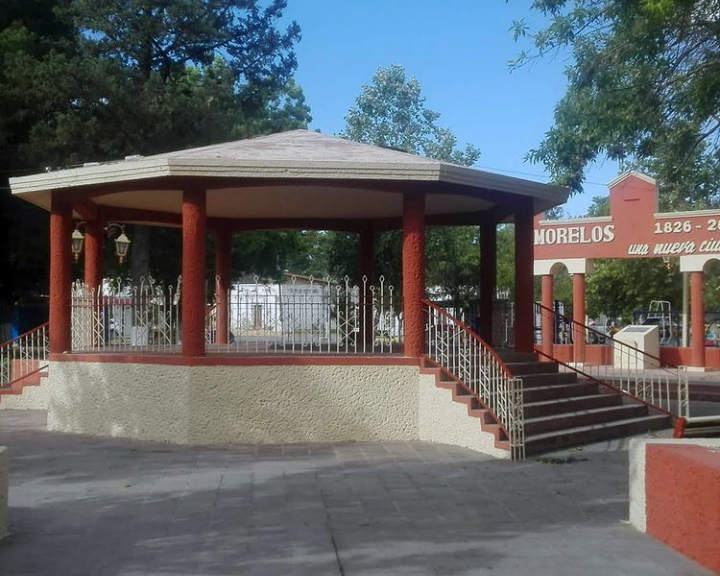
- Kiosk in Morelos, Coahuila

- Location in Mexico
- Coordinates: 28°24′27″N 100°53′08″W
- Country: Mexico
- State: Coahuila
- Municipality: Morelos

Population (2005)
  - Density: 1.4/km^{2} (3.6/sq mi)
  - Urban density: 1.2/km^{2} (3.1/sq mi)
  - Metro: 1,395,000
  - Metro density: 3.4/km^{2} (8.8/sq mi)
- Time zone: UTC–06:00 (Zona Centro)
  - Summer (DST): UTC–05:00 (DST)

Morelos is a city and seat of the municipality of Morelos, in the north-eastern Mexican state of Coahuila.
