= Republic of the Rio Grande =

Federalist revolt on the lower Rio Grande, 1838–1840

Coordinates: 27°31′N 99°29′W

Provisional Government of the Northern Frontier Gobierno Provisional de la Frontera del Norte (Spanish)
- 1840
- Flag

- Status: Provisional Junta; status as a state disputed
- Capital: Claimed Laredo; working seat Guerrero
- Common languages: Spanish
- Government: Federal presidential republic (Note: The 1824 constitution of Mexico that these sources refer to established Mexico as a federation under the presidential system, thus making the Republic of the Rio Grande a federal presidential republic.) under a provisional junta
- President
  - 1840: Jesús de Cárdenas
- History
  - Convention at Casa Blanca: 23 January 1840
  - Surrender of Antonio Canales in Camargo: 6 November 1840
Preceded by
| Coahuila |
| Nuevo León |
| Tamaulipas |
| Republic of Texas |
Succeeded by
| Coahuila |
| Nuevo León |
| Tamaulipas |
| Republic of Texas |
- Today part of: Mexico (Coahuila, Nuevo León and Tamaulipas); United States (Texas)

The Republic of the Rio Grande (Spanish: República del Río Grande) is the name given by the Anglo-American press, and later by much of the historiography that followed it, to a federalist revolt and provisional government in northeastern Mexico between 1838 and 1840. On 23 January 1840 a junta meeting at Casa Blanca, on the Nueces River, headed by Antonio Canales Rosillo, Jesús de Cárdenas and others, withdrew recognition from the centralist government in Mexico City, installed the Provisional Government of the Northern Frontier of the Mexican Republic, and summoned a convention of the states to restore the federal system. It is commonly compared to the Republic of Texas as a separatist project, yet the leaders’ own documents use the terms frontera del norte, villas del norte and gobierno provisional: they neither employ the name of a republic nor speak of independence. The revolt ended with the agreement signed at Camargo on 6 November 1840, ratified by Canales and approved by General Mariano Arista.

== Background ==
After a decade of strife, Mexico won its independence from the Spanish Empire in 1821. After a failed attempt at a monarchy, Mexico adopted a new constitution, the 1824 Constitution. This new constitution established los Estados Unidos Mexicanos, or "the United Mexican States," as a federal republic.

Congress, sitting as a constituent body after the Plan of Cuernavaca, abolished the federal system on 23 October 1835. The Siete Leyes, the centralist constitution, were published on 30 December 1836 under the interim president José Justo Corro. States became departments, with appointed governors and departmental juntas.

On the northeast side the grievances were the loss of local fiscal control and little help against Comanche and Lipan raids. Northern federalists wanted the appointed officials out and the charter of 1824. These years saw federalist risings from Sonora to Tampico headed by General José de Urrea.

== Rebellion in the villas del norte ==
=== Initial pronunciamientos and fighting ===
On 9 November 1838, residents of Camargo, joined by representatives from Reynosa, Mier, Guerrero and Matamoros, issued a pronunciamiento bearing 538 signatures. It demanded restoration of the federal system, protection of persons and property, and a return to the fiscal and political conditions that had existed before 1835. The document adhered to the earlier act of the Tampico garrison and invited General Pedro Lemus to assume command; in the interim, Colonel Eleuterio Méndez directed operations.

On 22 November Vicente Filísola, commander of the Ejército del Norte summoned elected representatives from Laredo, Guerrero, Mier, Camargo, Reynosa and Matamoros to the Puntiagudo ranch. Among those present were Antonio Canales Rosillo, Antonio Zapata Rocha, Juan N. Margáin and Manuel de la Viña. He offered amnesty if they returned home. The delegates replied that legal channels had already failed, that they had taken up arms solely to be heard, and that the new contribution law of 9 June was impossible to meet. They pledged not to attack government forces unless those forces advanced against them, and gave the general twelve days to reply.

Canales remained in arms and began recruiting Texian volunteers. President Mirabeau B. Lamar refused official involvement but permitted private recruitment. In the spring of 1839 the federalists sent Juan Pablo Anaya to Texas and New Orleans for men and arms. After crossing at Laredo he reached San Antonio on 26 August. The Telegraph and Texas Register reported that Anaya claimed the federalist party could form a government for six or seven northern states. Anaya publicly denied this the next day, stating that he sought only the 1824 charter, modified by a national convention. On 13 December he issued the Plan Federalista from New Orleans; the Spanish paper, Correo de la Luisiana of 15 January 1840 later published land-offer circulars over his signature.

On 3–4 October 1839 the federalists were camped at Alcantra on the Alamo River, about twelve miles from Mier. Francisco González Pavón advanced from Mier with roughly 500 men and four artillery pieces. Canales, accompanied by Reuben Ross’s Texian volunteers, pursued him. Pavón charged three times, exhausted his water supply, and surrendered on the 4th. Neighboring towns on the river bank sent men and supplies to the rebels. Canales declined to attack Matamoros, where Valentín Canalizo held a larger force. Near Monterrey, Mariano Arista bought off part of the federalist following; Ross withdrew with a body of Texians. Among the wounded that year was José María Jesús Carbajal, who permanently lost the use of his left arm.

=== Provisional government of 1840 ===
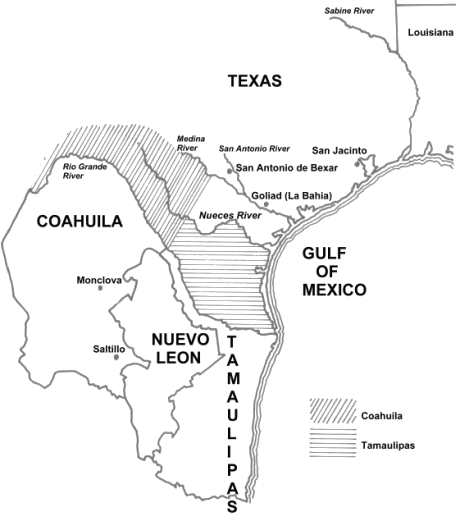
The strip between the Nueces and the Grande, claimed by the Republic of Texas since 1836 and administered by Mexico as part of Tamaulipas and Coahuila. Canales refused to cede any of it and never consented to the Texas flag south of the Nueces.

On 17 January 1840 notables from Tamaulipas, Nuevo León and Coahuila assembled at the Oreveña ranch near Laredo. A subsequent meeting at Casa Blanca produced the articles of 23 January. The departmental congresses refused to endorse the movement and requested troops from Mexico City.

The Casa Blanca articles claimed no new territory and created no independent state. They simply denied the legitimacy of the Mexico City government over the national territory and declared that “the inhabitants of the frontier would continue fighting until a convention of all the states restored the federal system.” A provisional junta, with a president and council was installed with authority to raise an army and navy and summoned a national convention for 28 May or earlier.

When Arista forwarded the documents he sarcastically listed the members of “that farce of a government”: Jesús de Cárdenas as president, with Francisco Vidaurri, Juan Molano, Policarpo Martínez, Juan Margáin and N. Hinojosa as council directors.

Later compilations add Canales as army commander, Manuel María de Llano as councilor for Nuevo León, and Juan Francisco de Farías and later José María Jesús Carbajal as secretary. Laredo was named capital, but the printing press and the working sessions of the junta were actually located in Guerrero.

=== Origin of the name ===
Historian Josefina Zoraida Vázquez has shown that the name “Republic of the Rio Grande” originated in the Anglo-American press, not in the documents of the rebels themselves, citing an August 1839 edition of the New Orleans Louisianan suggesting that Texas should “give birth to a new federative republic… the North Mexican Republic” a barrier between itself and Mexico, and the 3 March 1840 edition of the Houston Morning Star where a letter from the Serbian-born Texas settler George Fisher discussed the advantages to Texas of a “Republic of Rio Grande.”

None of the junta’s own papers use that name or speak of independence. Cárdenas’s letterhead in the Correo del Río Bravo del Norte read “president of the northern frontier of the Mexican Republic.” In the summer of 1840, when Henry Karnes offered Texian aid only on condition that the northern bank of the Rio Grande be occupied under the Texas flag, Canales replied that “his people had not taken up arms to sell, cede or deliver the territory to foreigners” and that he had never consented to that flag beyond the old provincial limits.

Later research, notably Paul D. Lack’s work based on the Nuevo León and Coahuila archives, reached the same conclusion: the name is an Anglo-American invention and does not appear in the junta’s records.

The name first appears in Mexico itself only during the Mexican–American War, when Isaac Neville Fleeson printed a bilingual sheet in occupied Matamoros titled Republic of Rio Grande, and Friend of the People / República de Río Grande y amiga de los pueblos.

=== Battle of Santa Rita de Morelos (March 24–25, 1840) ===
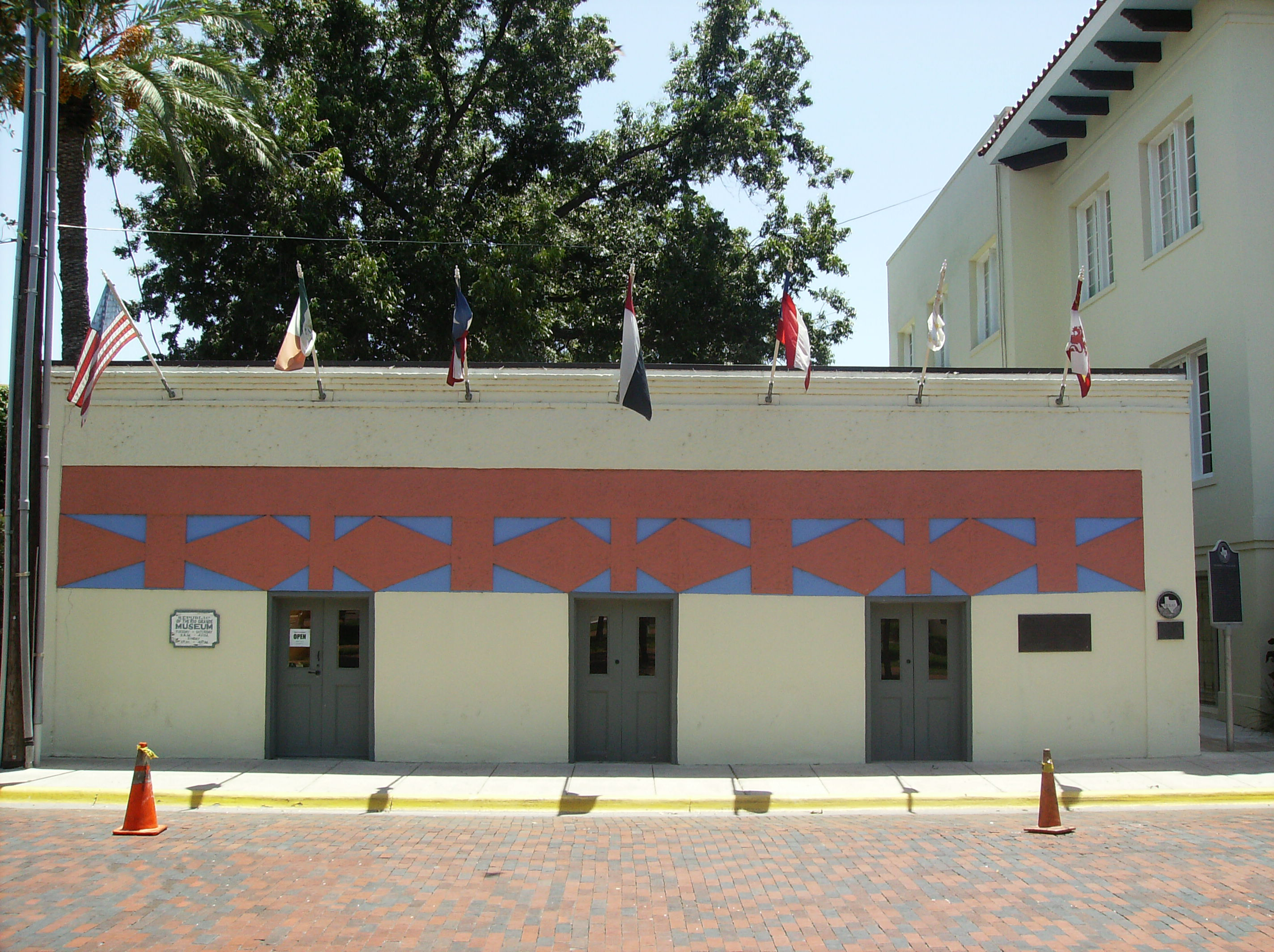
The Republic of the Rio Grande Museum, Laredo, in a house built about 1830 for Bartolomé García. Local tradition calls it the capital. A meeting is placed in Laredo, but the Junta sat and printed in Guerrero, Tamaulipas

Word came that Arista was in the valley. Samuel W. Jordan urged a retreat into beyond the Nueces to raise more volunteers. Canales refused; Jordan and about sixty men left. Cárdenas and the civilian officers went to Victoria, Texas. Arista caught Canales at Santa Rita de Morelos and defeated him on 24–25 March 1840. The act by which Guerrero returned to obedience explicitly credited Arista’s forces with “the destruction of the revolution” at that place. Antonio Zapata was captured. Arista’s report to the Minister of War states that Zapata requested a parley before the final assault and claimed Canales would surrender if asked. A court-martial condemned him; he was shot at 10 a.m. on 29 March. Pedro de Ampudia carried the head to Guerrero, where it was displayed in the plaza for three days. The parish priest José Antonio de la Peña Berástegui buried it on 12 April and recorded the cause of death as “executed.” Unsubstantiated Texian accounts differ, claiming Zapata was later shot in Monclova together with twenty-two of his men after refusing a pardon. Canales himself was defeated between San Fernando and fled across the river.

=== Battle of Saltillo (October 25, 1840) ===
Canales regrouped a mixed force at San Patricio which included Carrizo and Texian volunteers and retook Laredo, Guerrero, Mier and Camargo. He then dispatched about 350 men, Texians under Jordan, who had re-joined and Mexicans under Juan Nepomuceno Molano into the interior. On 29 September they occupied Ciudad Victoria after the departmental authorities abandoned it. That same day Molano wrote the prefect Luis Pérez asking the local junta to choose between the 1824 and 1836 constitutions; on 1 October the junta declared for 1824 with reforms. On 20 September Molano had already informed the prefect of Linares that the federal constitutional order had been restored.

Molano’s correspondence also records the growing break with the Texian auxiliaries. On 11 October Arista wrote to him stating that Canales' forces were already dispersed and that the only remaining choices were death or abandoning the foreigners; he offered to overlook the alliance. Molano replied the next day from Palmillas that bringing the Texians had been the worst act of the federalists and that he and his officers hated them. On 28 October at Saltillo he signed terms whose first article declared that the signatories were Mexicans who loved their country and had never intended to rebel against it or to recognize Texian independence. On 25 October, in a ravine near Saltillo, Jordan occupied a hacienda, held it briefly, and then withdrew toward Texas. The official report of José Cayetano de Montoya, commander of Saltillo stated that the Mexican officers had already agreed to abandon him.

== Defeat ==
After the Saltillo campaign Canales opened negotiations with Arista. The agreement was signed on the right bank of the river, at Camargo at 2 a.m. on 6 November 1840 by Cayetano Montero, José María Carrasco, Francisco Sepiafino, Juan N. Margáin, Manuel de la Viña and Rafael Quintero. Canales and Isidro Reyes ratified it; Arista approved it at Cadereyta on the 8th.

Article 1 stated that, the frontier being exposed to foreign vengeance, “the federalists of these departments sacrifice before the supreme government of their country their previous aspirations.” Article 4 placed the federalist forces at the disposal of the supreme government. Article 8 referred to the obligations of “the so called provisional government”, not of any republic, and ordered the rifles and powder purchased by that government to be turned over to the army stores. Canales entered the regular army. Cárdenas did not sign; he had been in Victoria since March. No document records the place of his formal submission. On 23 March 1846, writing from Santa Rita as prefect of the northern district of Tamaulipas, he protested the advance of Zachary Taylor.

Canales later fought Texian incursions, including the Mier expedition of 1842 and, as a government general in 1851–52, suppressed Carbajal’s Plan de la Loba on the same river.

== Flag ==
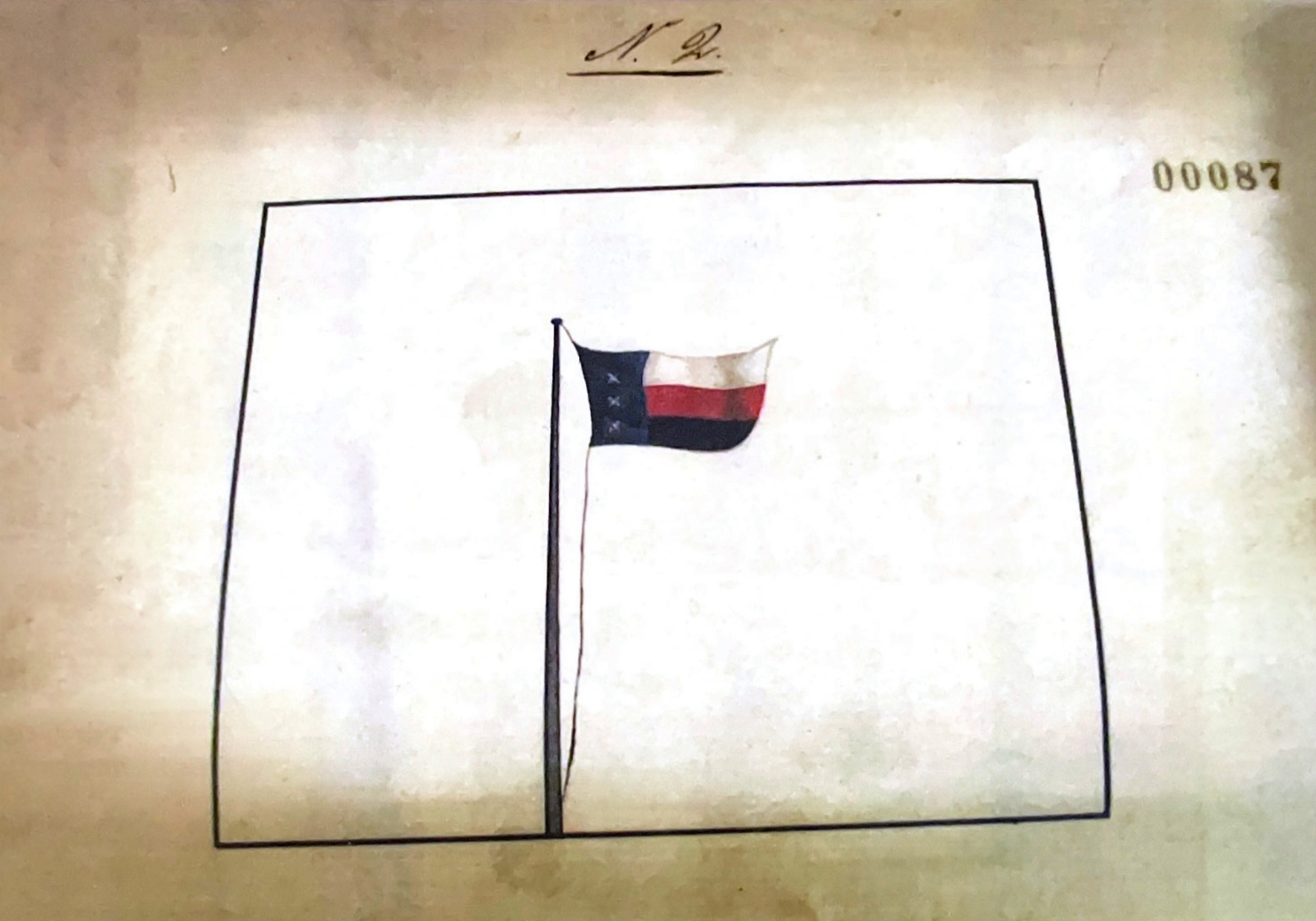
A sketch from 1840 created by a Centralist spy in the Federalist army camp of Jose Carbajal. After the defeat at Santa Rita de Morelos, General Arista forwarded the sketch to the Minister of War

The flag used by the movement has a blue hoist with three white stars run evenly along the hoist The fly is split into three bands, one white, one red, and one black. Researcher Juan José Gallegos notes that the three stars and bands might be read as Coahuila, Nuevo León and Tamaulipas.

== Legacy ==
Remnants of the revolt's effect can be seen mostly in Texas. It left almost no institutional or political legacy in Mexico and is remembered there, when at all, as one more federalist revolt. The remnants can be seen in:

- Zapata County, Texas, as well as the city of Zapata are named in honor of cavalry commander, Colonel Antonio Zapata Rocha.
- The purported capital building now housing the Republic of the Rio Grande Capitol Building Museum is located in Laredo, Texas.
- As an addition to the historical six flags over Texas, the Laredo Morning Times newspaper adds a seventh flag to its banner: the flag for the Republic of the Rio Grande.

== See also ==
- Centralist Republic of Mexico
- Siete Leyes
- Revolts against the Centralist Republic of Mexico
- Antonio Canales Rosillo
- Mariano Arista
- José María Jesús Carbajal

== Bibliography ==
- Vázquez, Josefina Zoraida (1986). "La supuesta República del Río Grande". Historia Mexicana (El Colegio de México) 36 (1): 49–80. Online. PDF via Colmex repository.
- Olavarría y Ferrari, Enrique de (1888). "Tomo IV: México Independiente". In Vicente Riva Palacio, ed. México a través de los siglos. Mexico City: Ballescá y Cía. Editores; Barcelona: Espasa y Compañía. Online at Internet Archive.
- de la Garza, Beatriz E. (2013). ''From the Republic of the Rio Grande: A Personal History of the Place and the People''. Austin: University of Texas Press. ISBN 978-0-292-74521-0.
