= Antonio Canales Rosillo =

Mexican military officer

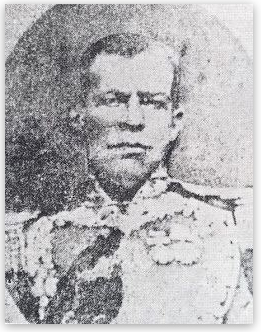
- Born: 1802; Monterrey, Nuevo León, Viceroyalty of New Spain
- Died: 1852 (aged 49–50); Camargo, Tamaulipas, Mexico
- Military career
- Allegiance: Mexico; Republic of the Rio Grande
- Branch: Mexican Army; Army of the Republic of the Rio Grande
- Rank: Brigadier General (Mexico); Commander-in-chief (Rio Grande)
- Nickname: El Zorro del Chaparral
- Conflicts: Rio Grande Rebellion; Battle of Santa Rita de Morelos; Battle of Saltillo; Battle of Monterrey; Battle of Matamoros; Mexican–American War; Battle of Palo Alto; Battle of Buena Vista; Battle of Monterrey

Antonio Canales Rosillo (1802 in Monterrey, Nuevo León – 1852 in Camargo, Tamaulipas) was a 19th-century Mexican politician, surveyor, and military officer also known for co-founding the short-lived Republic of the Rio Grande.

== Military career ==
Canales fought in the Apache wars in Mexico and fought under the many conservative attempts to control the Mexican national government of the 19th century. Canales was in discord with President Antonio López de Santa Anna's Centralist move against the Mexican Constitution of 1824.

He served as commander-in-chief of the army of the rebellion and, along with José María Jesús Carbajal, sought to establish the Republic of the Rio Grande during the short existence of that entity in 1840. After a portion of his army was captured, Canales eventually abandoned the cause of the rebellion and received a commission as Brigadier General in the Mexican Army.

In 1842, he led campaigns against the Texans at Corpus Christi, Texas, and Fort Lipantitlán near San Patricio, Texas, and participated in capturing the Mier Expedition at Ciudad Mier.

Later, Canales badgered the U.S. troops stationed between Corpus Christi and Matamoros during the Mexican–American War. He participated in the battles at Resaca de Guerrero - Palo Alto. He served under General Pedro de Ampudia at Cerralvo, Nuevo León, and under Santa Anna during the Battle of Buena Vista. It was during this war, in 1846, when he earned the nickname he was very proud of, El Zorro del Chaparral (The Fox of the chaparral).

He also participated in other rebellions under the patronage of the governor of Coahuila and later of Nuevo León, Santiago Vidaurri.

Some sources cite Canales as one of the Mexican filibusters.

Some sources say that he died in 1852 after leading the government forces that suppressed a rebellion in Camargua; other sources say that he died in his house in Miquihuana, Tamaulipas on January 19, 1869 and that his remains were buried in the church of San Juan Bautista de Miquihuana.
