= List of Alamo defenders =

Alamo combatants

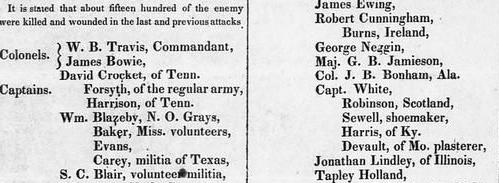
Partial scan of the March 24, 1836 Telegraph and Texas Register with the first Texian list of defenders killed at the Battle of the Alamo

The Battle of the Alamo (February 23 – March 6, 1836) was a crucial conflict of the Texas Revolution. In 1835, colonists from the United States joined with Tejanos (Mexicans born in Texas) in putting up armed resistance to the centralization of the Mexican government. President Antonio López de Santa Anna and the government in Mexico City believed the United States had instigated the insurrection with a goal of annexing Texas.

In an effort to tamp down on the unrest, martial law was declared and military governor General Martín Perfecto de Cos established headquarters in San Antonio de Béxar, stationing his troops at the Alamo. When the Texian volunteer soldiers gained control of the fortress at the Siege of Béxar, compelling Cos to surrender on December 9, many saw his expulsion to the other side of the Rio Grande as the end of Mexican forces in Texas. Most Texian soldiers in Béxar left to join a planned invasion of Matamoros, Mexico.

Garrison commander James C. Neill went home on family matters February 11, 1836, leaving James Bowie and William B. Travis as co-commanders over the predominantly volunteer force. When the Mexican Army of Operations under the command of Santa Anna arrived in Béxar with 1,500 troops on February 23, the remaining Alamo garrison numbered 150. (Note: "The enemy in large force is in sight. We want men and provisions. Send them to us. We have 150 men and are determined to defend the Alamo to the last. Give us assistance. (signed) William Barret Travis, February 23, 1836". Letter to Gonzales alcalde Andrew Ponton. Groneman (2001), p. 1; The Alamo was under Sam Houston's authority as commander-in-chief of the paid army, which included Neill, Bowie, Travis and Crockett. Until March 4, Houston's authority did not extend to volunteers and local militias, which were the majority of the fighting force inside the Alamo. Hatch (1999), p. 188.) Over the course of the next several days, new volunteers arrived inside the fortress while others were sent out as couriers, to forage for food, or to buy supplies.

A fierce defense was launched from within the walls, even as Bowie and Travis made unsuccessful attempts to negotiate with the Mexican army. Travis repeatedly dispatched couriers with pleas for reinforcements. Although Santa Anna refused to consider a proposed conditional surrender, he extended an offer of amnesty for all Tejanos inside the fortress to walk away unharmed. Most Tejanos evacuated from the fortress about February 25, either as part of the amnesty, or as a part of Juan Seguín's company of courier scouts on their last run. (Note: Some Tejanos were part of the Bexar military garrison, but others were part of Seguin's volunteer scout company and were in the Alamo on or before February 23. Enrique Esparza, who was inside the fortress as the son of defender Gregorio Esparza, later recalled that Santa Anna offered a three-day amnesty to all Tejano defenders. According to Esparza, Tejanos discussed the matter with Bowie who advised them to take the amnesty. It is believed most of the Tejanos left when Seguin did, either as couriers or because of the amnesty. Poyo (1996), pp. 53, 58 "Efficient in the Cause" (Stephen L. Hardin); Lindley (2003), pp. 94, 134.)

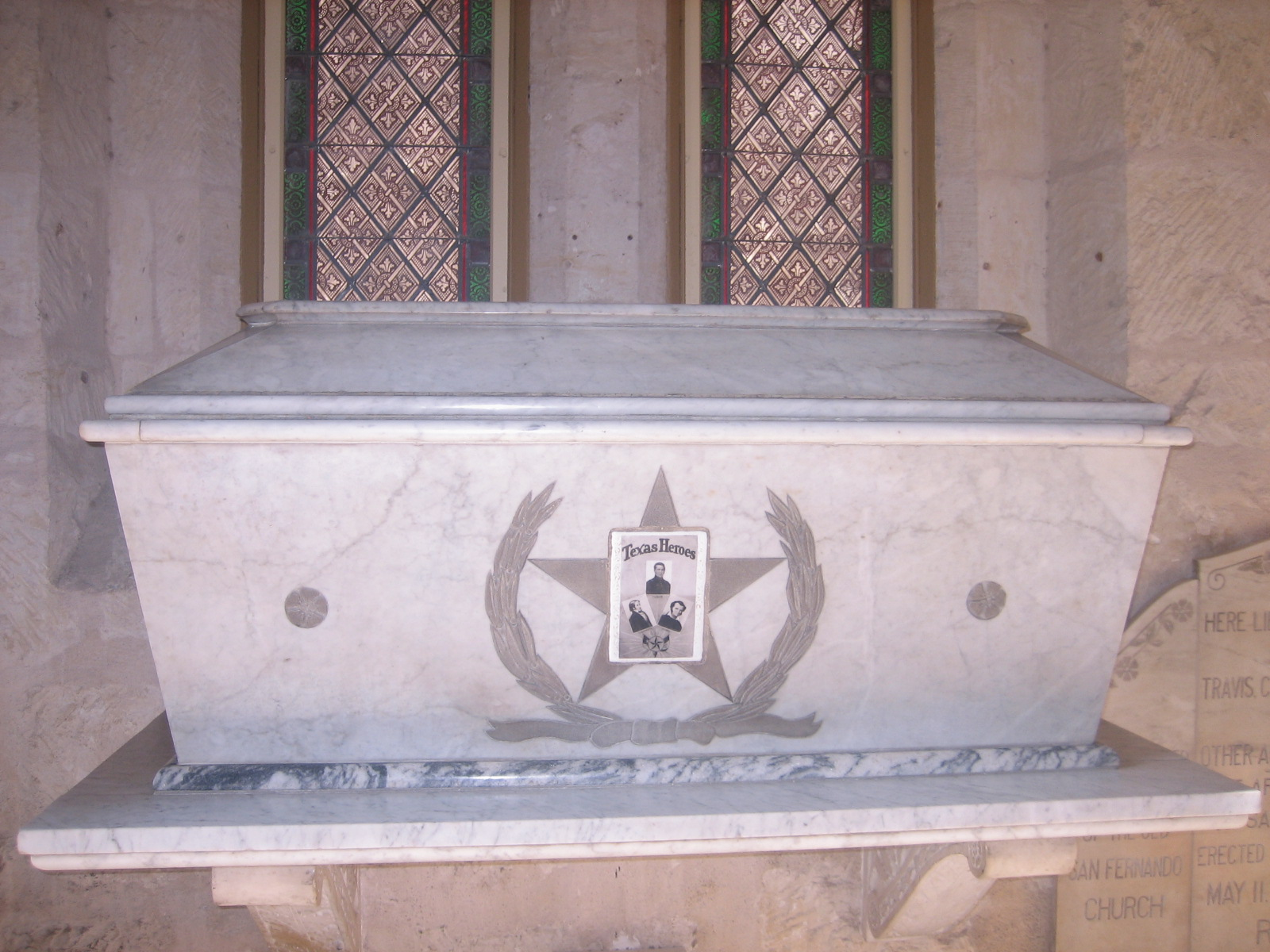
Cathedral of San Fernando sarcophagus with images of Travis, Bowie and Crockett

In response to pleas from Travis, James Fannin started from Goliad with 320 men, supplies and armaments, yet had to abort a day later due to a wagon breakdown. Final reinforcements were able to enter the Alamo during March 1–4, most of them from Gonzales which had become a recruitment camp. (Note: The most notable group from Gonzales in the final days was the Gonzales Mounted Ranger Company, nicknamed the Immortal 32 in later decades, although the exact head count of that company varies by source. Moore (2004), pp. 28–29, 39–43, 46, 51; Moore (2007), p. 100; Lindley (2003), p. 98.) Others who had left intending to return were unable to re-enter. At 5:30 a.m. on March 6, the Mexican army began the final siege. An hour later, all combatants inside the Alamo were dead. The bodies, with the exception of Gregorio Esparza's, were cremated on pyres and abandoned. Esparza's brother Francisco was a soldier in the Mexican army and received permission from Santa Anna for a Christian burial.

Juan Seguín oversaw the 1837 recovery of the abandoned ashes and officiated at the February 25 funeral. The March 28 issue of the Telegraph and Texas Register only gave the burial location as where "the principal heap of ashes" had been found. In the following decades, the public wanted to know the location of the burial site, but Seguín gave conflicting statements, perceived as due to age-related memory problems. Remains thought to be those of the Alamo defenders were discovered at the Cathedral of San Fernando during the Texas 1936 centennial, and re-interred in a marble sarcophagus. Purported to hold the ashes of Travis, Bowie and Crockett, some have doubted it can be proven whose remains are entombed there.

== Identifying the combatants ==
Below are 215 known combatants: 193 who died during the siege, 31 survivors, and one escapee who later died of his wounds.

Mexican Colonel Juan Almonte, Santa Anna's aide-de-camp, recorded the Texian fatality toll as 250 in his March 6 journal entry. He listed the survivors as five women, one Mexican soldier and one slave. Almonte did not record names, and his count was based solely on who was there during the final assault. Santa Anna reported to Mexico's Secretary of War Tornel that Texian fatalities exceeded 600. Historians Jack Jackson and John Wheat attributed that high figure to Santa Anna's playing to his political base.

Research into the battle, and exactly who was inside the fortress, began when the Alamo fell and has continued with no signs of abatement. The first published Texian list of casualties was in the March 24, 1836 issue of the Telegraph and Texas Register. The 115 names were supplied by John W. Smith and Gerald Navan, who historian Thomas Ricks Lindley believed likely drew from their own memories, as well as from interviews with those who might have left or tried to enter. In an 1860 statement for the Texas Almanac, former San Antonio alcalde (mayor) Francisco Antonio Ruiz set the number at 182.

When the Alamo Cenotaph was created by Pompeo Coppini in 1939, the 187 defender names on the monument came from the research of Amelia Williams, considered the leading Alamo authority of her day. Her work is still used by some as a benchmark, although skepticism has been voiced. Lindley's 2003 Alamo Traces: New Evidence and New Conclusions upended much of what was previously accepted as fact. He devoted a chapter to deconstructing Williams' research as "misrepresentation, alteration, and fabrication of data", criticizing the low value she placed on muster rolls as evidence that a man died at the Alamo, and her over-reliance on military land grants, even though the officials who approved the land grants considered the muster rolls to be sufficient proof. Many historians have been slow to embrace Lindley's findings, however. At this writing, most Alamo defender biographies on the Texas State Historical Association's website (tshaonline.org) and the official Alamo site (thealamo.org) draw from the work of historian Bill Groneman, who relied heavily on Williams, and show little, if any, influence from Lindley.

In the pursuit of uncovering every infinitesimal piece of evidence about what happened during the battle, more thorough research methods continue to evolve and Tejanos have begun to add their voices. Until recent decades, accounts of Tejano participation in the Texas revolution were notably absent, but historians such as Timothy M. Matovina and Jesús F. de la Teja have helped add that missing perspective to the battle's events.

== Key to military rank abbreviations ==
Key to military rank abbreviations

COL	Colonel	LT	Lieutenant	SGM	Sergeant-Major	CPL	Corporal
LTC	Lieutenant Colonel	1LT	First Lieutenant	4SG	Fourth Sergeant	PVT	Private
MAJ	Major	2LT	Second Lieutenant	SGT	Sergeant	QM	Quartermaster
CPT	Captain	CNT	Cornet	3CPL	Third Corporal	AQM	Assistant Quartermaster

== Defenders ==
Name	Rank	Birth year	Birthplace	Status	Legacy and notes	Ref(s)
Juan Abamillo	SGT	—	Texas	fatality		
James L. Allen	PVT	1815	Kentucky	survivor	Left on March 5 as the final courier sent from the Alamo	
Robert Allen	PVT	—	Virginia	fatality		
George Andrews	—	—	—	fatality		
Miles DeForest Andross	PVT	1809	Vermont	fatality		
José María Arocha	—	—	—	survivor	Juan Seguin's volunteers	
Simon Arreola	—	—	—	survivor	Juan Seguin's volunteers	
Micajah Autry	PVT	1793	North Carolina	fatality		
Juan A. Badillo	SGT	—	Texas	fatality		
Peter James Bailey III	PVT	1812	Kentucky	fatality	Namesake of Bailey County, Texas	
Isaac G. Baker	PVT	1814	Arkansas	fatality	Gonzales Mounted Ranger Company	
William Charles M. Baker	CPT	—	Missouri	fatality		
John J. Ballentine	PVT	—	Pennsylvania	fatality		
Richard W. Ballentine	PVT	1814	Scotland	fatality		
John J. Baugh	CPT	1803	Virginia	fatality	Adjutant of the garrison, next in command after co-commanders Bowie and Travis	
Samuel G. Bastian	—	—	Louisiana	survivor	Claimed to be a courier, quickly denounced as a fraud, but now accepted by some historians	
Joseph Bayliss	PVT	1808	Tennessee	fatality		
John Walker Baylor Jr.	PVT	1813	Kentucky	survivor	Sent as a courier to Goliad	
John Blair	PVT	1803	Tennessee	fatality		
Samuel Blair	CPT	1807	Tennessee	fatality	Assistant to Master of Ordnance	
William Blazeby	CPT	1795	England	fatality		
James Bonham	2LT	1807	South Carolina	fatality	Courier to Goliad and Gonzales, returned March 3, possibly died manning one of the cannons	
Daniel Bourne	PVT	1810	England	fatality		
James Bowie	COL	c. 1796	Kentucky	fatality	Co-commander of the garrison after the departure of James C. Neill; became bedridden the day after the siege began. Namesake of Bowie County.	
J. B. Bowman	—	—	—	fatality	Possibly AKA James H. Bowman	
Robert Brown	PVT	c. 1818	—	survivor	Left after February 25, later served as a baggage guard at the Battle of San Jacinto	
James Buchanan	PVT	1813	Alabama	fatality		
Samuel E. Burns	PVT	1810	Ireland	fatality		
George D. Butler	PVT	1813	Missouri Territory	fatality		
John Cain	PVT	1802	Pennsylvania	fatality	Gonzales Mounted Ranger Company	
Robert Campbell	LT	1810	Tennessee	fatality		
William R. Carey	CPT	1806	Virginia	fatality		
Cesario Carmona	—	—	—	survivor	Juan Seguin's volunteers	
M.B. Clark	PVT	—	Mississippi	fatality		
Daniel W. Cloud	PVT	1812	Kentucky	fatality		
Robert E. Cochran	PVT	1810	New Hampshire	fatality	Namesake of Cochran County, Texas	
George Washington Cottle	LT	1811	Missouri	fatality	Gonzales Mounted Ranger Company; namesake of Cottle County, Texas	
Henry Courtman	PVT	1808	Germany	fatality		
Lemuel Crawford	PVT	1814	South Carolina	fatality		
David Crockett	COL	1786	Tennessee	fatality	Frontiersman and congressman, his life was portrayed in many exploits during and after his death. Namesake of Crockett County, Texas	
Robert Crossman	PVT	1810	Pennsylvania	fatality		
Antonio Cruz y Arocha	PVT	—	Mexico	survivor	Left as courier with Seguin on February 25	
David P. Cummings	PVT	1809	Pennsylvania	fatality	Gonzales Mounted Ranger Company	
Robert Cunningham	PVT	1804	New York	fatality		
Matias Curvier	—	—	—	survivor	Juan Seguin's volunteers	
Jacob C. Darst	LT	1793	Kentucky	fatality	Gonzales Mounted Ranger Company	
John Davis	PVT	1811	Kentucky	fatality	Gonzales Mounted Ranger Company	
Freeman H.K. Day	PVT	1806	—	fatality		
Squire Daymon	PVT	1808	Tennessee	fatality	Gonzales Mounted Ranger Company	
William Dearduff	PVT	c. 1811	Tennessee	fatality	Gonzales Mounted Ranger Company	
Alexandro De la Garza	PVT	—	Texas	survivor	Dispatched as a courier	
Stephen Dennison	PVT	1812	England or Ireland	fatality		
John Desauque	—	—	Louisiana	fatality	Slave of Francis Desauque, served as a combatant. (Slaves identified by last names of their masters.)	
Charles Despallier	PVT	1812	Louisiana	fatality	Gonzales Mounted Ranger Company	
Lewis Dewall	PVT	1812	New York	fatality		
Almaron Dickinson	CPT	1810	Tennessee	fatality		
John Henry Dillard	PVT	1805	Tennessee	fatality		
James R. Dimpkins	SGT	—	England	fatality	AKA Dicken, Dickon, Dickson, Dockon, Dimkin, Dinkin, Dinkins	
Andrew Duvalt	PVT	1804	Ireland	fatality	Gonzales Mounted Ranger Company	
Samuel M. Edwards	—	—	—	fatality		
Conrad Eigenauer	—	—	—	fatality		
Lucio Enriques	—	—	—	survivor	Juan Seguin's volunteers	
Carlos Espalier	PVT	1819	Texas	fatality		
José Gregorio Esparza	PVT	1802	Texas	fatality		
Robert Evans	MAJ	1800	Ireland	fatality	Master of Ordnance	
Samuel B. Evans	PVT	1812	New York	fatality		
James L. Ewing	PVT	1812	Tennessee	fatality		
William Keener Fauntleroy	PVT	1814	Kentucky	fatality		
William Fishbaugh	PVT	—	Alabama	fatality	Gonzales Mounted Ranger Company	
John Flanders	PVT	1800	Salisbury, Massachusetts	fatality	Gonzales Mounted Ranger Company	
Manuel N. Flores	—	c.1801	Texas	survivor	Juan Seguin's volunteers	
Salvador Flores	CPT	1806	Texas	survivor	Left with Seguín on February 25	
Dolphin Ward Floyd	PVT	1804	North Carolina	fatality	Namesake of Floyd County, Texas; Gonzales Mounted Ranger Company	
John Hubbard Forsyth	CPT	1797	New York	fatality		
Antonio Fuentes	PVT	1813	Texas	fatality		
Galba Fuqua	PVT	1819	Alabama	fatality	Gonzales Mounted Ranger Company	
William Garnett	PVT	1812	Virginia	fatality		
James W. Garrand	PVT	1813	Louisiana	fatality		
James Girard Garrett	PVT	1806	Tennessee	fatality		
John E. Garvin	PVT	1809	—	fatality	Gonzales Mounted Ranger Company	
John E. Gaston	PVT	1819	—	fatality	Gonzales Mounted Ranger Company	
James George	PVT	1802	—	fatality	Gonzales Mounted Ranger Company	
John C. Goodrich	CNT	1809	Virginia	fatality		
Albert Calvin Grimes	PVT	1817	Georgia	fatality		
Ignacio Gurrea	—	—	—	survivor	Juan Seguin's volunteers	
Brigido Guerrero	PVT	—	Mexico	survivor	A deserter from Ugartechea's troops, convinced the Mexican troops he was a prisoner of war	
James C. Gwin	PVT	1804	England	fatality	AKA Gwynne	
John Harris	PVT	1813	Kentucky	fatality		
Andrew Jackson Harrison	PVT	1809	Tennessee	fatality		
I.L.K. Harrison	—	—	—	fatality		
William B. Harrison	CPT	1811	Ohio	fatality		
Joseph M. Hawkins	PVT	1799	Ireland	fatality		
John M. Hays	PVT	1814	Tennessee	fatality		
Charles M. Heiskell	PVT	1813	Tennessee	fatality		
Patrick Henry Herndon	PVT	1802	Virginia	fatality		
Pedro Herrera	—	—	—	survivor	Juan Seguin's volunteers	
William Daniel Hersee	SGT	1805	England	fatality		
Tapley Holland	PVT	1810	Ohio	fatality	First to cross over the line in the sand.	
James Holloway	—	—	—	fatality		
Samuel Holloway	PVT	1808	Pennsylvania	fatality		
William D. Howell	—	1791	Massachusetts	fatality		
Thomas P. Hutchinson	—	—	—	fatality		
Thomas R. Jackson	PVT	—	Ireland	fatality	Gonzales Mounted Ranger Company	
William Daniel Jackson	LT	1807	Kentucky	fatality		
Green B. Jameson	MAJ	1807	Kentucky	fatality		
Gordon C. Jennings	CPL	1780	Connecticut	fatality	Oldest defender of The Alamo	
Damacio Jiménez	PVT	1812	Texas	fatality	Juan Seguin's volunteers	
John Johnson	PVT	1800	Missouri	survivor	Dispatched as courier February 23	
Lewis Johnson	PVT	—	Illinois Territory	fatality		
William Johnson	PVT	—	Pennsylvania	fatality		
John Jones	1LT	1810	New York	fatality		
John Benjamin Kellogg	LT	1817	Kentucky	fatality	Gonzales Mounted Ranger Company	
James Kenny	PVT	1814	Virginia	fatality		
Andrew Kent	PVT	1791	Kentucky	fatality	Namesake of Kent County, Texas, Gonzales Mounted Ranger Company	
Joseph Kerr	PVT	1814	Louisiana	fatality		
George C. Kimble	LT	1803	Pennsylvania	fatality	Namesake of Kimble County, Texas; Gonzales Mounted Ranger Company	
William Philip King	PVT	1820	Mississippi	fatality	Youngest defender fatality; namesake of King County; Gonzales Mounted Ranger Company	
William Irvine Lewis	PVT	1806	Virginia	fatality		
William J. Lightfoot	3CPL	1805	Kentucky	fatality		
Jonathan Lindley	PVT	1814	Illinois	fatality	Gonzales Mounted Ranger Company	
William Linn	PVT	—	Massachusetts	fatality		
Byrd Lockhart	CPT	1782	Virginia	survivor	Left with Andrew Jackson Sowell to buy supplies; namesake of Lockhart, Texas	
Toribio Losoya	PVT	1808	Texas	fatality		
George Washington Main	LT	1807	Virginia	fatality		
William T. Malone	PVT	1817	Georgia	fatality		
William Marshall	PVT	1808	Tennessee	fatality		
Albert Martin	CPT	1808	Rhode Island	fatality	Gonzales Mounted Ranger Company dispatched with the Travis letter To the People of Texas & All Americans in the World; returned to the Alamo	
Samuel Augustus Maverick	PVT	1803	South Carolina	survivor	Garrison delegate to the March 1 Convention of 1836 at Washington-on-the-Brazos	
Edward McCafferty	LT	—	—	fatality		
Ross McClelland	—	—	—	fatality		
Jesse McCoy	PVT	1804	Tennessee	fatality	Gonzales Mounted Ranger Company	
William McDowell	PVT	1794	Pennsylvania	fatality		
James McGee	PVT	—	Ireland	fatality		
John McGregor	SGT	—	Scotland	fatality		
Robert McKinney	PVT	1809	Ireland	fatality		
Eliel Melton	QM, LT	1798	Georgia	fatality		
Thomas R. Miller	PVT	1795	Tennessee	fatality	Gonzales Mounted Ranger Company	
William Mills	PVT	1815	Tennessee	fatality		
Isaac Millsaps	PVT	c. 1795	Mississippi	fatality	Gonzales Mounted Ranger Company	
Edward F. Mitchasson	—	1806	Virginia	fatality	AKA Dr. E. F. Mitchusson	
Edwin T. Mitchell	PVT	1806	—	fatality		
Napoleon B. Mitchell	PVT	1804	—	fatality		
Robert B. Moore	PVT	1781	Virginia	fatality		
Willis A. Moore	PVT	1808	Marion County MS	fatality		
John Morman	—	—	—	fatality		
Robert Musselman	SGT	1805	Ohio	fatality		
Andrés Nava	SGT	1810	Texas	fatality		
George Neggan	PVT	1808	South Carolina	fatality	Gonzales Mounted Ranger Company	
Andrew M. Nelson	PVT	1809	Tennessee	fatality		
Edward Nelson	PVT	1816	South Carolina	fatality		
George Nelson	PVT	1805	South Carolina	fatality		
James Northcross	PVT	1804	Virginia	fatality		
James Nowlan	PVT	1809	England	fatality		
George Olamio	PVT	—	Ireland	fatality		
William Sanders Oury	PVT	1817	Virginia	survivor	Dispatched as a courier February 29	
George Pagan	PVT	1810	—	fatality		
Christopher Adams Parker	PVT	1814	—	fatality		
William Parks	PVT	1805	North Carolina	fatality		
William Patton	AQM, LT	1808	Kentucky	survivor	Assumed to be a courier, who left with John William Smith	
Richardson Perry	PVT	1817	Mississippi	fatality		
Amos Pollard	—	1803	Massachusetts	fatality	Chief surgeon of the garrison, created a hospital in the fortress	
Eduardo Ramirez	—	—	—	survivor	Juan Seguin's volunteers	
John Purdy Reynolds	PVT	1806	Pennsylvania	fatality		
Thomas H. Roberts	PVT	—	—	fatality		
James Waters Robertson	PVT	1812	Tennessee	fatality		
Ambrosio Rodriguez	—	—	—	survivor	Juan Seguin's volunteers	
Guadalupe Rodriquez	—	—	—	fatality		
James M. Rose	PVT	1805	Ohio	fatality		
(Louis?) Rose	PVT		Nacogdoches	fatality or left before the battle	Historians are divided over whether a purported Alamo survivor named Louis "Moses" Rose is the same man who appears on most early Alamo casualty lists.	
Jacob Roth	MAJ	—	—	fatality		
Jackson J. Rusk	PVT	—	Ireland	fatality		
Joseph Rutherford	PVT	1798	Kentucky	fatality		
Isaac Ryan	PVT	1805	Louisiana	fatality		
Mial Scurlock	PVT	1809	North Carolina	fatality		
Juan Seguín	CPT	1806	Texas	survivor	Left February 25 to recruit reinforcements	
Marcus L. Sewell	PVT	1805	England	fatality	Gonzales Mounted Ranger Company	(Note: Some lore gives the birthplace of Sewell as Tennessee but has no definitive source; however, scholars and other sourcing, including the Alamo, say he was born in England. Todish (1998), p. 85; Moore (2007), p. 100.; "Marcus L.Sewell". Alamo Mission in San Antonio. Archived from the original on March 28, 2016. "Who Was Marcus Sewell?". Sons of DeWitt Colony Texas. TAMU. Archived from the original on November 1, 2015. Groneman, Bill (June 15, 2010). "Marcus Sewell". Handbook of Texas Online. Texas State Historical Association. Archived from the original on April 18, 2016.)
Manson Shied	PVT	1811	Georgia	fatality	aka Shudd	
Silvero	—	—	—	survivor	Juan Seguin's volunteers	
Cleveland Kinloch Simmons	LT	1815	South Carolina	fatality		
Andrew H. Smith	PVT	1815	Tennessee	fatality		
Charles S. Smith	PVT	1806	Maryland	fatality		
John William Smith	—	1792	Virginia	survivor	The final courier sent to Washington-on-the-Brazos, unable to return	
Joshua G. Smith	SGT	1808	North Carolina	fatality		
William H. Smith	PVT	1811	—	fatality		
Launcelot Smither	PVT	1800	—	survivor	Left for Gonzales as a courier on February 23; relayed the Travis letter from Albert Martin to the provisional government at San Felipe	
Andrew Jackson Sowell	PVT	1815	Tennessee	survivor	Left with Byrd Lockhart to buy supplies	
John Spratt	PVT	—	—	fatality		
Richard Starr	PVT	1811	England	fatality		
James E. Stewart	PVT	1808	England	fatality		
Richard L. Stockton	PVT	1817	New Jersey	fatality		
A. Spain Summerlin	PVT	1817	Tennessee	fatality		
William E. Summers	PVT	1812	South Carolina	fatality	Gonzales Mounted Ranger Company	
John Sutherland	PVT	1792	Virginia	survivor	Sent to Gonzales for reinforcements on February 23	
William DePriest Sutherland	PVT	1818	Alabama	fatality		
Edward Taylor	PVT	1812	Tennessee	fatality	Namesake of Taylor County, Texas, brother of James and George	
George Taylor	PVT	1816	Tennessee	fatality	Namesake of Taylor County, brother of Edward and James	
James Taylor	PVT	1814	Tennessee	fatality	Namesake of Taylor County, Texas, brother of George and Edward	
William Taylor	PVT	1799	Tennessee	fatality		
B. Archer M. Thomas	PVT	1818	Kentucky	fatality		
Henry Thomas	PVT	1811	Germany	fatality		
Thompson	—	—	—	fatality	Per historian Lindley, no first name on the muster rolls	
John W. Thomson	PVT	1807	North Carolina	fatality		
John, M. Thurston	2LT	1812	Pennsylvania	fatality		
Burke Trammel	PVT	1810	Ireland	fatality		
Joe Travis	—	1813 or 1815	Alabama	survivor	Slave of William B. Travis, fought beside him in the battle; accompanied Susanna Dickinson to Gonzales. (Slaves identified by last names of their masters.)	
William B. Travis	LTC	1809	South Carolina	fatality	Shared command of the garrison with James Bowie until the latter became bedridden and unable to command. Namesake of Travis County.	
George W. Tumlinson	PVT	1814	Missouri Territory	fatality	Gonzales Mounted Ranger Company	
James Tylee	PVT	1795	New York	fatality		
Asa Walker	PVT	1813	Tennessee	fatality		
Jacob Walker	PVT	1799	Tennessee	fatality		
William B. Ward	SGT	1806	Ireland	fatality		
Henry Warnell	PVT	1812	Arkansas	escaped	Died June 1836 of wounds incurred during the battle or during his escape	
Joseph G. Washington	PVT	c. 1808	Tennessee	fatality	Possibly AKA James Morgan	
Thomas Waters	PVT	1812	England	fatality		
William Wells	PVT	1798	Georgia	fatality		
Isaac White	SGT	—	—	fatality		
Robert White	CPT	1806	England	fatality	Gonzales Mounted Ranger Company	
Hiram James Williamson	SGM	1810	Pennsylvania	fatality		
William Wills	—	—	—	fatality		
David L. Wilson	PVT	1807	Scotland	fatality		
John Wilson	PVT	1804	Pennsylvania	fatality		
Anthony Wolf	PVT	1782	—	fatality		
Claiborne Wright	PVT	1810	North Carolina	fatality	Gonzales Mounted Ranger Company	
Charles Zanco	LT	1808	Denmark	fatality		
Vicente Zepeda	—	—	—	survivor	Juan Seguin's volunteers	

== See also ==
- List of Texian survivors of the Battle of the Alamo
- Bibliography of the Texas Revolution, Republic, and Annexation

== Citations ==
=== References ===
- Brown, John Henry (November 12, 1988). Indian Wars and Pioneers of Texas. Germany: Jazzybee Verlag Jurgen Beck. ISBN 978-3-84967-445-8.
- Carrington, Evelyn M. (1993). Women in Early Texas. Denton, TX: Texas State Historical Association. OCLC 651721302. Archived from the original on June 12, 2015.
- Chariton, Wallace O. (1990). Exploring the Alamo Legends. Dallas, TX: Republic of Texas Press. ISBN 978-1-55622-255-9.
- Davis, William C (2004). Lone Star Rising: The Revolutionary Birth of the Texas Republic. New York, NY: Free Press. ISBN 978-0-684-86510-2.
- de la Teja, Jesús (1991). A Revolution Remembered: The Memoirs and Selected Correspondence of Juan N. Seguin. Austin, Texas: State House Press. ISBN 0-938349-68-6.
- Edmondson, J. R. (2000). The Alamo Story: From History to Current Conflicts. Plano, Texas: Republic of Texas Press. ISBN 1-55622-678-0.
- Groneman, Bill (1990). Alamo Defenders: A Genealogy, the People and Their Words. Austin, Texas: Eakin Press. ISBN 978-0-89015-757-2.
- Groneman, Bill (2001). Eyewitness to the Alamo. Lanham, MD: Republic of Texas Press. ISBN 978-1-55622-846-9.
- Hatch, Thom (1999). Encyclopedia of the Alamo and the Texas Revolution. Jefferson, North Carolina: McFarland & Company. ISBN 978-0-7864-0593-0.
- Hopewell, Clifford (1994). James Bowie Texas Fighting Man: A Biography. Austin, Texas: Eakin Press. ISBN 0-89015-881-9.
- Jackson, Jack; Wheat, John (2005). Almonte's Texas: Juan N. Almonte's 1834 Inspection, Secret Report & Role in the 1836 Campaign. Denton, Texas: Texas State Historical Association. ISBN 978-0-87611-207-6.
- Lindley, Thomas Ricks (2003). Alamo Traces: New Evidence and New Conclusions. Plano, Texas: Republic of Texas Press. ISBN 1-55622-983-6.
- Lord, Walter (1961). A Time to Stand. Lincoln, Nebraska: University of Nebraska Press. Reprint: ISBN 0-8032-7902-7.
- Matovina, Timothy M. (1995). The Alamo Remembered: Tejano Accounts and Perspectives. Austin, Texas: University of Texas Press. ISBN 978-0-292-75186-6.
- Moore, Stephen L. (2004). Eighteen Minutes: The Battle of San Jacinto and the Texas Independence Campaign. Dallas, Texas: Republic of Texas Press. ISBN 978-1-58907-009-7.
- Moore, Stephen L. (2007). Savage Frontier: Rangers, Riflemen, and Indian Wars in Texas. Vol. I: 1835–1837. Denton, Texas: University of North Texas Press. ISBN 978-1-57441-235-2.
- Myers, John Myers (1948). The Alamo. Lincoln, Nebraska: University of Nebraska Press. Reprint: ISBN 0-8032-5779-1.
- Nofi, Albert A. (1992). The Alamo and the Texas War of Independence, September 30, 1835 to April 21, 1836: Heroes, Myths, and History. Conshohocken, Pennsylvania: Combined Books. ISBN 0-938289-10-1.
- Poyo, Gerald Eugene (1996). Tejano Journey, 1770–1850. Austin, Texas: University of Texas Press. ISBN 978-0-292-76570-2.
- Todish, Timothy J.; Todish, Terry; Spring, Ted (1998). Alamo Sourcebook, 1836: A Comprehensive Guide to the Battle of the Alamo and the Texas Revolution. Austin, Texas: Eakin Press. ISBN 978-1-57168-152-2.
