= Immortal 32 =

Alamo siege relief force

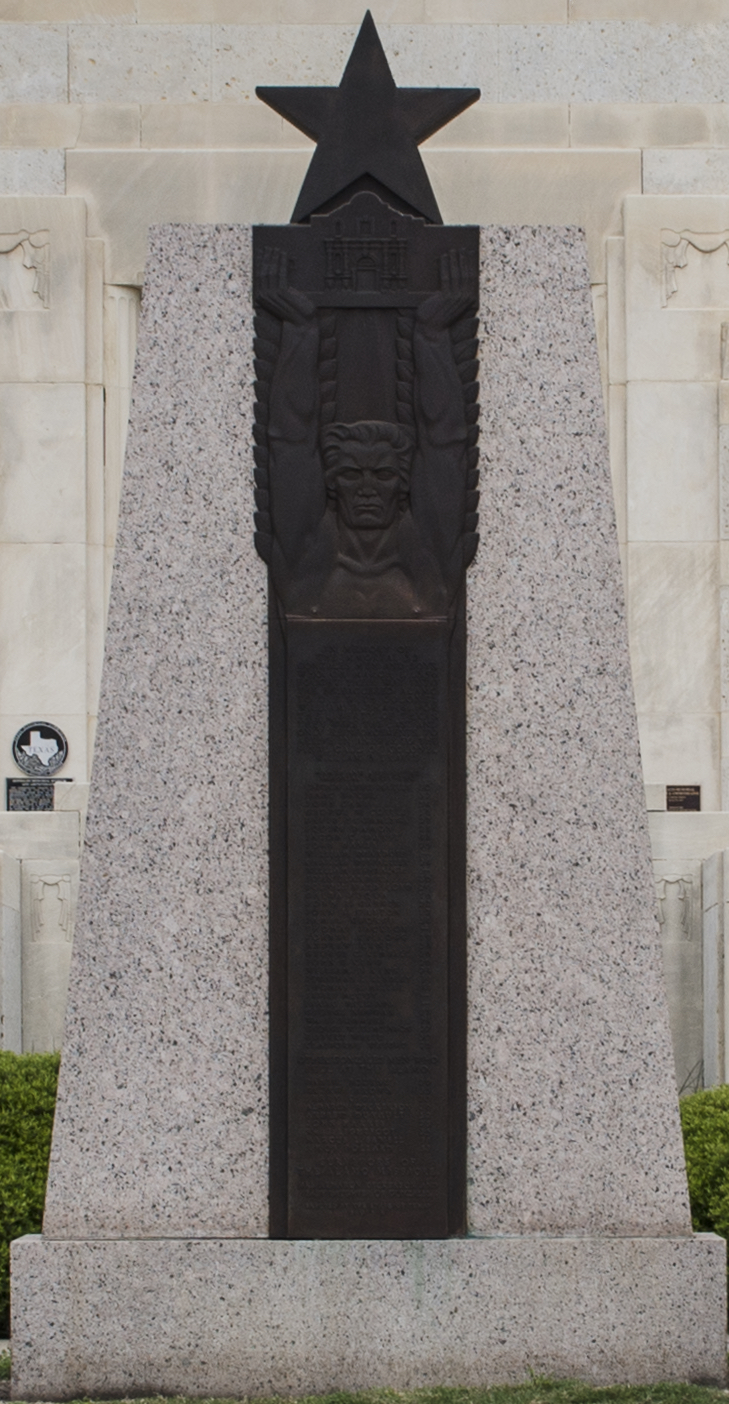
Immortal 32 Centennial Monument by Raoul Josset, 1936. Gonzales Memorial Museum, Gonzales, Texas.

The Immortal 32 was a relief force of thirty-two Texian Militia from the Gonzales Ranger Company who reinforced the Texians under siege at the Alamo. They are "immortalized" as the only unit to answer the To the People of Texas & All Americans in the World letter. Along with the other Alamo defenders, they were all killed and burned after the Battle of the Alamo.

== Background ==
As Santa Anna's army approached the Alamo February 19, 1836, William Travis dispatched John Johnson to Goliad for reinforcement from James Fannin. He also dispatched John Smith and Dr. James Sutherland to Gonzales with a letter for the Alcade Andrew Ponton:

"The enemy in large force is in sight. We want men and provisions. Send them to us. We have 150 men and are determined to defend the Alamo to the last. Give us assistance."

William Barrett Travis

Lt. Col. Comdt.

That night, Santa Anna sent General Ventura Mora's cavalry to encircle to the North and East corners of the Alamo to prevent the arrival of reinforcements.

On February 24, Travis dispatched Albert Martin to Gonzales with a second letter for Andrew Ponton:

Commandancy of the Alamo, Bexar, Feby. 24th, 1836. To the People of Texas and All Americans in the World—

Fellow Citizens and Compatriots: I am besieged by a thousand or more of the Mexicans under Santa Anna. I have sustained a continual Bombardment and cannonade for 24 hours and have not lost a man. The enemy has demanded a surrender at discretion, otherwise, the garrison are to be put to the sword, if the fort is taken. I have answered the demand with a cannon shot, and our flag still waves proudly from the walls. I shall never surrender or retreat. Then, I call on you in the name of Liberty, of Patriotism and everything dear to the American character, to come to our aid with all dispatch. The enemy is receiving reinforcements daily and will no doubt increase to three or four thousand in four or five days. If this call is neglected, I am determined to sustain myself as long as possible and die like a soldier who never forgets what is due to his own honor and that of his country. Victory or death.

William Barrett Travis,

Lt. Col. Comdt.

P. S. The Lord is on our side. When the enemy appeared in sight we had not three bushels of corn. We have since found in deserted houses 80 to 100 bushels and got into the walls 20 or 30 head of Beeves.

Ponton received the first letter on February 24. He mobilized George Kimble, commander of the Texian Militia Gonzales Ranger Company, who mustered his unit and waited for Fannin; who also received the first letter on February 24. On February 26, Fannin departed Goliad for the Alamo with 320 men, 4 cannon, and several supply wagons. After repeated disasters, Fannin abandoned the mission and returned to Goliad. On February 27, Kimble departed with his unit for the Alamo.

Ponton received the second letter on February 27 and dispatched it to Governor Henry Smith in San Felipe. Smith informed colonists:

Fellow Citizens and Countrymen: The foregoing official communication from Colonel Travis, now in command at Bexar, needs no comment. The garrison, composed of only 150 Americans, engaged in a deadly conflict with 1,000 of the mercenary troops of the Dictator, who are daily receiving reinforcements, should be a sufficient call upon you without saying more. However secure, however fortunate, our garrison may be, they have not the provisions nor the ammunition to stand more than a thirty days' siege at farthest. I call upon you as an officer, I implore you as a man, to fly to the aid of your besieged countrymen and not permit them to be massacred by a mercenary foe. I slight none! The call is upon ALL who are able to bear arms, to rally without one moment's delay, or in fifteen days the heart of Texas will be the seat of war. This is not imaginary. The enemy from 6,000 to 8,000 strong are on our border and rapidly moving by forced marches for the colonies. The campaign has commenced. We must promptly meet the enemy or all will be lost. Do you possess honor? Suffer it not to be insulted or tarnished! Do you possess patriotism? Evince it by your bold, prompt and manly action! If you posses even humanity you will rally without a moment's delay to the aid of your besieged countrymen!

Governor Henry Smith

Travis dispatched his final letter to the President David G. Burnet on March 3:

Commandancy of the Alamo Bejar, March 3d 1836.

Sir : In the present confusion of the political authorities of the country, and in the absence of the commander-in-chief, I beg leave to communicate to you the situation of this garrison. You have doubtless already seen my official report of the action of the twenty-fifth ult. made on that day to Gen. Sam. Houston, together with the various communications heretofore sent by express, I shall therefore confine myself to what has transpired since that date.

From the twenty-fifth to the present date the enemy have kept up a bombardment from two howitzers, — one a five and a half inch, and the other an eight inch, — and a heavy cannonade from two long nine-pounders, mounted on a battery on the opposite side of the river at a distance of four hundred yards from our wall. During this period the enemy have been busily employed in encircling us in with entrenched encampments on all sides, at the following distance, to wit : In Bejar, four hundred yards west; in Lavilleta, three hundred yards south; at the powder house, one thousand yards east of south; on the ditch, eight hundred yards northeast, and at the old mill, eight hundred yards north. Notwithstanding all this, a company of thirty-two men from Gonzales, made their way in to us on the morning of the first inst. at three o'clock, and Col. J. B. Bonham (a courier from Gonzales) got in this morning at eleven o'clock, without molestation. I have fortified this place, so that the walls are generally proof against cannon balls; and I still continue to entrench on the inside, and strengthen walls by throwing up the dirt. At least two hundred shells have fallen inside of our works without having injured a single man; indeed we have been so fortunate as not to lose a man from any cause, and we have killed many of the enemy. The spirits of my men are still high, although they have had much to depress them. We have contended for ten days against an enemy whose numbers are variously estimated at from fifteen hundred to six thousand men, with General Ramirez Sesma and Colonel Batres, the aid-de-camp, of Santa Anna, at their head. A report was circulated that Santa Anna himself was with the enemy, but I think it was false. A reinforcement of about one thousand men is now entering Bejar, from the west, and I think it more than probable that Santa Anna is now in town, from the rejoicing we hear.

Colonel Fannin is said to be on the march to this place with reinforcements, but I fear it is not true, as I have repeatedly sent to him for aid without receiving any. Colonel Bonham, my special messenger, arrived at La Bahia fourteen days ago, with a request for aid; and on arrival of the enemy in Bejar, ten days ago, I sent an express to Colonel F., which arrived at Goliad on the next day, urging him to send us reinforcements; none have yet arrived. I look to the colonies alone for aid; unless it arrives soon, I shall have to fight the enemy on his own terms. I will, however, do the best I can under the circumstances; and I feel confident that the determined valor and desperate courage, heretofore exhibited by my men, will not fail them in the last struggle; and although they may be sacrificed to the vengeance of a Gothic enemy, the victory will cost the enemy so dear, that it will be worse for him than a defeat. I hope your honorable body will hasten on reinforcements, ammunition, and provisions to our aid as soon as possible. We have provisions for twenty days for the men we have. Our supply of ammunition is limited. At least five hundred pounds of cannon powder, and two hundred rounds of six, nine, twelve and eighteen pound balls, ten kegs of rifle powder and a supply of lead, should be sent to the place without delay, under a sufficient guard.

If these things are promptly sent, and large reinforcements are hastened to this frontier, this neighborhood will be the great and decisive ground. The power of Santa Anna is to be met here, or in the colonies; we had better meet them here than to suffer a war of devastation to rage in our settlements. A blood red banner waves from the church of Bejar, and in the camp above us, in token that the war is one of vengeance against rebels; they have declared us as such; demanded that we should surrender at discretion, or that this garrison should be put to the sword. Their threats have had no influence on me or my men, but to make all fight with desperation, and that high souled courage which characterizes the patriot, who is willing to die in defence of his country's liberty and his own honor.

The citizens of this municipality are all our enemies, except those who have joined us heretofore. We have but three Mexican now in the fort : those who have not joined us, in this extremity, should be declared public enemies, and their property should aid in paying the expenses of the war.

The bearer of this will give your honorable body a statement more in detail, should he escape through the enemy's lines.

God and Texas — Victory or Death.

Your obedient servant,

W. Barrett Travis,

Lieut. Col. Comm.

== History ==
On February 29, 1836, the "Immortal 32" led by George Kimbell arrived at the Alamo. At 3:00 am on March 1, under the cover of night, they slipped through Santa Anna's lines and entered the fort. They are the only relief force to arrive before the final assault. On March 5, James Allen is the last Texian to leave the Alamo with a final dispatch from William Travis and various letters from the Alamo Defenders. A letter written by one of the thirty-two, Isaac Millsaps, details events inside the Alamo on the night before the final assault; its authenticity is disputed:

Morale is low tonight and many of the men have finished their joy at us, the "Immortal 32". Many rejoiced, though at the suggestion of one Colonel William Travis that sleep was commendable. Indeed we are all tired, as the day has been long for the defenders, and for us, the 32, the fatigue of sneaking past Mexican guard was indeed high. We hope to commence a new attack fresh in the morning tomorrow. At the sight of us, many of the Texan Alamo defenders gave joy, and many sleep in peace tonight with the hope of new recruits coming tomorrow. WE, the thirty-two are much hesitant to tell them of the fact of the Texan government being dispersed due to much talking and argument; Travis' letters of plea have met no audience, and none know of our plight. it is no wonder that us 32 are indeed low and unable to sleep as we now rethink our plan of joining the Alamo defenders we shall meet sure death.

completely yours,

Isaac

On March 6, the final assault of the siege, the Battle of the Alamo, commenced at 5:00 am. By 6:30 am, 257 of the 260 defenders, including all of the "Immortal 32", had been killed. Their bodies were stacked and burned.

== The 32 ==
Sources

1. George C. Kimble, 33, commander
2. Albert Martin, 28 (also Old Eighteen)
3. Isaac G. Baker, 21
4. John Cain, 34
5. George W. Cottle, 25 (brother of an Old Eighteen)
6. David P. Cummins, 27
7. Jacob C. Darst, 42 (also Old Eighteen)
8. John Davis, 25
9. Squire Daymon, 28
10. William Dearduff, 19
11. Charles Despallier/ Espalier, 24
12. Almaron Dickinson (also Old Eighteen)
13. William Fishbaugh
14. John Flanders, 36
15. Dolphin Ward Floyd, 32
16. Galva Fuqua, 16
17. John E. Garvin, about 40
18. John E. Gaston, 17
19. James George, 34
20. Thomas Jackson (also Old Eighteen)
21. John Benjamin Kellogg II, 19
22. Andrew Kent, 44
23. William Philip King, 16
24. Jonathan L. Lindley, 22
25. Jesse McCoy, 32
26. Thomas R. Miller, 40 (also Old Eighteen)
27. Isaac Millsaps, 41
28. George Neggan, 28
29. William E. Summers, 24
30. George W. Tumlinson, 22
31. Robert White, 30
32. Claiborne Wright, 26

Other individual Texians who answered Travis' letter and died at the Alamo: Daniel Bourne, 26; George Brown, 35; Jerry C. Day, 20; Andrew Duvalt, 32; John Harris, 23; William J. Lightfoot, 25; Marcus L. Sewell, 31; Amos Pollard, 33

== Etymology ==
The origin of Immortal 32 is disputed. It was likely coined and came into popular use after the release of The Immortal Alamo in 1911.

== Legacy ==
=== Centennial Monument ===
Gonzales Memorial Museum in Gonzales, Texas. The Immortal 32 Centennial Monument seen in front.

The Gonzales Memorial Museum was dedicated in 1936 for the Texas Centennial. Among its exhibits is The Immortal 32 Centennial Monument, a tall tapered shaft of pink Texas granite with a bronze sculpture by Raoul Josset. The sculpture depicts an allegorical figure supporting the Alamo above his head. Two flagpoles flank the sculpture. It is located at the end of the 104' reflection pool.

==== National Register ====
The monument was added the National Register of Historic Places (#03001414) on January 13, 2004.

=== Legislation ===
- On March 6, 2018, a commemoration of Immortal Albert Martin was established by Representatives John J. Lombardi, Raymond A. Hull, Antonio Giarrusso, Marvin L. Abney, and Arthur J. Corvese in House Resolution #7942 and authorized by the Rhode Island House of Representatives.

=== Markers ===
- The Immortal 32 Centennial Monument received a Historical Marker (#2624) by the Texas Historical Commission in 1936:

In Memory of the Immortal 32 Gonzales men and boys who, on March 1, 1836 fought their way into the beleaguered Alamo to die with Colonel William B. Travis for the Liberty of Texas. They were the last and only reinforcements to arrive in answer to the final call of Colonel William B. Travis. Names and ages of the Immortal Thirty-Two: Captain Albert Martin, 30; Isaac G. Baker, 32; John Cane, 34; George W. Cottle, 38; David P. Cummings, 27; Squire Damon, 28; Jacob C. Darst, 48; John Davis, 25; William Dearduff; Charles Despallier, 24; William Fishbaugh; John Flanders, 36; Dolphin Ward Floyd, 32; Galva Fuqua, 16; John E. Garvin, 27; John E. Gaston. 17; James George, 34; Thomas Jackson; Jonathan L. Lindley, 31; Jessie McCoy; Isaac Millsaps; George Neggan, 28; Wm. E. Summers, 24; George W. Tumlinson, 22; Robert White, 30; Claiborne Wright, 26. Other Gonzales men who fell at the Alamo. Daniel Bourne, 26; George Brown, 35; Jerry C. Day, 20; Almaron Dickerson, 26; Andrew Duvalt, 32; John Harris, 23; Wm. J. Lightfoot, 25; Marcus L. Sewell, 31; Amos Pollard, 33. Survivors of the Alamo Massacre, Mrs. Almaron Dickerson and baby daughter, of Gonzales.

- Immortal William E. Summers received a Historical Marker (#17286) by the Texas Historical Commission in 2012:

WILLIAM E. SUMMERS (March 29, 1811 – March 6, 1836) WILLIAM E. SUMMERS IS INEXTRICABLY TIED TO TEXAS HISTORY THROUGH HIS INVOLVEMENT WITH THE ELECTION TO NAME DELEGATES TO THE TEXAS INDEPENDENCE CONVENTION AND IN THE FALL OF THE ALAMO AS ONE OF THE IMMORTAL 32. SUMMERS FAMILY HISTORY CAN BE TRACED TO 17TH CENTURY MARYLAND AND SUBSEQUENT MIGRATIONS INTO OTHER STATES. WILLIAM E. SUMMERS WAS BORN IN EDGEFIELD COUNTY, SOUTH CAROLINA TO JESSE SUMMERS (c.1777-1837) AND SARAH "SALLY" COATE(S) SUMMERS (c.1779-1841). AROUND 1820, THE FAMILY MOVED TO CLARKE COUNTY, ALABAMA. IT IS BELIEVED THAT WILLIAM CAME TO TEXAS AROUND 1832. ON FEBRUARY 12, 1835, WILLIAM SUMMERS PETITIONED THE MEXICAN GOVERNMENT FOR A LAND GRANT AND, ON MAY 1, 1835, HE RECEIVED TITLE TO A QUARTER LEAGUE SITUATED ON THE LAVACA RIVER IN THE DEWITT COLONY. SIMILARLY, HENRY C.G. SUMMERS (1804-1853), WILLIAM'S BROTHER, WAS GRANTED A FULL LEAGUE OF LAND THE SAME DAY. BOTH MEN PARTICIPATED IN THE REVOLUTION FOR TEXAS INDEPENDENCE. WILLIAM AND HENRY VOTED IN THE ELECTION HELD ON FEBRUARY 1, 1836 TO NAME DELEGATES TO THE TEXAS INDEPENDENCE CONVENTION THAT BEGAN ON MARCH 1, 1836 AT WASHINGTON-ON-THE-BRAZOS. WILLIAM MUSTERED INTO SERVICE AS A TEXAS RANGER IN THE GONZALES RANGER COMPANY OF MOUNTED VOLUNTEERS ON FEBRUARY 23, 1836. THE VOLUNTEERS DEPARTED GONZALES ON FEBRUARY 25, 1836 TO AID THE ALAMO DEFENDERS. THEY ARRIVED AT THE ALAMO ON MARCH 1, 1836. WILLIAM E. SUMMERS PERISHED AT THE ALAMO ON MARCH 6, 1836 ALONG WITH THE OTHER MEN WHO DIED FOR TEXAS INDEPENDENCE.

=== Namesakes ===
- Floyd County is named for Immortal Dolphin Ward Floyd
- Kent County is named for Immortal Andrew Kent
- Kimble County is named for Immortal George Kimble
- King County is named for Immortal William Philip King
- Cottle County is named for Immortal George W. Cottle

=== Portrayal in media ===
- 1911: The Immortal Alamo, a silent feature film based on the Battle of the Alamo.
- 1915: Martyrs of the Alamo, a feature film based on the Siege of Béxar, Battle of the Alamo, and Battle of San Jacinto.
- 1937: Heroes of the Alamo, is a low-budget filmed Texas Revolution and the Battle of the Alamo.
- 1955: Davy Crockett, King of the Wild Frontier, a feature film based on Davy Crockett at the Battle of the Alamo.
- 1955: The Last Command, a feature film based on Jim Bowie and the Battle of the Alamo.
- 1960: The Alamo, a feature film based on the Battle of the Alamo.
- 1987: The Alamo: 13 Days to Glory, a 3-hour miniseries based on the Battle of the Alamo
- 2004: The Alamo, a feature film based on the Battle of the Alamo.
  - Immortal Almaron Dickinson portrayed by Stephen Bruton
  - Immortal Isaac Millsaps portrayed by Turk Pipkin
- 2015: Texas Rising, a 10-hour miniseries based on the Texas Revolution.
- 2018: The Men Who Built America: Frontiersmen ("Empire or Liberty"), an episode based on the Battle of the Alamo.

== See also ==
- Old Eighteen
- Texian Militia
- Texas Military Forces
- Texas Military Department
- List of conflicts involving the Texas Military
- Awards and decorations of the Texas Military
