= Albert Martin (soldier) =

Soldier

- Albert Martin
- Born: January 6, 1808; Providence, Rhode Island
- Died: March 6, 1836 (aged 28); Alamo Mission, San Antonio, Republic of Texas
- Education: American Literary, Scientific and Military Academy
- Military career
- Allegiance: Republic of Texas
- Branch: (Republic of Texas) Texas Army
- Service years: 1835-1836
- Rank: Captain
- Units: Old Eighteen; Immortal 32
- Conflicts: Texas Revolution; Battle of Gonzales; Siege of Bexar; Siege of the Alamo; Battle of the Alamo †

Albert Martin (January 6, 1808 – March 6, 1836) was a Texian merchant and captain of the Gonzales Mounted Rangers who delivered William B. Travis' letter "To the People of Texas & All Americans in the World" and died while defending the Alamo garrison. He is a member of the Old Eighteen and Immortal 32.

== Early life and career ==
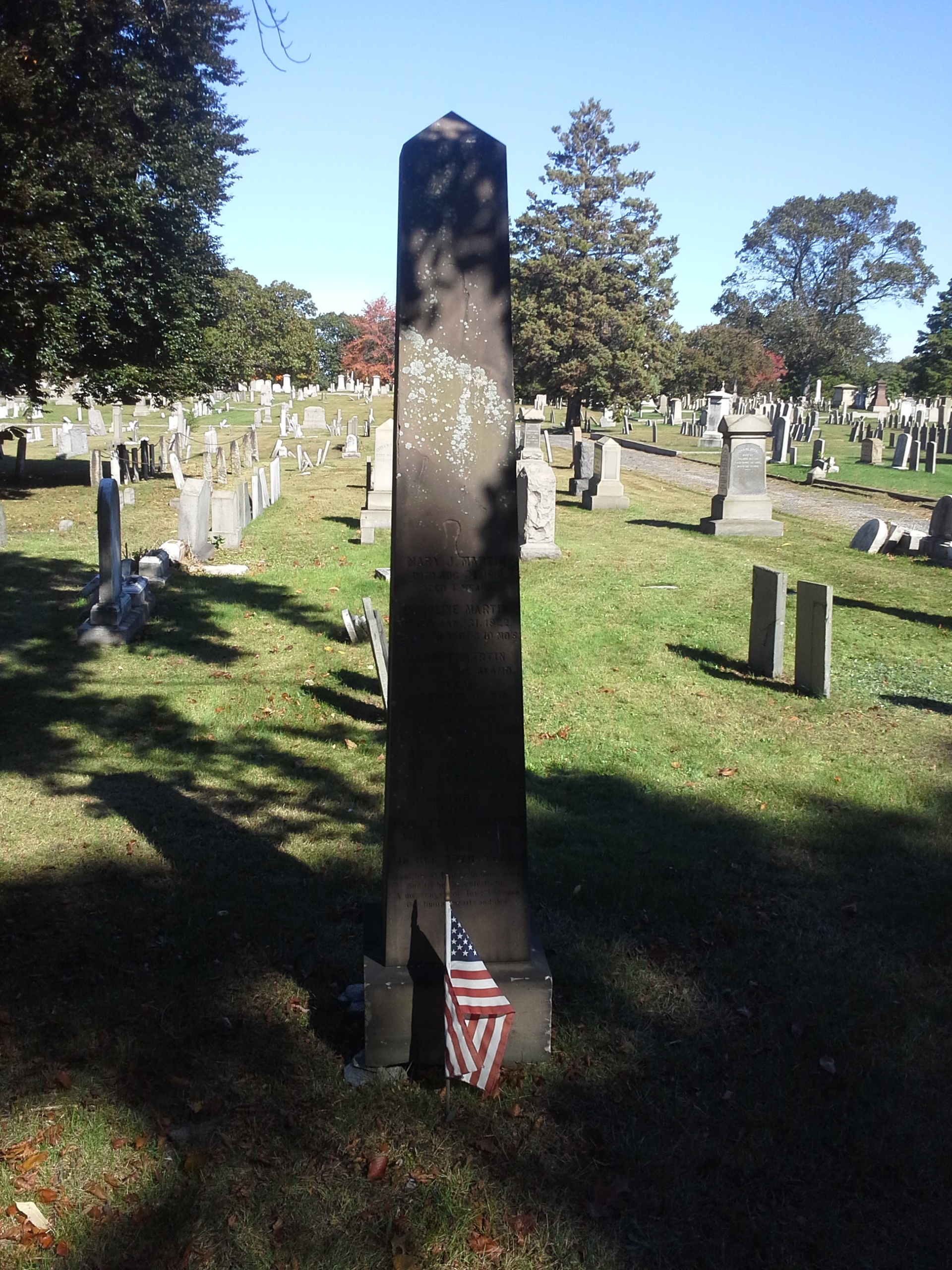
Martin's grave (cenotaph) memorial in Providence, RI, referencing the Alamo

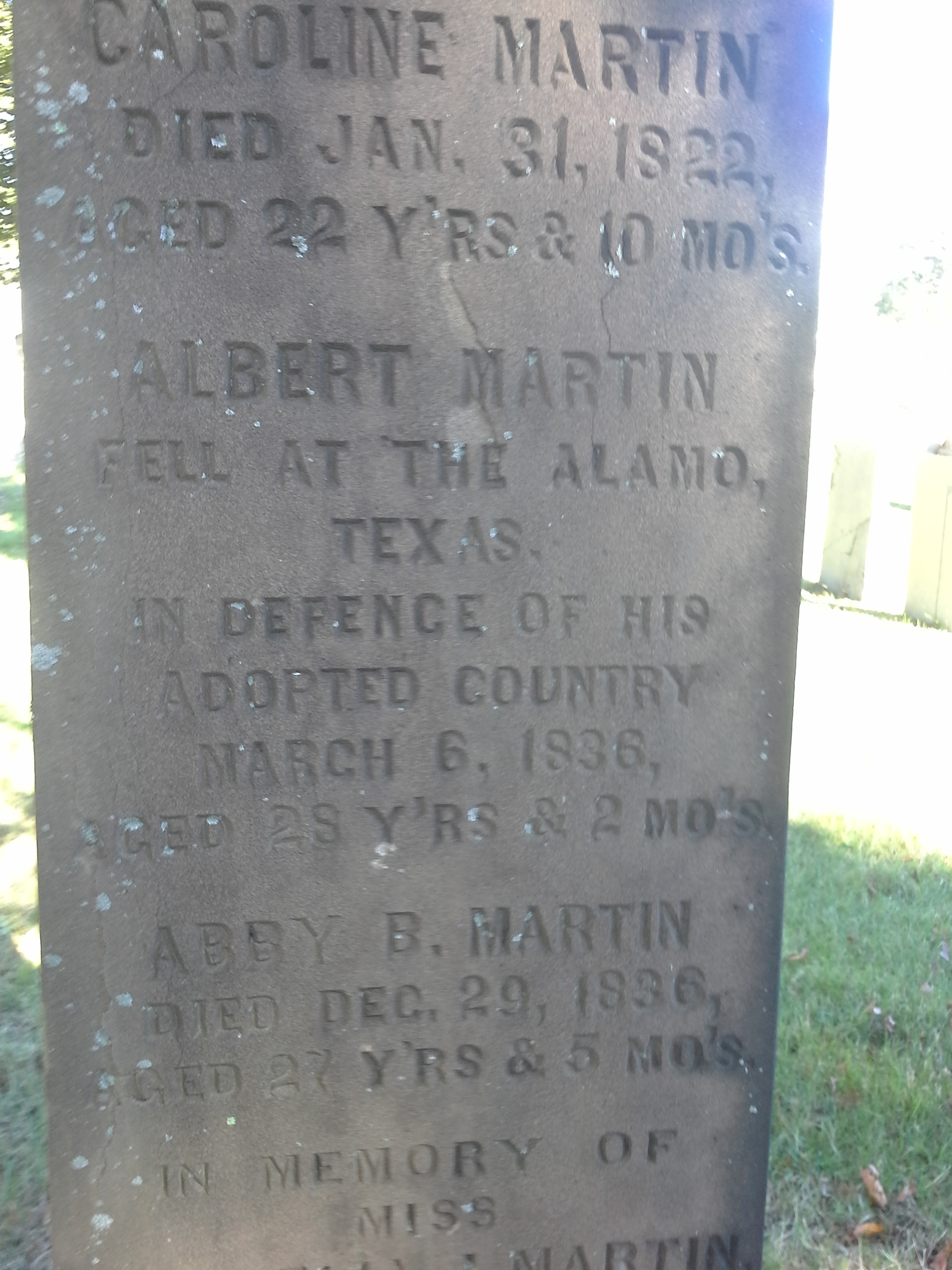
Martin's grave (cenotaph) memorial in Providence, RI

Martin was born in Providence, Rhode Island to Joseph S. Martin, a merchant, and Abbey B. Martin. Martin's parents were fourth cousins, and both of their fathers both fought in the Revolutionary War. Albert Martin attended Vermont's Norwich University, which was then known as the American Literary, Scientific and Military Academy. Then, following his father, a merchant, and older brothers, Albert Martin left Rhode Island in 1832 and went to Texas by way of Tennessee and New Orleans, where he joined Martin, Coffin & Company. With his growing family, Martin eventually moved to Gonzales, Texas by 1835 where he ran a successful general store business affiliated with Martin, Coffin & Co.

== Texas Revolution ==
=== Soldier ===
At the outbreak of the Texas Revolution, Martin was one of the defenders of Gonzales known as the "Old Eighteen," who protected the "Come and Take It" cannon. He was part of the Texas force during the Siege of Bexar in the fall of 1835 and then by December returned to Gonzales to recover from an ax injury for a period before returning to Bexar.

=== Alamo courier ===
On February 23, 1836, the first day of the siege of the Alamo, Lt. Col. William B. Travis sent Captain Martin as an emissary to meet Gen. Antonio López de Santa Anna's adjutant, Col. Juan N. Almonte. Almonte rejected Martin's invitation to come to the Alamo and speak directly to Travis. The next day, Martin left the Alamo carrying Travis's famous letter "To the People of Texas," which he delivered to Lancelot Smither in Gonzales.

=== Ranger Captain ===
In Gonzales, a relief force was organized to support the Alamo's scant defenders despite Martin's father's warnings not to return to the Alamo. On March 1, 1836 Martin returned to the Alamo with the supporting force from Gonzales, numbering approximately thirty-two. On March 6, 1836 Martin was killed in the Battle of the Alamo. Martin's obituary was published in the Manufacturers and Farmers Journal and the New Orleans True American in July 1836.

== Legacy ==
In the North Burial Ground in Providence, Rhode Island there is a slender, red stone memorial marker from 1858 or earlier that states

Albert Martin Fell at the Alamo, Texas, In Defense of his country March 6, 1836, Aged 28 yrs & 2 mo's.

Within the cemetery, the memorial is near Central, Summit, and Elm Avenues and is Rhode Island's only memorial to the Alamo. Although Albert Martin's body was likely burned and his ashes scattered in Texas by the Mexican troops, the cenotaph memorializes his death at the Martin family plot in Providence.

A later plaque at the Alamo incorrectly stated that Martin was from Tennessee.

In 2012 Albert Martin was inducted in the Rhode Island Heritage Hall of Fame.

== See also ==
- List of Alamo defenders
- Immortal 32
- Texian Militia
- List of conflicts involving the Texas Military
