= George Washington Cottle =

George Washington Cottle (1811 – March 6, 1836) was a Texian who died at the Battle of the Alamo. He is a member of the Immortal 32. His brother, Almon Cottle, is a member of the Old Eighteen.

Cottle was born in Missouri and arrived in Texas with his parents, Jonathan and Margaret Cottle, several siblings, and three cousins 0n July 6, 1829, where he settled in DeWitt's Colony on the Lavaca River. Cottle received a league of land at the headwaters of the Lavaca River near Gonzales on September 12, 1832. He married his cousin Eliza Cottle (daughter of his uncle Isaac Cottle and Mary Ann Williams Cottle) on November 7, 1830. They had a daughter, Melzenia, in 1831 and divorced October 7, 1834. One source (https://www.tshaonline.org/handbook/online/articles/fco81) says the marriage was annulled.

On June 21, 1835, at Gonzales, Texas, he married Nancy (Curtis) Oliver, widow of John Oliver. When Mexican troops arrived south of Gonzales in September 1835, Cottle was one of the messengers sent to gather reinforcements. He returned to fight in the Battle of Gonzales on October 2, 1835. In February 1836, he lent a yoke of oxen to Capt. Mathew Caldwell's company. He enlisted in the Gonzales Ranging Company under Lt. George C. Kimbell on February 24, 1836, and rode with 32 others to the Alamo on March 1, 1836. Cottle was killed on March 6, 1836, at the battle of the Alamo, alongside his brother-in-law, Thomas Jackson. His twin sons Thomas Jackson Cottle (named after George's brother-in-law, who also died in the Alamo) and George Washington Cottle (Junior) were born March 31, 1836, just 25 days after their father died in the Battle of the Alamo. The twins died in infancy. Nancy Curtis Oliver Cottle later married again to John C. Cooksey.

Cottle County, Texas, is named for him.

== See also ==
- Texian Militia
- List of conflicts involving the Texas Military
