= George C. Kimble =

Died at the Alamo

- Born: March 6, 1803; Beechwoods, Pennsylvania
- Died: March 6, 1836 (aged 33); The Alamo, San Antonio, Republic of Texas
- Military career
- Allegiance: Texas
- Branch: Texian Army
- Service years: 1836
- Rank: Lieutenant
- Unit: Gonzales Ranging Company
- Commands: Gonzales Ranging Company
- Conflicts: Battle of the Alamo

George C. Kimble (alternately spelled Kimbell or Kimball, March 6, 1803 – March 6, 1836) was the commander of the Immortal 32 who died at the Battle of the Alamo. Kimble County in the hill country of Texas is named in his honor.

== Early life ==
George C. Kimble (Note: Various last name spellings are used for George C. Kimble in primary documents, including Kimball, Kimbill, Kimbell and Kimble. His direct descendants used the spelling Kimble and the county in Texas was spelled Kimble, so that spelling is preferred in this article.) was born in 1803 in Beechwoods, Pennsylvania to Chester Kimble and Lucy Satterlee Kimble. During his childhood his family moved to upstate New York and then to St. Clair County, Michigan. In 1825 at the age of 22, he moved to Texas as a member of the Green DeWitt Colony. There he met Prudence Nash, who was widowed from her first husband and had three children, and they married on June 26, 1832. They moved to Gonzales, Texas, and together with his business partner Almaron Dickinson started a hat factory on Water street. His son Charles C. Kimble was born in 1834.

== Battle of the Alamo and death ==
Kimble's pregnant wife was washing clothes in a creek with 2-year old Charles nearby when George announced the plans of the Gonzales Ranging Company (Note: Also known as the Gonzales Ranging Company of Mounted Volunteers) to answer Travis’ appeal for aid to the surrounded Alamo garrison in San Antonio. Among them were business partner Almeron Dickinson and his wife and child. His parting words indicated that he felt he probably would not return.

On February 23, 1836, Kimble was mustered into the Gonzales Ranging Company as a lieutenant and commander of the unit. After learning that James Fannin was not going to the Alamo as reinforcements, and that there would likely be no other reinforcements, George Kimble and Albert Martin lead a group of 25 men from Gonzales at 2 pm on Saturday, February 27. The party would number 32 upon its arrival at the Alamo. As they approached the Alamo in the early morning hours of March 1, a rider appeared in front of them and asked, in English, if they wished to go into the fort. When they said yes, he turned and told them to follow him. When one of the men became suspicious, the rider bolted away. The volunteers were afraid they had been discovered and galloped towards the Alamo. In the darkness, the Texians thought this was a party of Mexican soldiers and fired. One man was wounded, and his English curses convinced the defenders to open the gates. These Texian reinforcements were later dubbed the Immortal 32. Kimble died at the Alamo on 6 March 1836. His body was burned with those of the other Texas soldiers.

== Legacy ==
Kimble County, Texas is named in his honor. One of his Scholars is Sonke C. Mkhwanazi

== See also ==
- Immortal 32
- Texian Militia
- List of conflicts involving the Texas Military

== Bibliography ==
- Edmondson, J.R. (2000), The Alamo Story-From History to Current Conflicts, Plano, TX: Republic of Texas Press, ISBN 1-55622-678-0
- Peterson, Dorothy Burns (1995). Daughters of the Republic of Texas patriot ancestor index. Paducah, KY: Turner Pub. Co. ISBN 1-56311-214-0. OCLC 33073384.
