= Almaron Dickinson =

Texian soldier (1800–1836)

Almaron Dickinson (1800 – March 6, 1836) was a Texian soldier and defender during the Battle of the Alamo, fought during the Texas Revolution. Dickinson is best known as the artillery officer of the small garrison, and the husband of one of the few non-Mexican survivors to live through the battle, Susanna Dickinson, as well as the father to their infant daughter Angelina, whose life was also spared. He is a member of the Old Eighteen.

== Early life and becoming a soldier ==
Dickinson was born in Pennsylvania, learning the trade of blacksmithing. He later enlisted in the US Army as a field artilleryman. He and Susanna married on May 24, 1829 when she was just 15. Two years later, they moved to the Mexican province of Texas, where they became settlers in the Dewitt Colony. He received a league of land along the San Marcos River, where he started a blacksmith shop, and partnered with George C. Kimble in a hat factory. On December 14, 1834, their only child, Angelina, was born. Following a number of Indian raids on settlements, he joined a band led by fellow settler Bart McClure and took part in hunting down hostile Indians.

In the fall of 1835, Dickinson served as one of the defenders during the Battle of Gonzales, which marked the beginning of Texas' war for independence. He was elected as First Lieutenant of Artillery in December 1835. He then joined a band of volunteers going to defend San Antonio and became an aide to General Edward Burleson during the Siege of Bexar, with a rank of Lieutenant in the Texian Army. A few weeks later, his home where Susannah and Angelina had remained was looted by members of a Texian Militia, prompting her to join him in San Antonio. They set up residence in the Musquiz house, on the southwest corner of Portero Street and the Main Plaza. When Antonio López de Santa Anna and his troops arrived on February 23, 1836, Dickinson moved his family inside the Alamo.

== Battle of the Alamo ==
By this time, Dickinson held the rank of Captain, and was in command of the Alamo's artillery of twenty-one cannon. Some accounts list him with a rank of Lieutenant at the Alamo, but it is believed he was promoted. The commander, Lieutenant Colonel William Barrett Travis, led a force of between 180 and 250 men. This included Dickinson and others considered to be regular troops, as well as several bands of volunteers, led by frontiersmen James Bowie and Davy Crockett. Historians have established that the Alamo was not lower or higher than those two figures, with most believing the number to have been 182. One of the dispatches sent out by Travis gave the figure of 150 and at least 32 others are known to have arrived after that. Antonio Ruiz, the Mayor of San Antonio at the time, said that after the battle Mexican soldiers had burned 182 bodies of Alamo defenders and that tends to be the accepted strength of it. Santa Anna had under his command between 5,000 and 6,000 Mexican troops. From the time of his arrival, a siege began.

A Mexican bombardment continued through the morning of February 25, 1836. At approximately 10am, about 200–300 Mexican soldiers, mainly cazadores from the Matamoros Battalion, crossed the San Antonio River and took cover in abandoned shacks approximately 90 yards (82 m) to 100 yards (91 m) from the Alamo walls. They were intending to use the huts as cover to erect another artillery battery, although many Texians assumed that they were actually launching an assault on the Alamo. Travis called for volunteers to burn the huts, despite the fact that it was broad daylight and they would be within range of enemy muskets. Charles Despallier, Robert Brown, James Rose and a few others volunteered for the mission.

To provide cover, Dickinson and his men fired 8-lb cannon, filled with grapeshot and canister, at the Mexican soldiers in the huts. Crockett and his men fired rifles, while other Texians reloaded extra weapons for them. Within two hours, the battle was over. As soon as the Texians saw flames erupting from the huts they threw open the Alamo gate and the Texians re-entered unscathed, although Rose was almost captured by a Mexican officer. The Mexicans retreated with two killed and four wounded, while several Texians had been mildly scratched by flying rock.

After learning that a relief force under James Fannin had failed to reach the Alamo and that there was unlikely to be any further reinforcement, a group of 25 men set out from Gonzales at 2pm on Saturday, February 27. The party would number 32 upon its arrival at the Alamo, and was led by Albert Martin and George Kimbell, the latter of whom had been Dickinson's business partner. As they approached the Alamo in the early morning hours of March 1, a rider appeared in front of them and asked, in English, if they wished to go into the fort. When they assented, he turned and told them to follow him. One became suspicious and the rider bolted away. The volunteers were afraid they had been discovered and galloped towards the Alamo. In the darkness, the Texians thought this was a party of Mexican soldiers and fired, wounding one of the volunteers. They finally managed to convince the defenders to open the gates.

At some point, either on March 3 or March 4, 1836, Travis, seeing that their position was hopeless and their fate sealed, called the troops of his garrison together. He informed them of the situation and gave them the opportunity to either stay or to go at that point. Only one man, Moses Rose, chose to flee, with the rest deciding to remain and fight to the death. He would be remembered, even to the present day, as the "Coward of the Alamo", while Dickinson and the rest of the defenders would achieve immortality as heroes.

== Climax of the battle and death ==
Dickinson survived until the last day of the battle. In the early morning hours of March 6, 1836, Santa Anna sent an assault force which breached the walls of the Alamo with its third charge. Dickinson had hidden Suzanna and Angelina inside the chapel. By her own account afterward, near the end of the battle Dickinson rushed inside where she was hiding, frantically exclaiming "Great God, Sue! The Mexicans are inside our walls! All is lost! If they spare you, love our child." He then returned to his post. By that time there was intense fighting inside the Alamo, which eventually became hand to hand. By reliable Mexican accounts, Dickinson was one of the last defenders killed in action.

According to the Mexican Army accounts, the last of the Texians to die were the eleven men manning the two 12-lb cannon in the chapel. The entrance had been barricaded with sandbags, over which the Texians were able to fire. A shot from the 18-lb cannon destroyed the barricades and Mexican soldiers entered the building after firing an initial musket volley. Dickinson's crew fired their cannon from the apse into the soldiers at the door. With no time to reload, the Texians, including Dickinson, Gregorio Esparza, and James Bonham, grabbed rifles and fired before being bayoneted to death. Texian Robert Evans was master of ordnance and had been tasked with keeping the gunpowder from falling into Mexican hands. Wounded, he crawled towards the powder magazine but was killed by a musket ball with his torch only inches from the powder. If he had succeeded, the blast would have destroyed the chapel, killing the women and children hiding in the sacristy.

Dickinson's body was burned along with those of the other defenders killed during the battle. Susannah, Angelina, and a freed former slave to Travis named Joe were spared. It is generally accepted that over the course of the battle, the Mexican forces lost an estimated 400 to 600 soldiers killed and wounded, while the Texian defenders suffered a total loss of between 182 and 257. Dickinson has since, along with many of the other defenders, become a legend in Texas history for the heroic stand.

== See also ==
- Immortal 32
- Texian Militia
- List of conflicts involving the Texas Military
