= Raoul Josset =

French sculptor

Raoul Jean Josset (9 December 1892 – 29 June 1957) was a French-born American sculptor. He was born in Tours.

During the First World War, he worked as an interpreter for American forces in France. He was a pupil of Antoine Bourdelle between 1920 and 1926. He came to Chicago, Illinois, in 1932 with his longtime collaborator Jose Martin to pursue a job with the Northwestern Terra Cotta Company only to find the job closed. However, he developed plenty of work, first in Illinois, briefly with Cowan Pottery in Lakewood, Ohio, and then principally in Texas. In 1953 he was elected into the National Academy of Design as an Associate Academician.

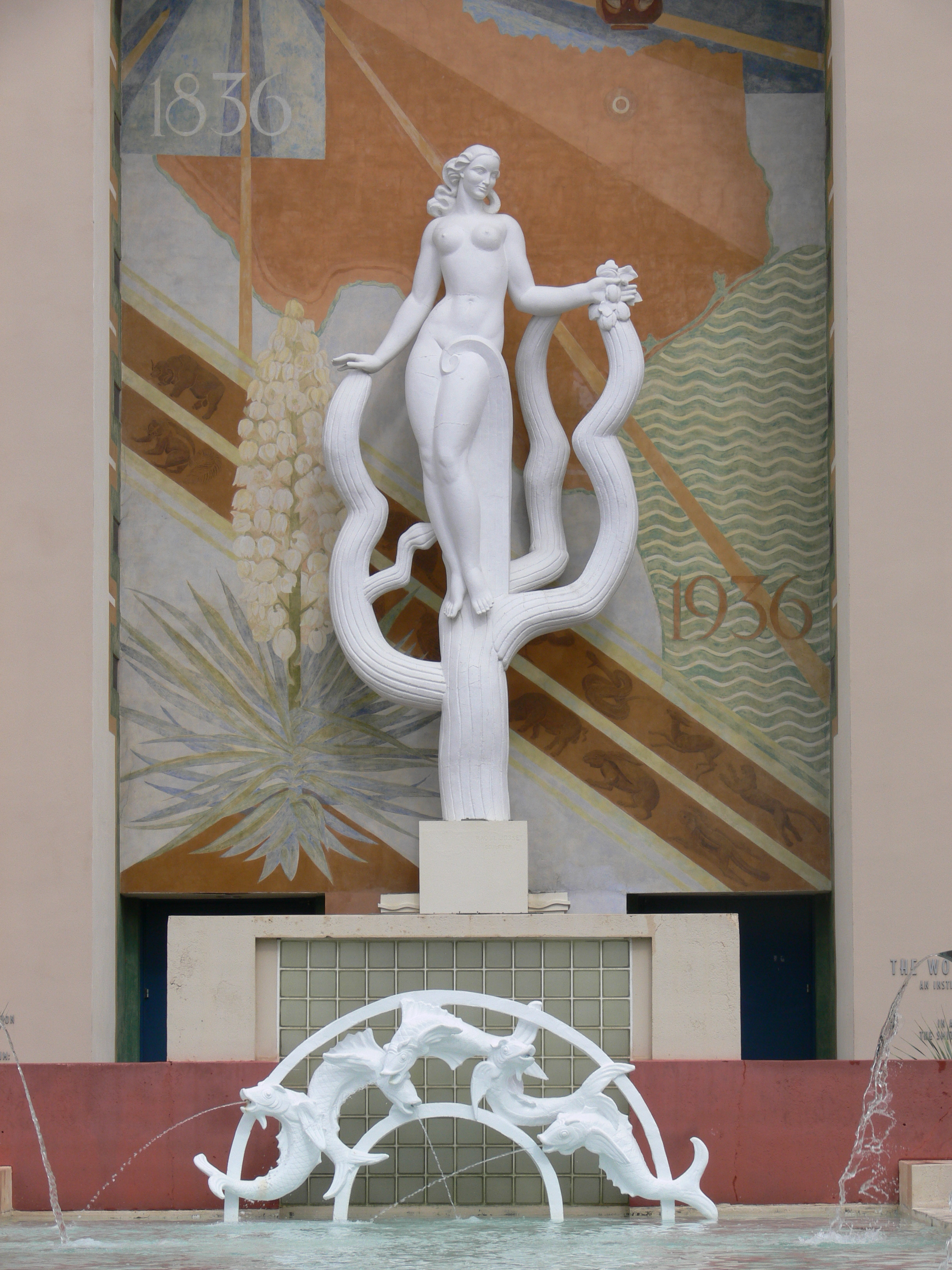
Hall of Administration, now The Women's Museum, Dallas, Texas, 1936

== Main works ==
- The sculptures of the bell tower and a Christ on a cross in the church of Roupy, 1922
- Monument to the dead of the 1914–1918 war in Châtillon-sur-Seine
- Sculpted pylons, Lincoln Memorial Bridge between Vincennes, Indiana and Illinois, 1933
- Darius-Girėnas Memorial, Marquette Park, Chicago, Illinois, 1935
- Immortal 32 Centennial Monument, Gonzales Memorial Museum, Gonzales, Texas, 1936
- Spirit of the Centennial Statue, Administration Building of the Texas Centennial Exposition (now The Women's Museum), Fair Park, Dallas, Texas, 1936
- Work, Houston City Hall, Houston, Texas, 1936 (with Matchett Herring Coe)
- Winged Angel Statue, Monument Hill and Kreische Brewery State Historic Sites, La Grange, Texas, 1936
- Fannin Memorial Monument, Goliad State Park and Historic Site, Goliad, Texas, 1939
- Excelsior, 1939 New York World's Fair, New York State Pavilion, 1939
- George Childress Statue, Washington-on-the-Brazos Historical Site, Washington, Texas, 1939
