= To the People of Texas & All Americans in the World =

1836 open letter written by William B. Travis

Travis's letter

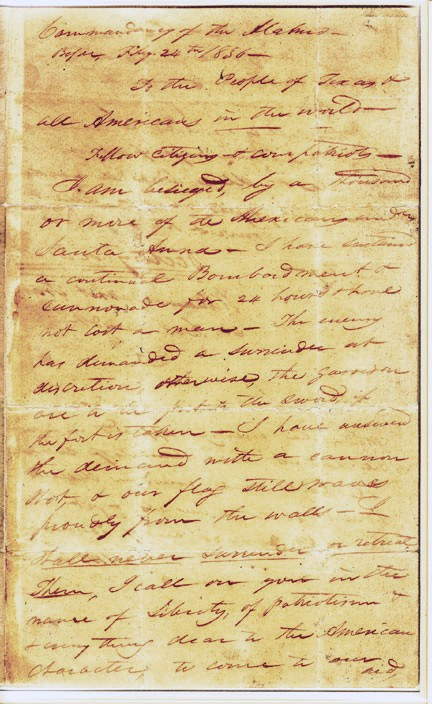
The first page of William Barret Travis's letter, To the People of Texas & All Americans in the World

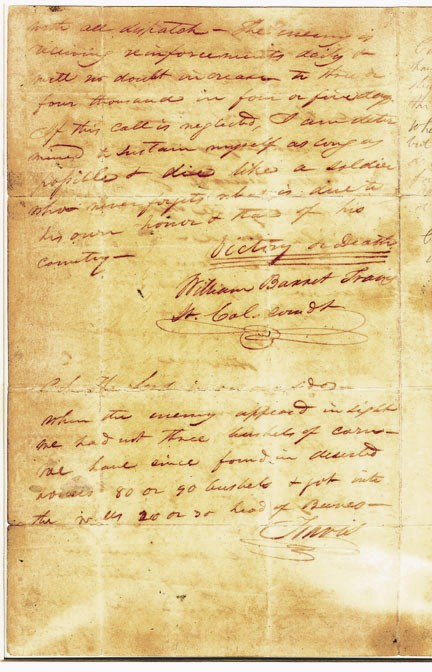
The second page of the letter

To the People of Texas & All Americans in the World, commonly referred to as the Victory or Death letter, is an open letter written on February 24, 1836, by William B. Travis, commander of the Texian forces at the Battle of the Alamo, to settlers in Mexican Texas. The letter is renowned as a "declaration of defiance" and a "masterpiece of American patriotism", and forms part of the history education of Texas schoolchildren.

On February 23, the Alamo Mission in San Antonio, Texas had been besieged by Mexican forces led by General Antonio López de Santa Anna. Fearing that his small group of men could not withstand an assault, Travis wrote this letter seeking reinforcements and supplies from supporters. The letter closes with Travis's vow of "Victory or Death!", an emotion which has been both praised and derided by historians.

The letter was initially entrusted to courier Albert Martin, who carried it to the town of Gonzales some seventy miles away. Martin added several postscripts to encourage men to reinforce the Alamo, and then handed the letter to Launcelot Smither. Smither added his own postscript and delivered the letter to its intended destination, San Felipe de Austin. Local publishers printed over 700 copies of the letter. It also appeared in the two main Texas newspapers and was eventually printed throughout the United States and Europe. Partially in response to the letter, men from throughout Texas and the United States began to gather in Gonzales. Between 32 and 90 of them reached the Alamo before it fell; the remainder formed the nucleus of the army which eventually defeated Santa Anna at the Battle of San Jacinto.

Following the end of the Texas Revolution, the original letter was delivered to Travis's family in Alabama, and in 1893, one of his descendants sold it to the State of Texas for $85 ($3,046 today). For many decades it was displayed at the Texas State Library; the original letter was then placed in a dark space for conservation purposes, and the display is now an exact facsimile. It is decorated by a portrait of Travis.

== Background ==
The Mexican Constitution of 1824 liberalized the country's immigration policies, allowing foreigners to settle in border regions such as Mexican Texas. People flocked to the area; an 1834 census estimated the Texas population at 7,800 Mexicans and 30,000 English-speaking people primarily from the United States. (Note: As a comparison, in 1825, the Texas population comprised approximately 3,500 people of Mexican descent, with few English-speaking settlers. (Edmondson (2000), p. 75.)) Among the immigrants was William Barret Travis, an Alabama native who had variously worked as a teacher, a newspaper publisher, and a lawyer. An avid reader, Travis often devoured a novel in a single day. His taste ran primarily to romantic adventure and history, especially the novels of Sir Walter Scott and Benjamin Disraeli and the historical works of Herodotus. Historians have speculated that Travis's choice of reading material may have affected his behavior—Travis was known for his melodramatic ways.

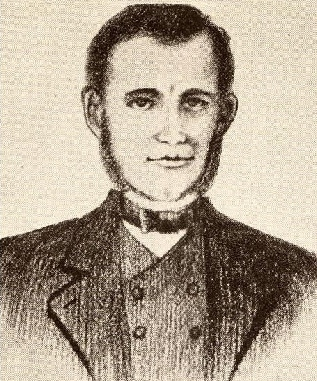
William Barret Travis

In May 1831, Travis opened a law office in Anahuac, Texas. Almost immediately, he and his law partner, Patrick Jack, clashed with the local military commander, Juan Davis Bradburn. Their subsequent actions were instrumental in causing the May 1832 Anahuac Disturbances. According to historian William C. Davis, Bradburn "overreacted and made heroes of two local malcontents whose actions their own people otherwise had not been much inclined to sanction". Bradburn was forced to resign his post and flee Texas.

The Anahuac Disturbances coincided with a Mexican civil war. Texians aligned themselves with proponents of federalism advocating a stronger role for state governments, in opposition to a centralized government that set most policies at the national level. The federalists prevailed, and their favored general, Antonio López de Santa Anna, was elected president. In 1835, Santa Anna began consolidating power; in response federalists launched armed rebellion in several Mexican states. Travis, an ardent foe of centralism, led an attack on Anahuac in June 1835 and forced the Mexican garrison to surrender. Many Texas settlers thought Travis's action was imprudent, and he was forced to apologize. Although the Mexican government issued a warrant for his arrest, local authorities did not enforce it.

Texians became increasingly discontented with the government as Santa Anna positioned himself as a dictator. In October, the Texas Revolution began and delegates appointed a provisional government. Travis was commissioned lieutenant colonel in the new regular army and asked to raise a cavalry company. He participated in the siege of Béxar, where he proved to be "an impulsive, occasionally insubordinate, officer".

By the end of 1835, Texians had expelled all Mexican troops from Texas. Believing the war ended, many Texians resigned from the army and returned home. In January, the provisional government essentially collapsed; despite a lack of authority for any branch of government to interfere with other branches, the legislature impeached Governor Henry Smith, who in turn disbanded the legislature. No one in Texas was entirely sure who was in charge.

Even as Texian governmental authority declined, rumors flew that Santa Anna would personally lead an invasion of Texas to quell the rebellion. Despite this news, Texian army strength continued to dwindle. Texas settlers were divided on whether they were fighting for independence or a return to a federalist government in Mexico. The confusion caused many settlers to remain at home or to return home. Fewer than 100 Texian soldiers remained garrisoned at the Alamo Mission in San Antonio de Béxar (now San Antonio, Texas). Their commander, James C. Neill, feared that his small force would be unable to withstand an assault by the Mexican troops. In response to Neill's repeated requests for reinforcements, Governor Smith assigned Travis and 30 men to the Alamo; they arrived on February 3. Most of the Texians, including Travis, believed that any Mexican invasion was months away.

== Composition of the letter ==
Travis assumed command of the Alamo garrison on February 11, when Neill was granted a furlough. (Note: The volunteers already gathered in the Alamo did not accept the appointment of Travis, a regular army officer. They instead elected James Bowie as their commander. Bowie and Travis shared command until the morning of February 24, when Bowie collapsed from illness. At that point, Travis assumed sole command. (Hardin (1994), pp. 117–20.)) On February 23, Santa Anna arrived in Béxar at the head of approximately 1500 Mexican troops. The 150 Texian soldiers were unprepared for this development. As they rushed to the Alamo, Texians quickly herded cattle into the complex and scrounged for food in nearby houses. (Note: Many residents of San Antonio de Béxar had fled when they learned that the Mexican Army was approaching, leaving most of the homes empty. (Edmondson (2000), p. 301.)) The Mexican army initiated a siege of the Alamo and raised a blood-red flag signaling no quarter. Travis responded with a blast from the Alamo's largest cannon.

The first night of the siege was largely quiet. The following afternoon, Mexican artillery began firing on the Alamo. Mexican Colonel Juan Almonte wrote in his diary that the bombardment dismounted two of the Alamo's guns, including the massive 18-pounder cannon. The Texians quickly returned both weapons to service. Shortly after, Travis wrote an open letter pleading for reinforcements from "the people of Texas & All Americans in the World".

To the People of Texas & All Americans in the World:

Fellow citizens & compatriots—I am besieged, by a thousand or more of the Mexicans under Santa Anna—I have sustained a continual Bombardment & cannonade for 24 hours & have not lost a man. The enemy has demanded a surrender at discretion, otherwise, the garrison are to be put to the sword, if the fort is taken—I have answered the demand with a cannon shot, & our flag still waves proudly from the walls. I shall never surrender or retreat. Then, I call on you in the name of Liberty, of patriotism & everything dear to the American character, to come to our aid, with all dispatch—The enemy is receiving reinforcements daily & will no doubt increase to three or four thousand in four or five days. If this call is neglected, I am determined to sustain myself as long as possible & die like a soldier who never forgets what is due to his own honor & that of his country—Victory or Death.

William Barret Travis

Lt. Col. comdt

P.S. The Lord is on our side—When the enemy appeared in sight we had not three bushels of corn—We have since found in deserted houses 80 or 90 bushels & got into the walls 20 or 30 head of Beeves.

Travis (Note: "I shall never surrender or retreat" was underlined once, while "Victory or Death" was underlined thrice. (Green (1988), p. 492.))

== Distribution ==
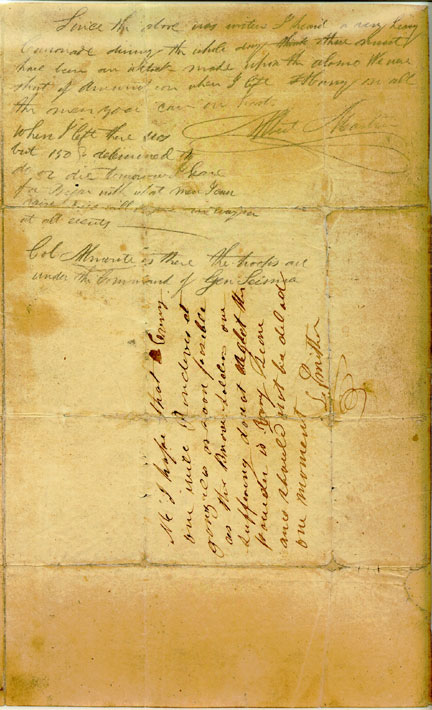
Both Albert Martin and Launcelot Smither added postscripts to the back of Travis's letter. The two postscripts are visible in this scan of the document.

Travis entrusted the letter to courier Albert Martin, who rode through the night to cover the 70 miles (110 km) to the closest town, Gonzales, as quickly as possible. During his journey, Martin added two postscripts. The first relayed Martin's fear that the Mexican army had already attacked the Alamo (Note: Martin had heard cannon fire as he left the Alamo. (Green (1988), p. 493.)) and ended "Hurry on all the men you can in haste". The second postscript is more difficult to read, as the letter was later folded along one line of text. The paper has since partially frayed along the fold, obliterating several words. The gist of the message, however, is that the men at the Alamo were "determined to do or die", and Martin intended to gather reinforcements and return as quickly as possible.

In Gonzales, Martin turned the letter over to Launcelot Smither. When the Mexican army arrived in Béxar, Smither had immediately set out for Gonzales. Travis may have sent him as an official courier, or he may have journeyed there on his own to warn the townspeople. Smither added his own message under Martin's, encouraging men to gather in Gonzales to go to the relief of the Texians at the Alamo.

Before departing Gonzales, Smither gave a letter to Andrew Ponton, the alcalde (or mayor) of the town. This second letter may have actually been the reason Smither traveled to Gonzales, or it might have been a paraphrased version of the letter Martin had delivered. The copy read:

To All the Inhabitants of Texas:

In a few words there is 2000 Mexican soldiers in Bexar, and 150 Americans in the Alamo. Sesma is at the head of them, and from best accounts that can be obtained, they intend to show no quarter. If every man cannot turn out to a man every man in the Alamo will be murdered.

They have not more than 8 or 10 days provisions. They say they will defend it or die on the ground. Provisions, ammunition and Men, or suffer your men to be murdered in the Fort. If you do not turn out Texas is gone. I left Bexar on the 23rd at 4 P.M. By order of
W.V. [sic] Travis
L. Smither (Note: Many at the Alamo believed that General Joaquín Ramírez y Sesma was commanding the Mexican troops, and that Santa Anna would arrive soon with further reinforcements. (Edmondson (2000), p. 349.))

Ponton sent the Smither copy of the letter to Colonel Henry Raguet, the commander of the Committee of Vigilance and Safety in Nacogdoches. Raguet kept the letter he received and sent a copy, with his additional comments, to Dr. John Sibley, the chairman of the Committee of Vigilance and Safety for Texas Affairs in Natchitoches, Louisiana.

Smither rode hard and delivered Travis's letter to San Felipe de Austin in fewer than 40 hours. In a hurriedly organized meeting, town leaders passed a series of resolutions pledging assistance to the Alamo defenders. The results of the meeting were printed in a broadsheet alongside a reproduction of Travis's letter. After distributing all 200 copies of their initial print run, newspaper publishers Joseph Baker and Thomas Borden made at least four other reproductions of the letter, resulting in more than 500 additional copies. Their final printing included a message from Governor Henry Smith urging the colonists "to fly to the aid of your besieged countrymen and not permit them to be massacred by a mercenary foe. ... The call is upon ALL who are able to bear arms, to rally without one moment's delay, or in fifteen days the heart of Texas will be the seat of war." On March 2, the letter was printed in the Texas Republican. It appeared in the other major Texas newspaper, the Telegraph and Texas Register, three days later. The letter was eventually reprinted throughout the United States and much of Europe.

== Texan response ==
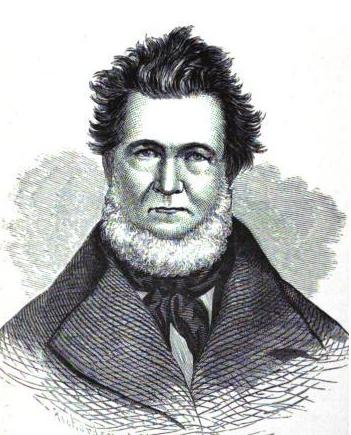
David G. Burnet. It is unlikely that he would have become interim president of the Republic of Texas had he not read Travis's letter.

This letter was one of several that Travis sent during the siege of the Alamo. Each carried a similar message—the Mexican army had invaded Texas, the Alamo was surrounded, and the Texans needed more men and ammunition to wage a successful defense. No assistance was forthcoming from the Texas government. By this point infighting had rendered the provisional government completely ineffective, and delegates convened on March 1 at the Convention of 1836 to create a new government. Most of the delegates believed that Travis exaggerated the difficulties he faced.

Many Texas residents disagreed with the convention's perception. As the message spread across Texas, settlers left their homes and assembled in Gonzales, where Colonel James Fannin was due to arrive with the remaining Texan Army troops. (Note: Fannin aborted his reinforcement mission on February 27 and returned to Goliad. (Edmondson (2000), pp. 324, 328.) He and many of his men were executed by Mexican troops during the Goliad Massacre in late March.) On February 27 one group of reinforcements impatiently set out on their own; as a result 32 additional Texans entered the Alamo. Research by historian Thomas Ricks Lindley indicates that an additional 50 or 60 men reinforced the Alamo on March 4.

Almost all of the Texans were killed at the Battle of the Alamo when the Mexican army attacked on March 6; Travis was likely the first to die. Unaware that the Alamo had fallen, reinforcements continued to assemble; over 400 Texans were waiting in Gonzales when news of the Texan defeat reached the town on March 11. Earlier that day, General Sam Houston, newly reappointed commander of the Texan Army, had arrived in Gonzales. On hearing of the Alamo's fall, Houston took command of the assembled volunteers. The following month, this hastily organized army defeated Santa Anna at the Battle of San Jacinto, ending the Texas Revolution.

This letter may have influenced the election of David G. Burnet as interim president of the new Republic of Texas. After reading one of the broadsheet versions of the letter, Burnet rushed to join Travis at the Alamo. After stopping at Washington-on-the-Brazos to recruit reinforcements from the men assembled at the Convention of 1836, Burnet became so "inspired by their deliberations" that he remained as a visitor. The convention declared independence from Mexico on March 2, but delegates feared for the safety of the new country's officers. Speaking privately with many of the delegates, Burnet professed his willingness to serve as president of a new republic, even if that made him a target of Santa Anna. The most popular delegates were absent from the convention on other business for the war effort. In the absence of interest in the position from most of those remaining, Burnet was nominated for president and defeated the only other candidate, Samuel Carson, by a 29–23 margin.

== Preservation ==
After the Texas Revolution ended, the original draft of the letter was given to Travis's family in Alabama. Several prominent Texians are known to have visited Travis's estranged wife shortly after the hostilities ended, but historians are unsure which of these men might have delivered the letter. Travis's daughter Susan (aged five at the time of his death) passed the letter down to her descendants; it eventually reached her great-grandson, John G. Davidson. In February 1891, Davidson lent the letter to the Texas Department of Agriculture, Insurance, Statistics, and History. Two years later, Davidson offered to sell the letter to the state of Texas for $250 ($8,958 today). This represented half of the annual sum allocated for collecting historical manuscripts, and the state was hesitant to agree. After negotiations, Davidson agreed to accept $85 ($3,046 today) for the letter, and on May 29 it officially passed into state ownership.

For many decades, the letter was publicly displayed, usually in a locked glass case with other manuscripts and artifacts from the Texas Revolution. At times, it was arranged alongside the Travis family Bible and a copy of Travis's will. In 1909, the letter was moved to the Texas State Library and has since left that building only twice; it was among 143 documents lent to the Committee on Historical Exhibits for the Texas Centennial Exposition in 1936, and it returned briefly to the site of the exposition in 1986. The original letter is no longer on permanent display. In its place is, in the words of Michael Green, former reference archivist for the Texas State Library Archives Division, "an exacting, one-of-a-kind facsimile". Directly over its display case is a portrait of Travis.

Four copies of the original broadsides are known to survive. One was placed for auction in 2004, where it was predicted to reach a price of over $250,000.

== Return to the Alamo ==
In October 2012, the Texas General Land Office announced plans to display the famous Travis Letter in the Alamo from February 23 to March 7, 2013. This marked the first time the iconic letter has returned to the Alamo since it was written by Travis. The display was free and open to the general public.

== Reception ==
Travis' letter is regarded as "the most famous document in Texas history", but its widespread distribution allowed an impact outside the relatively isolated settlements in Texas. Historians place the letter in a broader context, "as one of the masterpieces of American patriotism" or even "one of the greatest declarations of defiance in the English language". It is rare to see a book about the Alamo or the Texas Revolution which does not quote the letter, either in full or part. The letter also appears in full in most Texas history textbooks geared towards elementary and middle school children. The postscripts, however, have rarely been printed. Despite its asserted impact, minimal scholarship exists on the letter itself.

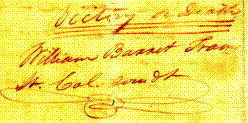
Travis concluded his letter with the words "Victory or Death", followed by his signature and title (Lt.Col. comdt). The word choice is patterned after Patrick Henry's cry "Liberty or Death!"

Almost from the moment of his arrival in Texas, Travis had attempted to influence the war agenda in Texas. As he realized the magnitude of the opposition he faced at the Alamo, the tone of Travis's writings shifted from perfunctory reports to the provisional government to more eloquent messages aimed at a wider audience. With limited time and opportunity to sway people to his way of thinking, Travis's success, and perhaps his very survival, would depend on his ability to "emotionally move the people". His previous work as a journalist likely gave him a good understanding of the type of language that would most resonate with his intended audience. Travis used this particular letter not only as a means to publicize his immediate need for reinforcements and supplies, but also to shape the debate within Texas by offering "a well-crafted provocation" that might incite others to take up arms. He chose "unambiguous and defiant" language, resulting in a "very powerful" message. The letter represented an unofficial declaration of independence for Texas. (Note: The Convention of 1836 did not officially declare independence for Texas until March 2. Alamo defenders were unaware of this development.) Its word usage evoked the American Revolution and Patrick Henry's famed cry of "Liberty or Death!"

Critics have derided the letter for its emotionalism, noting that it appears to show "a preoccupation with romance and chivalry" not uncommon to fans of Sir Walter Scott. In particular, they point to Travis's asserted determination to sacrifice his own life for a lost cause.

== Sources ==
- Davis, Joe Tom (1982). Legendary Texians. Vol. 1. Austin, TX: Eakin Press. ISBN 0-89015-336-1.
- Davis, William C. (2006). Lone Star Rising. College Station, TX: Texas A&M University Press. ISBN 978-1-58544-532-5. originally published 2004 by New York: Free Press
- Edmondson, J.R. (2000). The Alamo Story-From History to Current Conflicts. Plano, TX: Republic of Texas Press. ISBN 1-55622-678-0.
- Green, Michael R. (1 April 1988). "To the People of Texas and All the Americans in the World". The Southwestern Historical Quarterly. 91 (4). Texas State Historical Association: 483–508. JSTOR 30240052.
- Hardin, Stephen L. (1994). Texian Iliad. Austin, TX: University of Texas Press. ISBN 0-292-73086-1.
- Lindley, Thomas Ricks (2003). Alamo Traces: New Evidence and New Conclusions. Lanham, MD: Republic of Texas Press. ISBN 1-55622-983-6.
- Manchaca, Martha (2001). Recovering History, Constructing Race: The Indian, Black, and White Roots of Mexican Americans. The Joe R. and Teresa Lozano Long Series in Latin American and Latino Art and Culture. Austin, TX: University of Texas Press. ISBN 0-292-75253-9.
- McEnteer, James (2004). Deep in the Heart: The Texas Tendency in American Politics. Portsmouth, NH: Praeger Publishers. ISBN 978-0-275-98306-2.
- Petite, Mary Deborah (1999). 1836 Facts about the Alamo and the Texas War for Independence. Mason City, IA: Savas Publishing Company. ISBN 1-882810-35-X.
- Roberts, Randy; Olson, James S. (2001). A Line in the Sand: The Alamo in Blood and Memory. The Free Press. ISBN 0-684-83544-4.
- Schoelwer, Susan Prendergast (1985). Alamo Images: Changing Perceptions of a Texas Experience. Dallas, TX: The DeGlolyer Library and Southern Methodist University Press. ISBN 0-87074-213-2.
- Todish, Timothy J.; Todish, Terry; Spring, Ted (1998). Alamo Sourcebook, 1836: A Comprehensive Guide to the Battle of the Alamo and the Texas Revolution. Austin, TX: Eakin Press. ISBN 978-1-57168-152-2.
