= William B. Travis =

Texian Army officer and lawyer (1809–1836)

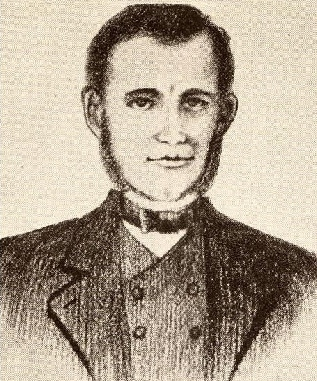
- William B. Travis in a sketch by Wyly Martin; it is the only known likeness of Travis drawn during his lifetime, although its accuracy has been questioned.
- Born: William Barret Travis; August 1, 1809; Saluda County, South Carolina, U.S.
- Died: March 6, 1836 (aged 26); San Antonio, Republic of Texas
- Military career
- Allegiance: Republic of Texas
- Branch: Texian Army
- Service years: 1835–1836
- Rank: Lieutenant-Colonel
- Nickname: Buck
- Commands: The Alamo
- Conflicts: Texas Revolution; Anahuac disturbances; Siege of Bexar; Battle of the Alamo †

William Barret "Buck" Travis (August 1, 1809 – March 6, 1836) was a Texian Army officer and lawyer. He is known for helping set the Texas Revolution in motion during the Anahuac disturbances and defending the Alamo Mission during the battle of the Alamo.

During the Mexican siege of the Alamo, Travis wrote a letter pleading for reinforcements that became known as the "Victory or Death" letter. When Travis and the defenders were defeated, killed, and burned by Santa Anna's army, it made him a martyr, and battle cry, for the cause of Texas independence. It is considered one of the most notable last stands in history. The battle cry of "Remember the Alamo" became the official motto of Texas from 1836 to 1930 and remains on the state seal. The Alamo is the number one tourist destination in Texas, a National Landmark, and a UNESCO World Heritage Site.

Fort Travis, Travis Park, Travis County, Lake Travis, Travis High School, Travis Early College High School, Travis Science Academy, William B. Travis Building (Austin), and 12 elementary schools are named in his honor.

== Early life ==
=== Ancestry, early years, and education ===
Travis's grandfather, Berwick (also known as Barrett) Travis, came from Great Britain to the Thirteen Colonies at the age of 12, where he was placed in indentured servitude for more than a decade. Berwick's ancestors came to North America in the late 17th century, and Berwick's grandfather was born in Perquimans County, North Carolina, but went back to Britain for his medical training. A descendant of the Travers of Tulketh Castle in Preston, Lancashire, Berwick had a life that hardly resembled his ancestor's glory and wealth. After working his period of servitude, he traveled southwards to the Province of South Carolina, where he received a grant of over 100 acres of land in what is now Saluda County, South Carolina. A year later, he married Anne Smallwood, and they lived out their lives there. They had four daughters and three sons, including Mark Travis and the Baptist missionary Alexander Travis.

Mark Travis married Jemima Stallworth on June 1, 1808. She gave birth to William Barret Travis on August 1, 1809. Records differ as to whether his date of birth was the first or the ninth of August, but his youngest brother, James C. Travis, who was in possession of the Travis family Bible at the time of his statement, indicated that William was born on the first. Mark and Jemima had nine other children over the next twenty years.

Travis's uncle Alexander migrated to the new territory of Alabama following the War of 1812, settling in modern-day Conecuh County. He urged his brother and family to come join him, where he said that the land was cheap and easy to acquire, so Mark took his family, including young William, then age 9, to Alabama. They settled in the newly forming town of Sparta, where Mark Travis purchased the very first certificate from the Sparta Land company. Young Travis grew up in Sparta, and while his father tended to the farming, his uncle Alexander became prominent, organizing the Old Beulah Church (among other churches), preaching in neighboring counties and nearby Evergreen, Alabama, and leaving a strong influence on young Travis.

During that same time, Alexander also founded the Sparta Academy and served as its superintendent. Travis received his first formal education at the Sparta Academy, studying subjects ranging from Greek and Latin to history and mathematics. After a few years, Travis moved to the academy of Professor William H. McCurdy in Claiborne, Alabama.

After completing his education at the age of 18, Travis gained a position as an assistant teacher in Monroe County, a position he held for less than a year. He began a romantic relationship with a student named Rosanna Cato.

== Life in Claiborne, ensuing debt and troubles ==
Eager to get away from farm life, Travis made his move to Claiborne permanent where he began studying law. Famed lawyer James Dellet accepted Travis as his apprentice. At that time, Claiborne was a major city in Alabama that was right next to the Alabama River, where trade and social life seemed to be miles ahead of the still-growing community of Sparta.

=== Mounting debt and failure ===
Travis and Cato married on October 26, 1828. Cato gave birth to their first son, Charlie, a year later, though there is evidence to support that Charlie was born out of wedlock or possibly even a year beforehand.

While still studying law under Dellet, Travis was eager to resume his professional career and to join the high ranks of Claiborne society. Travis started a newspaper, the Claiborne Herald, which, like many other newspapers of the day, published stories ranging from activities in Congress to stories of adventures across the world, local notices, advertisements and more. Travis essentially operated the newspaper himself, and while it provided a modest income during the first few months of operation, it was hardly enough to support himself, Rosanna and young Charlie. The financial stress led to carelessness at the Herald: advertisements were accidentally printed upside down, the type was not set properly in the printing press, letting words fall out of line, and advertisements that had expired were still published. He struggled to continue the paper, and though he asked for help, he received none.

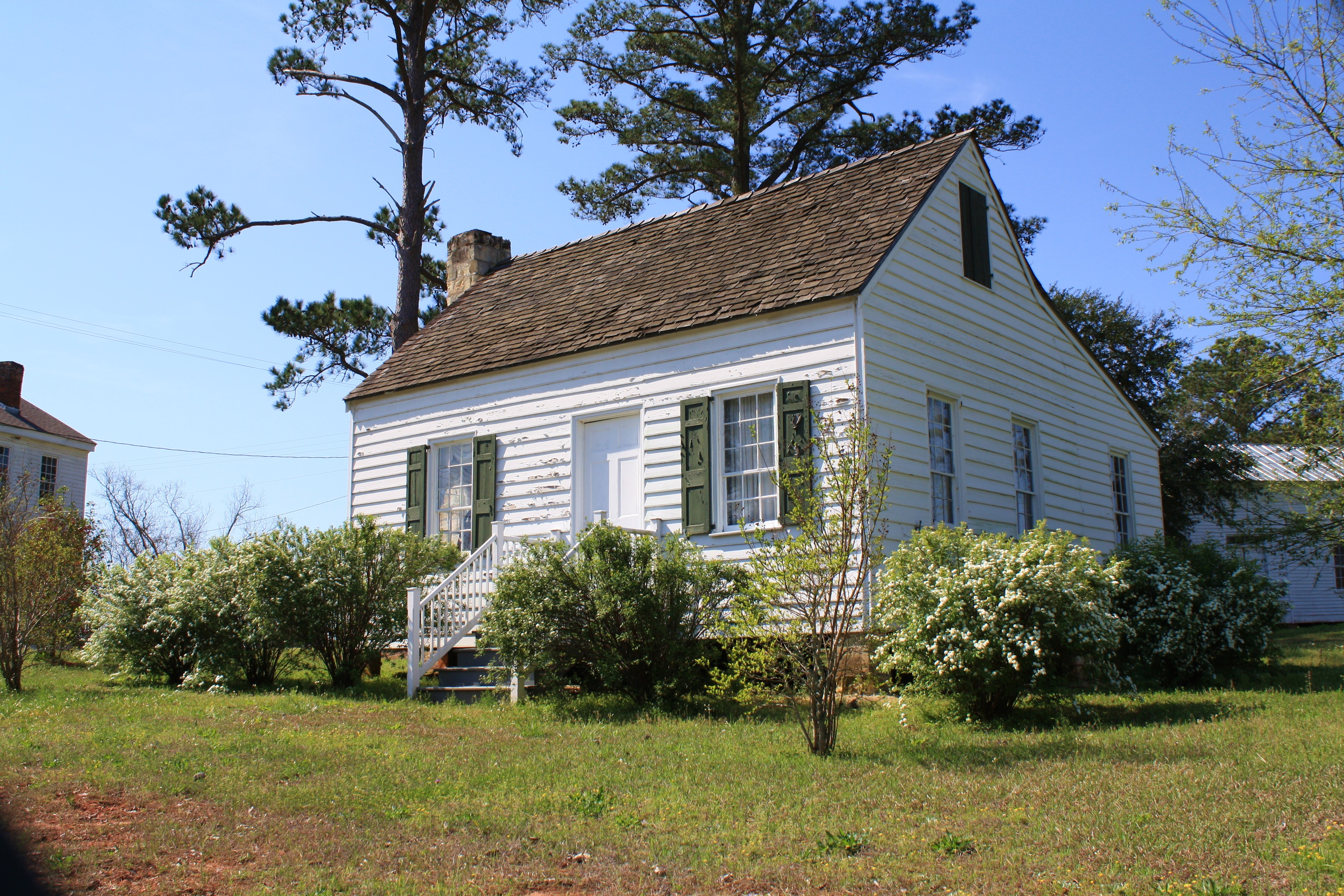
The home of Travis and Rosanna, relocated to Perdue Hill, Alabama, and restored in 1985

On February 27, 1829, Travis passed his law examination and received permission to legally practice, so he borrowed $55.37 (~$1,674 in 2025) to open a law office, as well as $90 earlier in the year to help pay for the Herald. Now in debt and with no practical income, he took in three boarding students, and to help Rosanna with the workload, he purchased two slaves. Maintaining the slaves increased his expenses, pushing Travis further into debt.

In 1829, the Herald's editions declined; only six issues were published in the fall when it was intended to be a weekly publication. It went from a newspaper to a two-sided sheet. Still, no one helped Travis with his newspaper, and by the end of that year, the Herald stopped being printed.

With hardly any law business coming in, the debts continued to mount. The earlier loans had never been paid, and more came - $192.40 in May 1829, $50.12 in June, and $50.00 in July. His law practice failed to attract any significant clients because men like Dellet continued to be trusted more than Travis. By the end of his law practice in Claiborne, he had had only six cases, and had received less than a total of $4.00. By the spring of 1831, his debt was $834 (~$25,215 in 2025).

Dellet, along with others to whom Travis owed money, had no choice but to file suit for Travis's debts to be repaid. At one point during the suit, Travis filed a plea that the case be dismissed on the grounds of infancy (he was still considered a minor in many parts of Alabama). Dellet responded by forcing Travis to stand, yelling at the courtroom "Gentlemen, I make 'proofest' of this infant!". Travis stood humiliated in a courtroom filled with people who were roaring with laughter, and the Court's clerk issued orders for his arrest on March 31, 1831.

At some point during his time in Claiborne, Travis heard stories of Texas, which was then an outlying state in the First Mexican Republic. In Texas, there was a massive amount of land speculation and immigration, with settlers coming in from the United States and Europe. There was also a strong demand for lawyers to deal with the influx of immigrants and land dealings, so he quickly made the decision to go to Texas. He promised Rosanna (now pregnant with a second child) that, while in Texas, he would earn enough money to pay back all of his debts. Rosanna trusted him to eventually return or send for her and his children. He did neither. Travis avoided arrest and left for Texas.

== Texas and the Anahuac disturbances ==
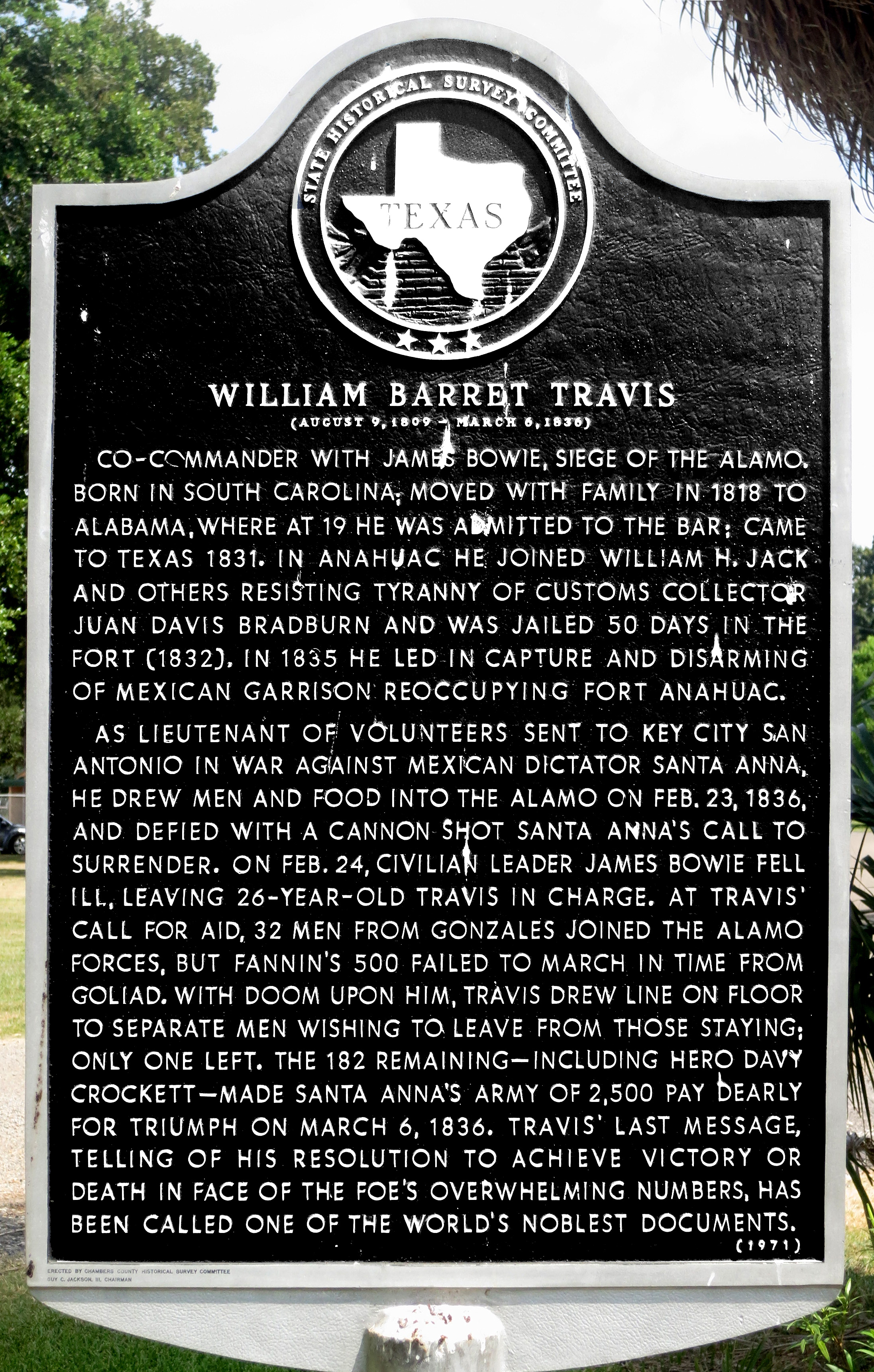
William Barret Travis Historical Marker in Anahuac, Texas

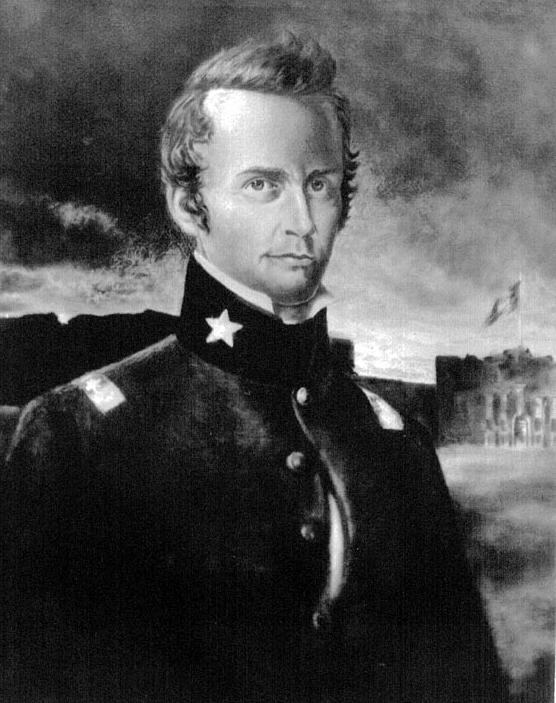
William B. Travis, painted by Henry Arthur McArdle, years after Travis's death, using a stand-in as a model.

In May 1831, upon his arrival in Mexican Texas, a part of northern Mexico at the time, Travis purchased land from Stephen F. Austin, who appointed him counsel from the United States.

He set up a law practice in Anahuac and helped start a militia to oppose Mexican rule. He subsequently became a pivotal figure in the Anahuac Disturbances.

The Anahuac disturbances were conflicts that came shortly before the Texas Revolution and were the result of tensions between the Mexican government and Texian militias.

The first disturbance in 1832 was triggered by a dispute around the ownership of escaped slaves that the Mexican brigadier general Juan Davis Bradburn was keeping safe in his compound in Galveston, as well as Bradburn's suspicions around the militia that Travis was part of. In 1832, the slaveowner hired Travis to represent him and try to get the slaves back. He was arrested twice by Bradburn, including for suspicion of sending a threatening letter to Bradburn. Bradburn himself was convinced that Travis was part of a plot to revolt against Mexican rule. When an Anglo-Texian militia came to free Travis, he encouraged them to attack the Mexicans during the negotiation, despite Bradburn threatening to shoot Travis if the militia attacked. While Travis was freed in the negotiation, there was a short conflict that led to six deaths and the Turtle Bayou Resolutions.

A second dispute arose on June 27, 1835, when tensions escalated following anti-tax protests by the Texians, and the organization of a group known as the Citizens of Texas.

Two men of the group, Briscoe and Harris, organized a stunt to test the tax laws and were arrested by Mexican commander Capt. Antonio Tenorio. The soldiers escorting Harris and Briscoe shot and wounded another Texian, young William Smith.

When news of the arrests was heard in San Felipe de Austin, political chief Peter Miller authorized Travis to gather a Texian Militia for a response. Travis commandeered a vessel at Harrisburg, and sailed for Anahuac. His 25-man force quickly gained surrender of the more than 40 Mexican troops. After disarming them, Travis and the company freed the Texians and expelled the Mexican troops.

Because Travis had acted without broad community support, he apologized to avoid endangering Stephen F. Austin who was in Mexico City at the time. Later that summer, Mexican military authorities demanded the surrender of Travis for military trial, but the colonists opposed this.

== The Texas Revolution and the Alamo ==
Travis was commissioned as a lieutenant colonel of the Legion of Cavalry and became the chief recruiting officer for a new regular Texian army. Governor Henry Smith ordered Travis to raise a company of professional soldiers to reinforce the Texians who were then under the command of James C. Neill at the Alamo Mission in San Antonio. Travis considered disobeying his orders, writing to Smith: "I am willing, nay anxious, to go to the defense of Bexar, but sir, I am unwilling to risk my reputation ... by going off into the enemy's country with such little means, so few men, and with them so badly equipped." James Bowie arrived at the Alamo with 30 men on January 19, 1836. On February 3, Travis arrived in San Antonio with eighteen regulars as reinforcements. A compromise was reached between Bowie and Travis for command of the Alamo, with Bowie in command of the volunteers and Travis in command of the regulars. When Bowie's health began to fail the compromise became irrelevant, and Travis became the official commander of the Alamo garrison. On March 6, 1836, following a thirteen-day siege, Santa Anna ordered the assault on the Alamo during the predawn hours. Travis died fighting to the end, and his remains were burned along with all the other Alamo defenders.

== Travis's "Victory or Death" letter from the Alamo ==
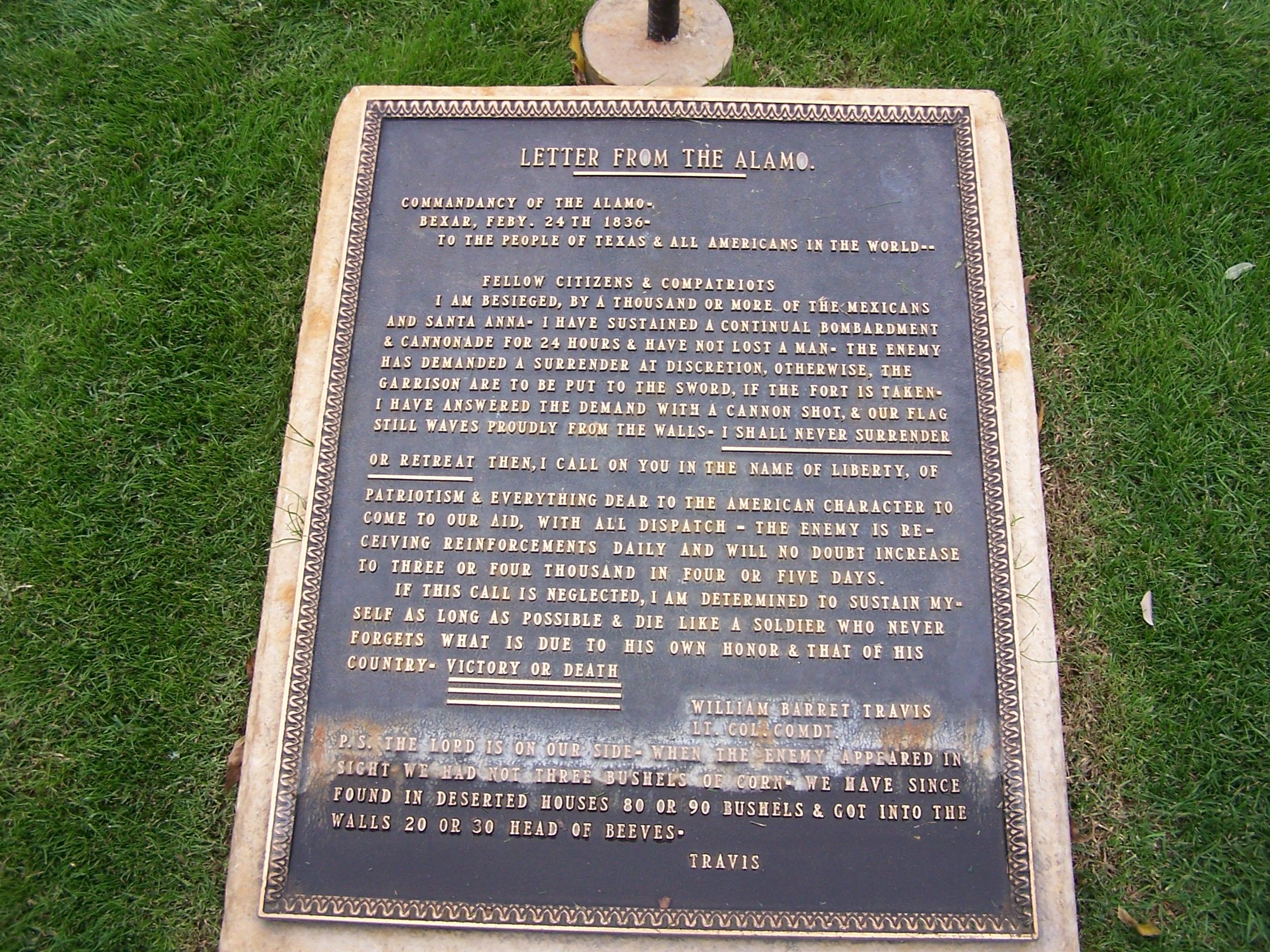
Plaque with the contents of the letter in front of the Alamo

On February 24, 1836, during Santa Anna's siege of the Alamo, Travis wrote a letter addressed "To the People of Texas and All Americans in the World":

Fellow citizens and compatriots;
I am besieged, by a thousand or more of the Mexicans under Santa Anna. I have sustained a continual Bombardment and cannonade for 24 hours and have not lost a man. The enemy has demanded a surrender at discretion, otherwise, the garrison are to be put to the sword, if the fort is taken. I have answered the demand with a cannon shot, and our flag still waves proudly from the walls. I shall never surrender or retreat. Then, I call on you in the name of Liberty, of patriotism and everything dear to the American character, to come to our aid, with all dispatch. The enemy is receiving reinforcements daily and will no doubt increase to three or four thousand in four or five days. If this call is neglected, I am determined to sustain myself as long as possible and die like a soldier who never forgets what is due to his own honor and that of his country. VICTORY or DEATH.
William Barret Travis
Lt. Col. Comdt.
P.S. The Lord is on our side. When the enemy appeared in sight we had not three bushels of corn. We have since found in deserted houses 80 or 90 bushels and got into the walls 20 or 30 head of Beeves.
Travis

He gave this letter to courier Albert Martin to deliver. The envelope that contained the letter was labeled "VICTORY or DEATH". The letter, while unable to bring aid to the garrison at the Alamo, did much to motivate the Texian army and helped to rally support in America for the cause of Texas independence. It also cemented Travis's status as a hero of the Texas Revolution.

== Alleged burial ==
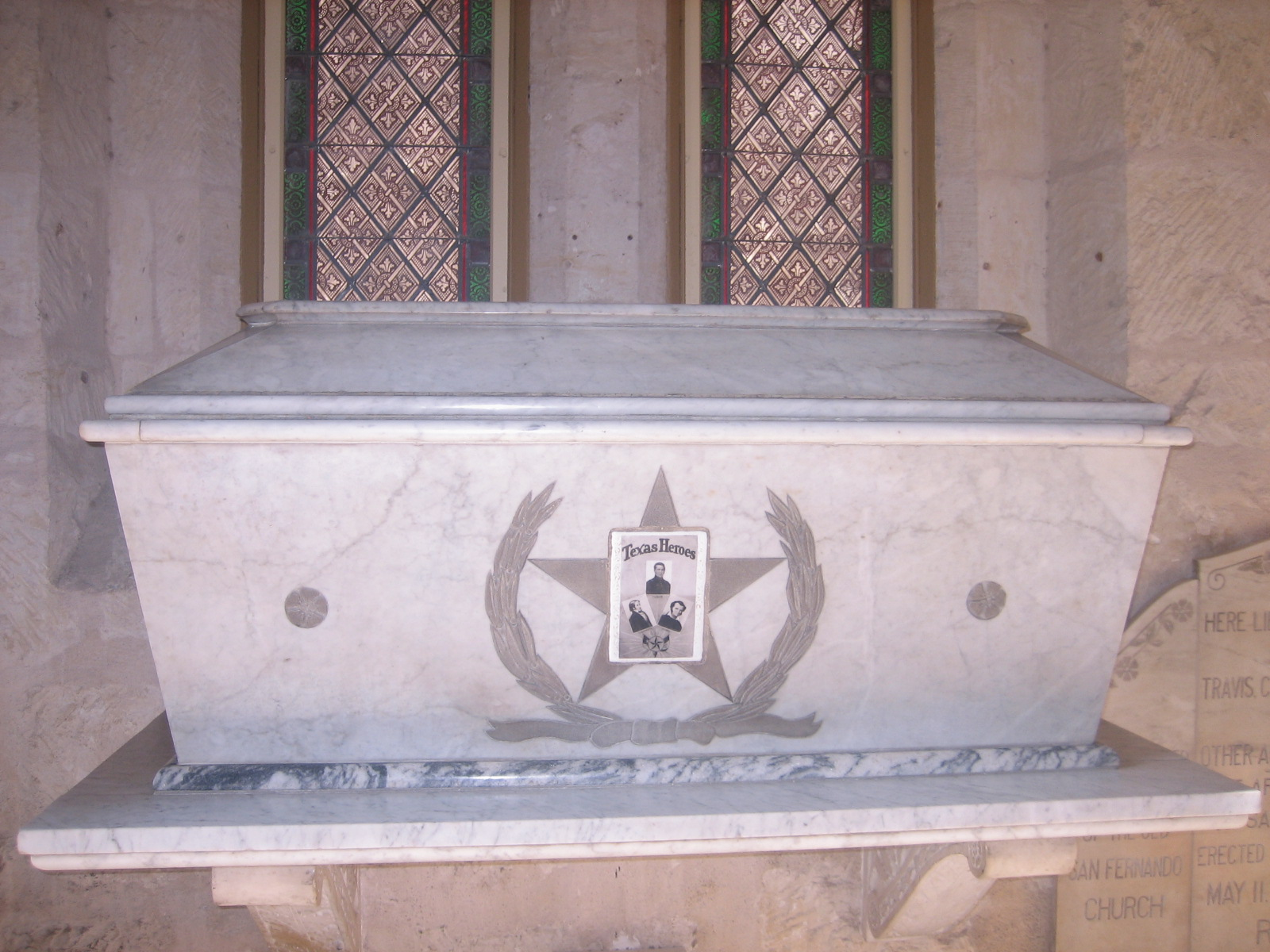
Cathedral of San Fernando sarcophagus with images of Travis, Bowie and Crockett

A year after the battle, acting upon orders from General Felix Huston, Colonel Juan Seguín oversaw the reclamation of the abandoned ashes of the Alamo defenders from three sites. On March 28, 1837, an official public ceremony was conducted to give a Christian burial to the ashes. It was believed they were buried in the vicinity of the Alamo, but their exact location was forgotten over time. When San Antonio's Cathedral of San Fernando was being renovated for a new altar during the Texas 1936 centennial, human remains believed to be those of the Alamo defenders were found. Because of discrepancies in various accounts in the ensuing century after the burial, public opinion was divided about whether or not these were the remains of the defenders. The recovered ashes were re-interred in a marble sarcophagus inside the cathedral, purportedly containing the bones of Travis, Crockett and Bowie, as well as others. Calls for DNA testing have not been acted upon.

== Family ==
Travis married one of his former students, 16-year-old Rosanna Cato (1812–1848), on October 26, 1828. The couple stayed in Claiborne and had a son, Charles Edward, in 1829 and a daughter, Susan, in 1831. They were officially divorced by the Marion County courts on January 9, 1836, by Act no. 115. Rosanna married Samuel G. Cloud in Monroeville, Alabama, on February 14, 1836. They both died of yellow fever during an epidemic which afflicted the state in 1848.

Charles Edward Travis (1829–1860) was raised by his mother and her second husband. He won a seat in the Texas legislature in 1853. In 1855, he enlisted in the United States Army as a captain in a cavalry regiment (which was later renamed the 5th Cavalry Regiment (United States) commanded by Albert Sidney Johnston) but was discharged in May 1856 for "conduct unbecoming an officer and a gentleman," following an allegation that he had cheated at cards. He appealed the decision to no avail. He then turned to studying law, earning a degree from Baylor University in 1859. He died of consumption (tuberculosis) within a year and is buried in the Masonic Cemetery.

Susan Isabella Travis (1831–1868) was born after Travis had departed for Texas. Although her paternity has been questioned, Travis did name her as his daughter in his will. She married a planter from Chappell Hill, Texas. Their son, who died young, was William Barret Grissett, and their daughter was Mary Jane Grissett Davidson DeCaussey.

== Legacy ==
- Twelve elementary schools
- 1836, Fort Travis
- 1840, Travis County
- 1870, Travis Park
- 1891, Heroes of the Alamo Monument
- 1936, Cenotaph by Pompeo Coppini
- 1936, William B. Travis, Hall of Heroes at the Hall of State, by Pompeo Coppini
- 1942, Lake Travis
- 1953, Travis Early College High School
- 1956, Travis Science Academy, Temple
- 1971, William Barret Travis, THC Historical Marker #9135, Fort Anahuac Park
- 1985, William B. Travis Building, Austin
- 2003, “Victory or Death”, Statues of Heroes at The Alamo, by Glenna Goodacre
- 2006, William B. Travis High School
- 2007, “The Line”, Collin County Courthouse, by James N. Muir
- 2019, William B. Travis Heritage Trail

== See also ==
- Timeline of the Texas Revolution

== General and cited references ==
- Davis, Robert E. (1966). The Diary of William Barret Travis. Waco, Tx: Texian Press. OCLC 732686506.
- Davis, William C. (1998). Three Roads to the Alamo. New York, NY: HarperCollins World. ISBN 978-0-06-017334-0.
- Hardin, Stephen L. (1994). Texian Iliad. Austin, TX: University of Texas Press. ISBN 978-0-292-73086-1.
