= Texians =

Texans of white American descent

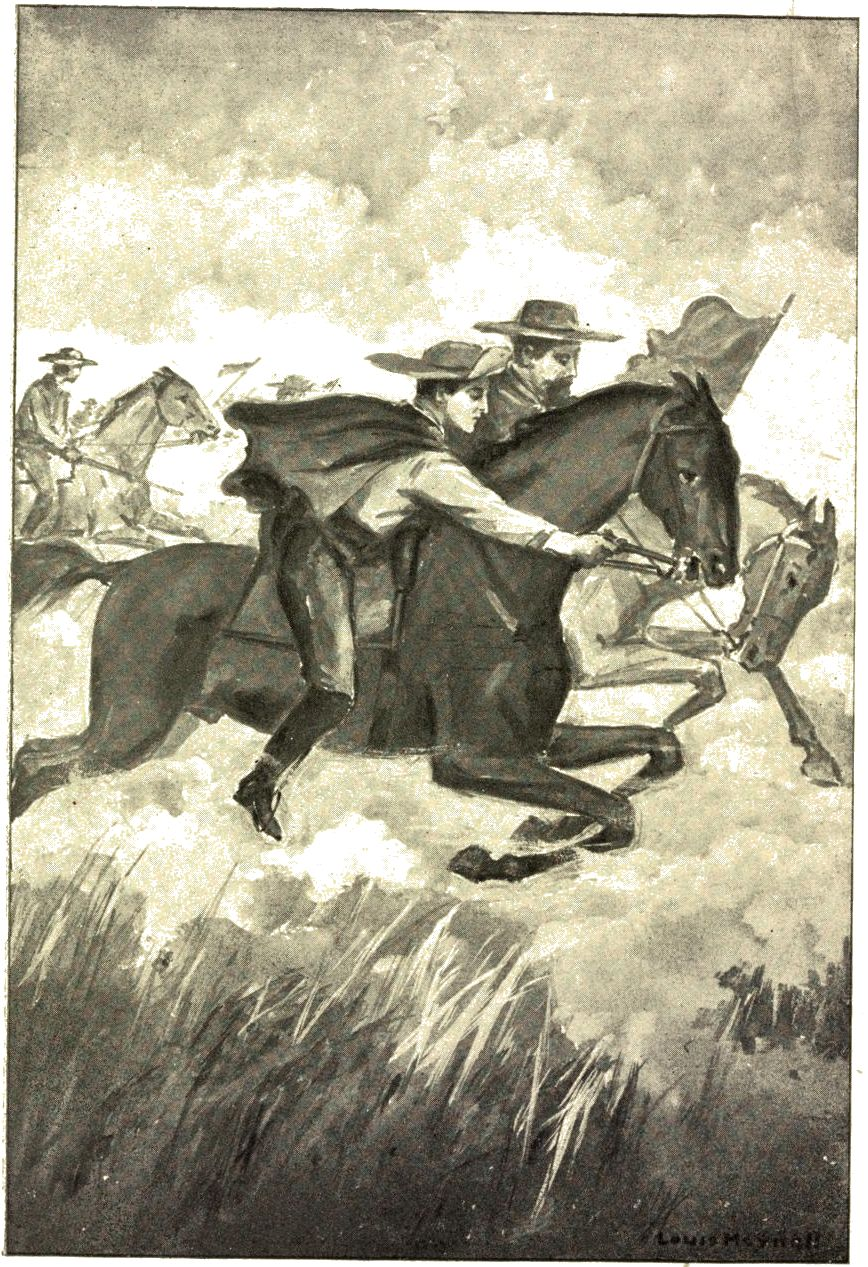
A series of illustrations from the 19th-century book For the Liberty of Texas, depicting scenes from the Texas Revolution.

Texians were Anglo-American immigrants to Mexican Texas and, later, citizens of the Republic of Texas. Today, the term is used to identify early Anglo settlers of Texas, especially those who supported the Texas Revolution. Mexican settlers of that era are referred to as Tejanos, and American citizens of the modern State of Texas regardless of race and ethnicity are referred to as Texans.

== History ==
=== Colonial settlement ===
Many different settler groups came to Texas over the centuries. Spanish colonists in the 17th century linked Texas to the rest of New Spain. French and English traders and settlers arrived in the 18th century, and more numerous German, Dutch, Swedish, Irish, Scottish, Scots-Irish, and Welsh settled in the years leading up to Texas independence in 1836.

Between 1834 and 1836, the Texian Army was organized to fight for Texas' independence from Mexico, which had itself gained independence from Spain in 1821. Although the Texian army was predominantly made up of Anglo-Americans who traced their ancestries to Colonial America, it was a diverse group of people from many different nations and states. The Texian Army was composed of Tejano volunteers, volunteers from the Southern United States; and immigrants directly from Europe including countries like England, Germany, the Netherlands, Sweden, Ireland, Scotland, Wales, Portugal, and what is now the Czech Republic. Used in this sense, terms like "Texian Army", "Texian forces", or "Texian troops" would refer to any of the inhabitants of Texas, in that era, who participated in the Texas Revolution.

=== Republic of Texas ===
Texian was a popular demonym, used by Texas colonists, for all the people of the Republic of Texas (1836–1846), before it became a U.S. state. This term was used by early colonists and public officials, including many Texas residents, and President Mirabeau Lamar frequently used it to foster Texas nationalism.

Over time, language shifted to "Texan" instead of "Texian". Texan became the standard term after Texas joined the United States.

The Texas Almanac of 1857 bemoaned the shift in usage, saying

"Texian...has more euphony, and is better adapted to the conscience of poets who shall hereafter celebrate our deeds in sonorous strains than the harsh, abrupt, ungainly, appellation, Texan—impossible to rhyme with anything but the merest doggerel."

The Almanac continued to use the earlier term until 1868. Many who had lived through the times of Revolution and Republic continued to call themselves Texians into the 20th century.

=== Cultural identity ===
Texians developed a unique cultural identity rooted in their Anglo-American background and shaped by their experience living under Mexican rule. Most came from the southern United States, bringing with them English, Protestant religious traditions, and customs like private land ownership and a strong belief in personal independence.

Though they lived in Mexican Texas, many Texians resisted adopting Mexican cultural norms such as Catholicism and the Spanish language, often leading to tensions with the Mexican government.

Over time, the Texians began to see themselves as a separate group than from where they originated, with their own values and identity. Their focus on liberty, local control, and property rights helped fuel support for the Texas Revolution. After independence, Texians embraced national symbols like the Lone Star and used revolutionary anniversaries to strengthen a shared sense of pride and distinctiveness from both Mexico and the United States.

=== Military involvement ===
A photograph of the Gonzales Battle Memorial, commemorating the early skirmish that marked the beginning of the Texas Revolution.

Texians played a central role in the military campaigns that defined the Texas Revolution. As tensions with the Mexican government escalated, Anglo-American settlers and allied Tejanos formed militias and volunteer companies to resist centralist policies under President Antonio López de Santa Anna.

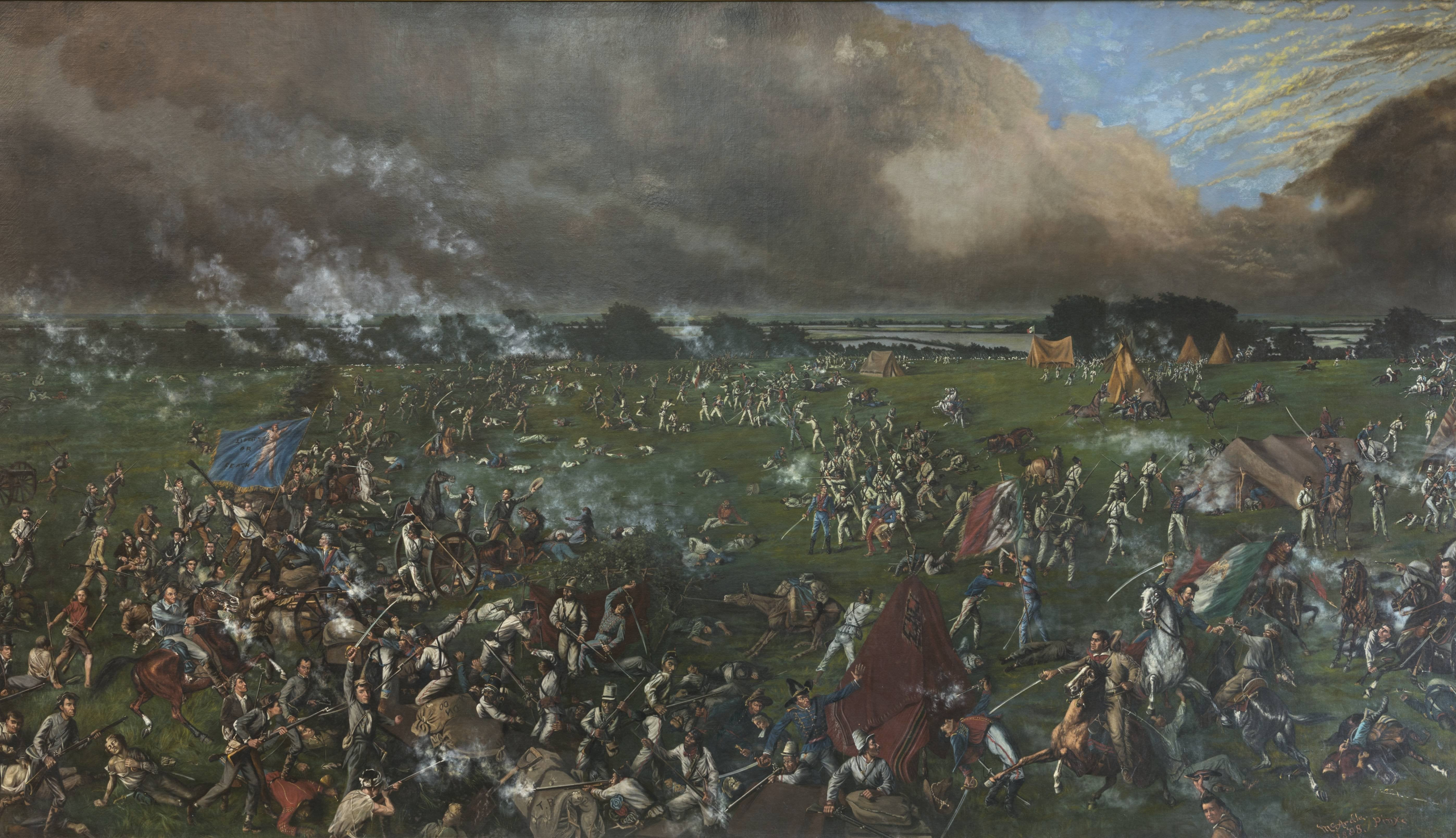
The Battle of San Jacinto, where Texian forces secured their independence from Mexico.

The Texian Army, made up of volunteers from Texas and the United States, was crucial in battles such as the Siege of Bexar (1835), the Battle of the Alamo (1836), and the decisive Battle of San Jacinto. While early militia units were loosely organized, the army eventually came under more formal command, most notably led by Sam Houston, who would later become president of the Republic of Texas.

In addition to the land forces, the Texian Navy was established to defend the coast and disrupt Mexican supply lines, patrolling the Gulf of Mexico and engaging Mexican vessels.

Military service became a key aspect of Texian identity. Volunteers from the United States and immigrants from Europe joined the Texian cause, often motivated by land grants and the promise of political freedom.

=== Notable Texians ===
Several prominent figures from the Texas Revolution and the Republic of Texas era were referred to as Texians. These individuals played critical roles in Texas' independence and formation as a republic.

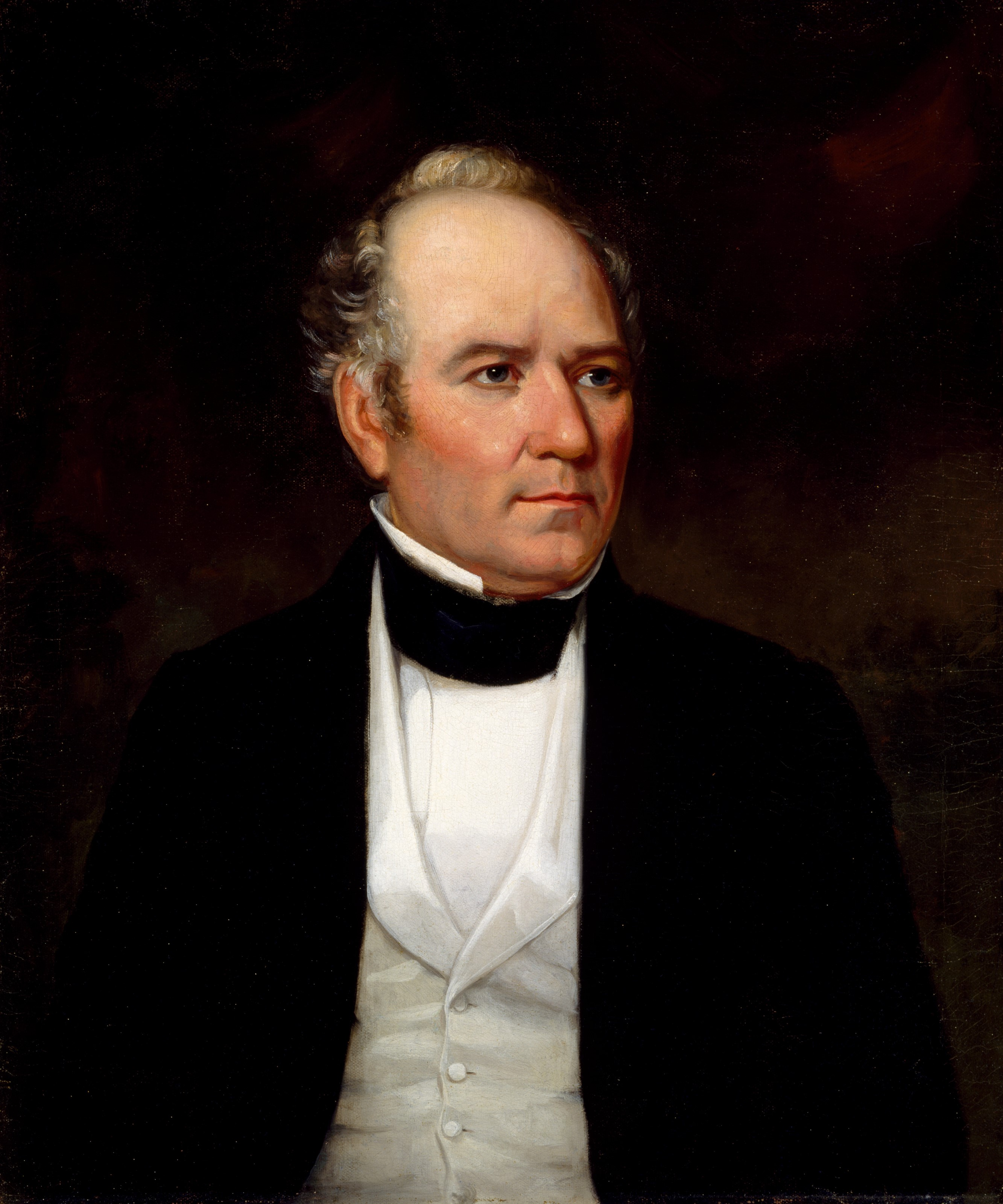
- Sam Houston, leader of the Texian Army during the Texas Revolution, played a pivotal role in securing Texas' independence from Mexico.
  Sam Houston – A former governor of Tennessee, Houston became the commander of the Texian Army during the Texas Revolution. He led Texian forces to victory at the Battle of San Jacinto in 1836, securing Texas' independence. He later served as the first elected president of the Republic of Texas.
- Stephen F. Austin – Often called the "Father of Texas," Austin was responsible for leading the first large wave of American settlers into Mexican Texas. Though initially a supporter of cooperation with Mexico, he later became an advocate for Texian self-rule.
- William B. Travis – Best known for his leadership at the Battle of the Alamo, Travis became a symbol of Texian resistance. His famous letter calling for reinforcements remains one of the most iconic documents of the Texas Revolution.
- Edward Burleson – A veteran of several key battles, including San Jacinto, Burleson served as vice president of the Republic of Texas and briefly commanded Texian forces. He was also an early Texas legislator.

== See also ==
- Texian Government
- Texican
- Bibliography of the Texas Revolution, Republic, and Annexation
