= List of Texian survivors of the Battle of the Alamo =

When the Battle of the Alamo ended at approximately 6:30 a.m. on March 6, 1836, fewer than fifty of the around 260 Texians who had occupied the Alamo Mission in San Antonio, Texas, were alive. The conflict, a part of the Texas Revolution, was the first step in Mexican President Antonio López de Santa Anna's attempt to retake the province of Texas after an insurgent army of Texian settlers, native "Tejanos", and adventurers from the United States had driven out all Mexican troops the previous year.

Santa Anna led an army to San Antonio de Bexar, arriving on February 23, 1836, and immediately initiating a siege of the Alamo, which housed Texian Army troops. As the Mexican Army had approached San Antonio, several of the Alamo defenders brought their families into the Alamo to keep them safe. During the twelve days of the siege, Alamo co-commander William Barret Travis sent multiple couriers to the acting Texas government, the remaining Texas army under James Fannin, and various Texas communities, asking for reinforcements, provisions, and ammunition.

The siege culminated in an early-morning assault by Mexican troops which left almost all of the defenders dead. Some reports claimed that several Texians surrendered but were quickly executed on Santa Anna's orders. Of the Texians who fought during the battle, only two survived: Travis's slave, Joe, who was assumed by the Mexican soldiers to be a noncombatant; and Brigido Guerrero, who had deserted from the Mexican Army several months before, and convinced the Mexican soldiers that he had been taken prisoner by the Texians. Alamo co-commander James Bowie's freedman, Sam, was also spared, although it is not known if he participated in the fighting.

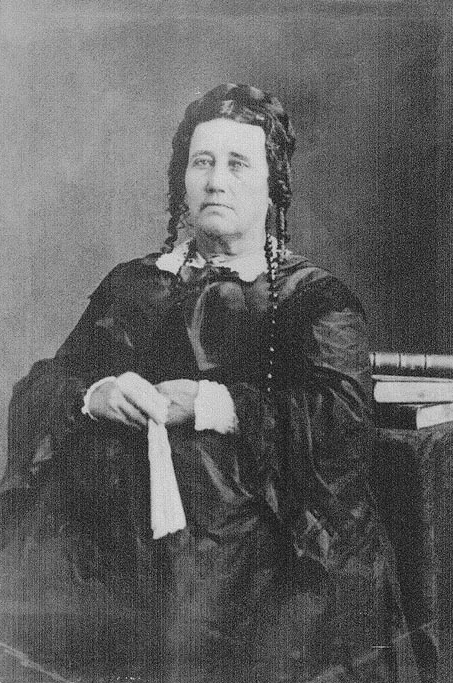
Susanna Dickinson

During the battle, most of the women and children had gathered in the sacristy of the church. As Mexican soldiers entered the room, a boy, thought to be the son of defender Anthony Wolf, stood up to rearrange a blanket around his shoulders. Mistaking him for a Texian soldier, the Mexican soldiers bayoneted him. In the confusion, at least one of the women was lightly wounded. Bowie's family, including Gertrudis Navarro, Juana Navarro Alsbury and her son, were hiding in one of the rooms along the west wall. Navarro opened the door to their room to signal that they meant no harm. A Mexican officer soon arrived and led the women to a spot along one of the walls where they would be relatively safe. All of the women and children were eventually placed under the protection of an officer and escorted out of the Alamo and imprisoned in the home of the Musquiz family.

On March 7, Santa Anna interviewed each of the survivors individually. He was impressed with Susanna Dickinson, the young widow of Alamo artillery captain Almaron Dickinson, and offered to adopt her infant daughter Angelina Dickinson and have the child educated in Mexico City. Susanna Dickinson refused the offer, which was not extended to Juana Navarro Alsbury for her son who was of similar age.

Santa Anna ordered that the Tejano civilian survivors be allowed to return to their homes in San Antonio. Dickinson and Joe were allowed to travel towards the Anglo settlements, escorted by Ben, a former slave from the United States who served as Mexican Colonel Juan Almonte's cook. Each woman was given $2 and a blanket and was allowed to go free and spread the news of the destruction that awaited those who opposed the Mexican government. Before releasing Joe, Santa Anna ordered that the surviving members of the Mexican Army parade in a grand review, in the hopes that Joe and Dickinson would deliver a warning to the remainder of the Texian forces that his army was unbeatable.

When the small party of survivors arrived in Gonzales on March 13 they found Sam Houston, the commander of all Texian forces, waiting there with about 400 men. After Dickinson and Joe related the details of the battle and the strength of Santa Anna's army, Houston advised all civilians to evacuate and then ordered the army to retreat. This was the beginning of the Runaway Scrape, in which much of the population of Texas, including the acting government, rushed to the East to escape the advancing Mexican Army.

== List of survivors ==
Name	Status in the Alamo	Birth–Death	Notes
James L. Allen	Soldier	1815–1901	Allen left the Alamo on March 5. He was the last courier to leave.
Maria Andrea Castanon Villanueva	Civilian noncombatant	1803–1899	Some doubt on her presence at the Alamo.
Horace Alsbury	Soldier	1805–1847	When Mexican troops arrived on February 23, Travis sent Alsbury as the first courier. His wife Juana was inside the fortress and later provided John Salmon Ford with her account of the battle.
Juana Navarro Alsbury	Civilian noncombatant	1808–1888	Alsbury entered the Alamo for protection at the invitation of her cousin-in-law James Bowie, after her husband, Horace Alsbury, was sent on a scouting mission for the Texian Army.
Jose Maria Arocha	Soldier	—	Juan Seguin's volunteers. (Note: Some Tejanos were part of the Bexar military garrison, but others were part of Seguin's volunteer scout company and were in the Alamo on or before Feb 23. Enrique Esparza, who was inside the fortress as the son of defender Gregorio Esparza, later recalled that Santa Anna offered a three-day amnesty to all Tejano defenders. According to Esparza, Tejanos discussed the matter with Bowie who advised them to take the amnesty. It is believed most of the Tejanos left when Seguin did, either as couriers or because of the amnesty. Poyo (1996), p. 53, 58 Efficient in the Cause (Stephen L. Harden); Lindley (2003), pp. 94, 134)
Simon Arreola	Soldier	—	Juan Seguin's volunteers.
Jesse B. Badgett	—	1807–1858	He and Samuel A. Maverick were elected February 5 to represent the garrison at the Convention of 1836 which convened March 1 at Washington-on-the-Brazos.
Andrew Barcena	Soldier	–	Also known as Andres Barcinas, he and Anselmo Bergara had been part of Seguín's company. They were the first witnesses of the Alamo's fall to arrive in Houston's camp at Gonzales on March 11. Houston denounced them as Mexican spies and had them arrested, but Barcena fought under Seguín at the Battle of San Jacinto.
Samuel G. Bastain	—	—	Bastain left February 29 as a courier to reiterate urgency to Gonzales reinforcements, whom he joined en route. On the return trip, they were unable to enter the Alamo.
John Walker Baylor, Jr.	Soldier	1813–1836	According to his family, Baylor left the Alamo as a courier, probably February 25. He died of complications from wounds suffered at the Battle of San Jacinto.
Anselmo Bergara	Soldier	1778–	He and Andrew Barcena had been part of Seguín's company. Bergara And Barcena are said to have been sent to warn Houston of the impending Alamo's fall. Arrived in Houston's camp at Gonzales on March 11. Bergara later fought under Seguín as part of his cavalry troop.
Bettie	Civilian noncombatant	–	Bettie was a black cook for the garrison. When Mexican troops entered the kitchens, Charlie grabbed a young Mexican officer and threatened to kill him unless the soldiers spared his life and Bettie's. Thomas Ricks Lindley speculated that Bettie was a servant in the Veramendi home, where James Bowie, Juana Navarro Alsbury and Gertrudis Navarro lived.
Robert Brown	Soldier	~1818–	Brown left as a courier after February 25.
Cesario Carmona	Soldier	—	Juan Seguin's volunteers.
María de Jesús Castro also known as María de Jesús Esparza	Civilian noncombatant	1826–1899	Castro was the stepdaughter of defender Gregorio Esparza.
Charlie	Slave	–	When Mexican troops entered the kitchens, Charlie grabbed a young Mexican officer and threatened to kill him unless the soldiers spared his life and Bettie's.
Antonio Cruz y Arocha	Soldier	–	On February 25, Cruz accompanied Juan Seguin to gather reinforcements.
Matias Curvier	Soldier	—	Juan Seguin's volunteers.
Alexandro De La Garza	Soldier	–	He left as a courier.
Francis L. Desauque	Soldier	?–1836	Desaque left Bexar to obtain provisions for the garrison about February 22. He died in the Goliad massacre.
Angelina Dickinson	Civilian noncombatant	1834–1869	Dickinson was the daughter of defender Almaron Dickinson and his wife Susanna Dickinson. After the battle, Mexican General Antonio López de Santa Anna offered to adopt her, but Susanna Dickinson refused to give up her child.
Susanna Dickinson	Civilian noncombatant	1814–1883	Dickinson was the wife of defender Almaron Dickinson. After the battle, Santa Anna sent Dickinson and William Barret Travis's slave Joe to Gonzales to warn the Texian colonists of the dangers of opposing Santa Anna.
Philip Dimmitt	Captain of a company of soldiers	1801–1841	Dimmitt left the Alamo on February 23 to gather reinforcements. He was captured by a Mexican raiding party in 1841 and committed suicide after being threatened with execution.
Lucio Enriques	Soldier	—	Juan Seguin's volunteers.
Ana Salazar Esparza	Civilian noncombatant	?–1847	Esparza was the wife of defender Gregorio Esparza, and the mother of Maria de Jesus Castro and Enrique, Francisco, and Manuel Esparza. After the battle she and her children were allowed to return to their home in San Antonio.
Enrique Esparza	Civilian noncombatant	1828–1917	Esparza was the son of defender Gregorio Esparza and Ana Salazar Esparza.
Francisco Esparza	Civilian noncombatant	1833–1887	Esparza was the son of defender Gregorio Esparza and Ana Salazar Esparza.
Manuel Esparza	Civilian noncombatant	1830–1886	Esparza was the son of defender Gregorio Esparza and Ana Salazar Esparza.
Manuel N. Flores	Soldier	1799–1867	Juan Seguin's volunteers.
Salvador Flores	Soldier	1806–1855	Flores left with Seguín on February 25. During the Runaway Scrape, he led a part of Seguín's company in guarding fleeing families.
Petra Gonzales	Civilian noncombatant	–	Gonzales may have been an elderly relative of Ana Salazar Esparza.
Ignacio Gurrea	Soldier	—	Juan Seguin's volunteers.
Brigido Guerrero	Soldier	~1810–	Guerrero had deserted the Mexican Army to join the Texians in December 1835. When he realized the Texians could not prevail at the Battle of the Alamo, he locked himself in a cell and convinced the Mexican Army that he was a prisoner of the Texians.
Pedro Herrera	Soldier	—	Juan Seguin's volunteers.
Benjamin Franklin Highsmith	Soldier	1817–1905	Left as a courier, probably just before the siege began. Although he attempted to return to the garrison on March 5, he was chased away by Mexican soldiers.
Joe	Slave of William B. Travis	1813/1815–	When the battle commenced, Joe fought alongside Travis. After Travis's death, Joe hid in the chapel. Mexican soldiers assumed him to be a noncombatant.
John Johnson	Soldier	1800	Dispatched as courier February 23.
William Johnson	Soldier	—	
Byrd Lockhart	Soldier	1782–1839	On February 23, Lockhart and Andrew Jackson Sowell were scouting for provisions when the Mexican Army arrived. Fearing that they would be unable to re-enter the Alamo, they went to Gonzales.
Concepcion Losoya	Civilian noncombatant	–	Losoya was either the sister or mother of Juana Melton, wife of Alamo quartermaster Eliel Melton, and possibly the mother of defender Toribio Losoya.
Juan Losoya	Civilian noncombatant		Losoya was the son of Concepcion Losoya.
Samuel Maverick	Soldier and delegate	1803–1870	Elected a delegate from the Alamo garrison on Feb. 1 to the March independence convention, left the Alamo garrison on March 2.
Juana Melton	Civilian noncombatant		Melton was the wife of Alamo quartermaster Eliel Melton, and either the sister or daughter of Concepcion Losoya.
Antonio Menchaca	Soldier	1800–1879	Juan Seguin's volunteers.
Gerald Navan	Soldier	—	Dispatched as courier March 3.
Gertrudis Navarro	Civilian noncombatant	1816–1895	Navarro was the sister of Juana Navarro Alsbury. She entered the Alamo for protection at the invitation of her cousin-in-law James Bowie.
Benjamin F. Nobles	Soldier	–	Nobles left the Alamo with Dimitt on February 23.
William Sanders Oury	Soldier	1817–1887	Oury left the Alamo as a courier on February 29.
Jose Sebastian de Jesus Pacheco "Luciano"	Soldier	1819–1898	"Luciano" was recognized for his service as a veteran of the Texas Revolution on February 27, 1875, in his Republic pension claim. An affidavit was signed by Juan Seguin on February 6, 1875, affirming that Luciano was indeed a member of Seguin's company and had entered the Alamo with Seguin himself and Jim Bowie. Luciano was sent by Seguin and William Travis to fetch a trunk from Seguin's rancho. Upon returning, he was unable to reenter the Alamo due to Mexican patrols. Luciano was one of the final three surviving veterans of the Alamo when he died in Graytown, Texas, on August 25, 1898.
William Hester Patton	Captain of a company of soldiers	1808–	Patton left the Alamo, likely as a courier.
Alijo Perez Jr.	Civilian noncombatant	1835–1918	Perez entered the Alamo with his mother, Juana Navarro Alsbury. Perez was probably the last living survivor of the Alamo.
Eduardo Ramirez	Soldier	—	Juan Seguin's volunteers.
Ambrosio Rodriguez	Soldier	—	Juan Seguin's volunteers.
Victoriana de Salina and three children	Civilian noncombatant	–	Three daughters accompanied her into the Alamo. Their names and ages are unknown.
Moses Rose	Soldier	1780s [?]— 1850/1851[?]	Allowed to leave the Alamo March 5, 1836
Sam	Slave of James Bowie	–	Sam was spared because he was a slave. Historian Walter Lord believed that Sam did not exist and that contemporaries actually meant Ben, a former slave who served as Mexican Colonel Juan Almonte's cook and later guided Susanna Dickinson from San Antonio. Thomas Ricks Lindley speculated that Sam was actually a servant at the Veramendi home, where James Bowie, Juana Navarro Alsbury, and Gertrudis Navarro lived.
Trinidad Saucedo	Civilian noncombatant	1809–	Saucedo may have accompanied Juana Navarro Alsbury into the Alamo. She left during a three-day armistice.
Juan Seguin	Captain of a cavalry company	1806–1890	Seguin left on February 25 to recruit reinforcements. After encountering a Mexican patrol he pretended to be an officer in the Mexican Army. When he neared the soldiers he spurred his horse and used his knowledge of the terrain to escape.
Silvero	Soldier	—	Juan Seguin's volunteers.
John William Smith	Scout	1792–1845	Smith first left the Alamo on February 23 with one of Travis's first pleas for help. On March 1 he guided the 32 reinforcements from Gonzales into the Alamo, and left again on March 3 with another message from Travis. He was returning to San Antonio with 25 reinforcements when the Alamo fell.
Launcelot Smither	Soldier	1800–1842	Left on February 23, possibly as an official courier. He was later killed by members of Mexican General Adrián Woll's force.
Andrew Jackson Sowell	Soldier	1815–1883	On February 23, Sowell and Boyd Lockhart were scouting for provisions when the Mexican Army arrived. Fearing that they would be unable to re-enter the Alamo, they went to Gonzales.
John Sutherland, Jr.	Soldier	1792–1867	Historians disagree on whether Sutherland was ever present at the Alamo. If he was, he left as a courier on February 23.
Henry Warnell	Soldier	1812–1836	Historians disagree on whether Warnell was at the Alamo. The historians who place Warnell in the Alamo believe Warnell either escaped during the battle on March 6 or that he left as a courier. Warnell died in Port Lavaca, Texas of wounds incurred either during the final battle or during his escape as a courier.
Vicente Zepeda	Soldier	—	Juan Seguin's volunteers.

== See also ==
- List of Alamo defenders

== See also ==
- Bibliography of the Texas Revolution, Republic, and Annexation
