= Susanna Dickinson =

American survivor of the Battle of the Alamo (1814–1883)

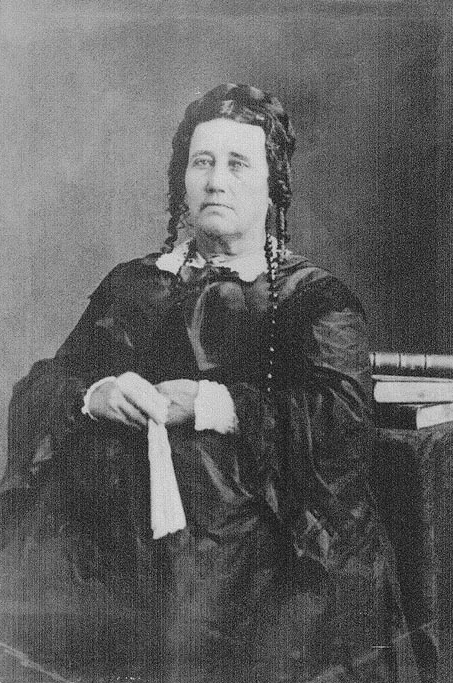
- Born: circa 1814; Tennessee
- Died: October 7, 1883; Austin, Texas, U.S.
- Resting place: Oakwood Cemetery (Austin, Texas)
- Spouses: Almaron Dickinson (m. 1829; died 1836); John Williams (m. 1837; div. 1837); Francis P. Herring (m. 1838; died 1843); Peter Belles (m. 1847; died 1857); Joseph W. Hannig (m. 1857)
- Children: Angelina Elizabeth Dickinson

Susanna Wilkerson Dickinson (c. 1814 – October 7, 1883) and her infant daughter, Angelina, were among the few survivors of the 1836 Battle of the Alamo during the Texas Revolution. Her husband, Almaron Dickinson, and 185 other Texian defenders were killed by the Mexican Army.

== Early life ==
Susanna was born c. 1814 in Williamson County, Tennessee. She married Almaron Dickinson on May 24, 1829, when she was 15 years old. After acquiring land along the San Marcos River, the couple became DeWitt Colonists two years later. The Dickinsons then constructed a blacksmith shop there and made investments in fellow colonist George Kimbell's Gonzales hat business.

== Texas Revolution ==
As the Mexican government increasingly abandoned its federalist structure in favor of a more centralized government, Almaron Dickinson became one of the early proponents of war. He would later join with other volunteers during the Battle of Gonzales, becoming one of the "Old Gonzales 18" in the battle which launched the Texas Revolution on October 2, 1835. By the end of the year, the Texian army had driven all Mexican soldiers from the territory. Soon after, Susanna joined Almaron at the former Alamo Mission in San Antonio de Bexar (now San Antonio, Texas) shortly after his assignment to the garrison there. The Dickinson family lived outside the Alamo, boarding with the Ruiz family.

In early 1836, Mexican President Antonio Lopez de Santa Anna led troops into Texas, which arrived in San Antonio on February 23 and immediately besieged the Alamo. It did not even have food stocked inside the mission to withstand the siege. The men thus quickly herded cattle into it and scrounged for food in the recently abandoned houses outside. Susanna and Angelina were among the families of garrison members who were brought inside for safety.

For the next twelve days, the Alamo lay under siege. Santa Anna planned an early morning assault for March 6. At 8:10 pm on March 5 the Mexican artillery ceased their bombardment. As Santa Anna had planned, the exhausted Texans soon fell into the first uninterrupted sleep many had had since the siege began. At 5:30 am Santa Anna gave the order to advance. As the Mexican soldiers began to yell and their buglers sounded, the Texan defenders awakened and rushed to their posts. Susanna, Angelina, and most other noncombatants gathered in the chapel sacristy for safety. She later mentioned that Davy Crockett stopped briefly to pray before taking his assigned position.

The Mexican soldiers soon breached the Alamo's outer walls. As previously planned, most of the Texians fell back to the barracks and the chapel. Almaron Dickinson briefly slipped from his post manning a cannon in the chapel to join Susanna in the sacristy. He yelled "Great God, Sue, the Mexicans are inside our walls! If they spare you, save my child!", then kissed her and returned to his cannon. It took an hour for the Mexican army to secure complete control of the Alamo. Among the last Texians to die were the 11 men, including Almaron, manning the two 12-pounder cannon in the chapel. The entrance had been barricaded with sandbags, which the Texans were able to fire over. However, a shot from the Mexican 18-pounder cannon destroyed the barricade, and Mexican soldiers entered after an initial musket volley. Although Dickinson's crew fired their cannon from the apse into the Mexican soldiers, they had no time to reload. Dickinson, Gregorio Esparza, Bonham, and the remaining Texians grabbed rifles and fired before being bayoneted to death. Texian Robert Evans, the master of ordnance, had been tasked with keeping the gunpowder from falling into Mexican hands. Wounded, he crawled towards the powder magazine but was killed by a musket ball with his torch only inches from the powder. If he had succeeded, the blast would have destroyed the chapel, killing Susanna and the other women and children hiding in it. As soldiers approached the sacristy, one of defender Anthony Wolf's sons stood to pull a blanket over his shoulders and was killed.

Another Texan was still alive. Jacob Walker, the gunner from Nacogdoches who had remained by his cannon as part of Jim Bonham’s and Capt. William Carey's artillery company. After there were no more balls left to fire, plugged his cannon with scraps of cast iron and broken pieces of chain and fired at the Mexican soldiers. A Mexican officer trained a force of muskets on them and they became major targets. Jacob Walker, who had remained by his cannon until his wounds kept him from firing his cannon, leaped from the ramp, and dashed to the side of Mrs. Dickinson in one of the chapel side rooms. He had made his way to the side of Mrs. Dickinson, perhaps in hopes that she would be spared to carry messages to his family. During the siege he had often talked with her about his wife and four children. His cousin Asa was also at the Alamo.

Asa Walker had come to Texas from Tennessee the year before. He was in a hurry, and had written his good friend, William Gant: “I take the responsibility of taking your overcoat and gun—your gun they would have anyhow & I might as well have it as anyone else. . . . If you can overtake me you can take your gun and I will trust to chance.” He concludes with an apology and signs himself “your friend at heart. A. WALKER.” Gant joined him and they made the trip to Texas together. F. C. Proctor, a lawyer led a lawsuit to try to recover land bounty remunerations for the heirs of PVT Asa Walker and stated that Asa was one of the last men killed in the Battle of the Alamo, firing his borrowed gun until there were no bullets, then swinging his gun similar as a club, and fighting with his hands, until there were 7 Mexican army men dead near his feet. Now Asa lay dead.

When the Mexicans found Jacob, he was beside Mrs. Dickinson, he begged her to take a message to his wife Anna, he then turned to face the Mexican hordes. Susanna Dickenson said the Mexican soldiers shot and bayoneted him to death as she looked on. The soldiers pitched him around on bayonets, as they would a bale of hay. Walker’s death may well have been the last one in the Alamo.

Another Texian, Brigido Guerrero, who had deserted from the Mexican Army in December 1835 also sought refuge in the sacristy, and was spared after convincing the soldiers he was a prisoner of the Texians. In the confusion, Susanna was lightly wounded.

On March 7, Santa Anna interviewed each of the survivors individually. Impressed with Susanna, he offered to adopt Angelina and have her educated in Mexico City. Susanna refused; the offer was not extended to fellow Alamo survivor Juana Navarro Alsbury for her son of similar age.

Santa Anna ordered that the Tejano civilian survivors be allowed to return to their homes in San Antonio. Susanna and Joe, a Texian slave, were allowed to travel towards the Anglo settlements, escorted by Ben, a former American slave who served as Mexican Colonel Juan Almonte's cook. Each woman received $2 and a blanket and was allowed to go free and spread the news of the destruction that awaited those who opposed the Mexican government. Before they departed, Santa Anna ordered that the surviving members of the Mexican army parade in a grand review, intending that Joe and Susanna would thus warn the remainder of the Texian forces that his army was unbeatable.

When the small party of survivors arrived in Gonzales on March 13, they found Sam Houston, the commander of all Texian forces, waiting there with about 400 men. After Susanna and Joe related the details of the battle and the strength of Santa Anna's army, Houston advised all civilians to evacuate and then ordered the army to retreat. This began the Runaway Scrape, in which much of Texas' population, including the acting government, rushed eastward to escape the advancing Mexican army.

== Susanna's witness accounts ==
Susanna reported, after the battle, the following about the siege and final fight:

- There were very few casualties before the final assault. She did not know the number.
- She confirmed the legendary "line in the sand" incident, where William Barrett Travis gave defenders the choice of staying or leaving, did happen. However, she said that it happened the day before the final assault, when it is believed to have happened on either March 3 or March 4.
- On the morning of the assault, Almaron ran into where she had hidden, made his final statements to her and revealed that the Mexicans were inside, then returned to his duty. She never saw him again, nor did she ever see his body.
- She hid inside the chapel, and did not see the actual battle. One defender ran inside during the battle, attempting to hide, but was killed by Mexican soldiers.
- When she was discovered, a Mexican officer intervened. She believed he was a British mercenary named either Black or Almonte. He actually was Juan Almonte, who spoke perfect English, having been educated in New Orleans.
- Outside there was a single survivor, found hiding, who unsuccessfully begged for mercy and was killed. Joe also reported this, claiming the man's name was Warner. However, no Warner is listed as being at the Alamo. The most similar name is Henry Warnell, who departed the Alamo as a courier, probably on February 28, 1836, and died in Port Lavaca, Texas, of wounds received either during the battle or his escape in June 1836.
- She saw the body of Davy Crockett between the chapel and the barracks building. This recollection of Crockett's death stands in direct conflict with the Jesús Sánchez Garza - José Enrique de la Peña account.
- She was taken to a house where she had previously lived, and from there could see the pyres of the dead being burned.
- The next day she was taken before Santa Anna, and Almonte, or Black, convinced Santa Anna to release her rather than imprison her.
- She was sent east with Joe, and on the way to Gonzales, she was intercepted by a party including Deaf Smith.
- At some point after the battle, she had no recollections, only that she wept for days.

Other survivors, including Enrique Esparza (the son of Alamo defender Gregorio Esparza) confirmed some of Susanna's account.

Since Susanna was an intelligent and well-spoken woman, Santa Anna had her identify the bodies of all the commanders and main players.

== After the Alamo ==
Susanna left no personal written accounts of what happened at the Battle of the Alamo, as she was illiterate. However, she did give numerous oral accounts and interviews. She remarried soon afterward to a man named John Williams on Nov 27, 1837, but they divorced almost immediately afterward on the grounds of cruelty. She married a third time on Dec 20, 1838 to a man named Francis P. Herring, but he died of alcoholism in 1843. She married a fourth time on Dec 7, 1847, to a man named Peter Bellows (also known as Bellis or Belles). By 1854, Susanna had left him, and Bellows filed for divorce in 1857, accusing her of adultery and prostitution. There is no evidence that Susanna ever engaged in prostitution. On Dec 9, 1857 she married a fifth and final time to a man named Joseph W. Hannig, a cabinet maker, and with whom she remained for the rest of her life.

== Death and legacy ==
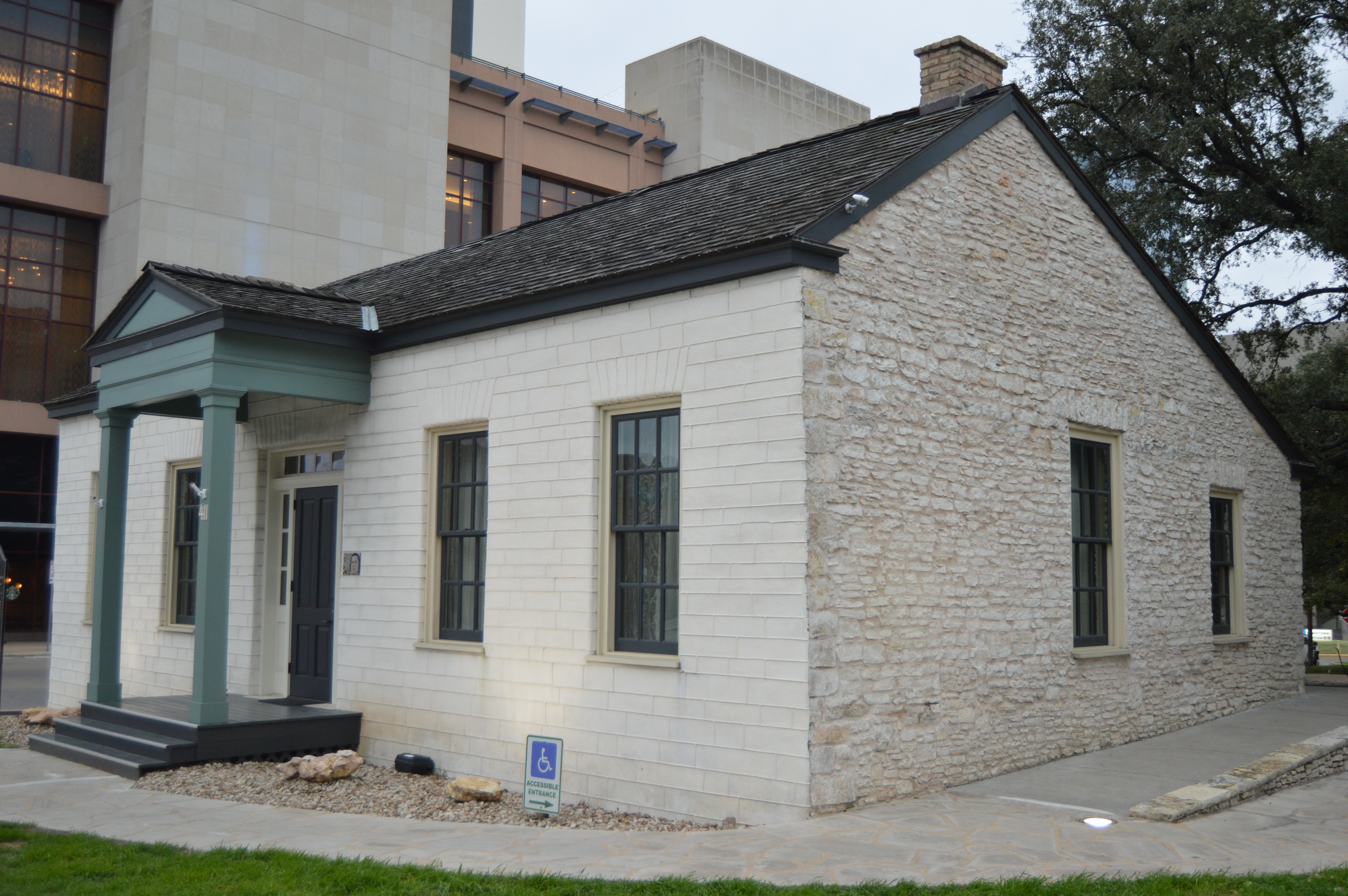
Dickinson-Hannig Museum

Susanna died in 1883 and was buried in Oakwood Cemetery in Austin, with the following inscription:

"Sacred to the Memory of Susan A. Wife of J. W. Hannig Died Oct. 7, 1883 Aged 68 Years."

Hannig lived long after Susanna (dying in 1890) and placed the original marble marker. The state of Texas added a marble slab above their graves on March 2, 1949. A cenotaph honoring Susanna was placed in the Texas State Cemetery in Austin.

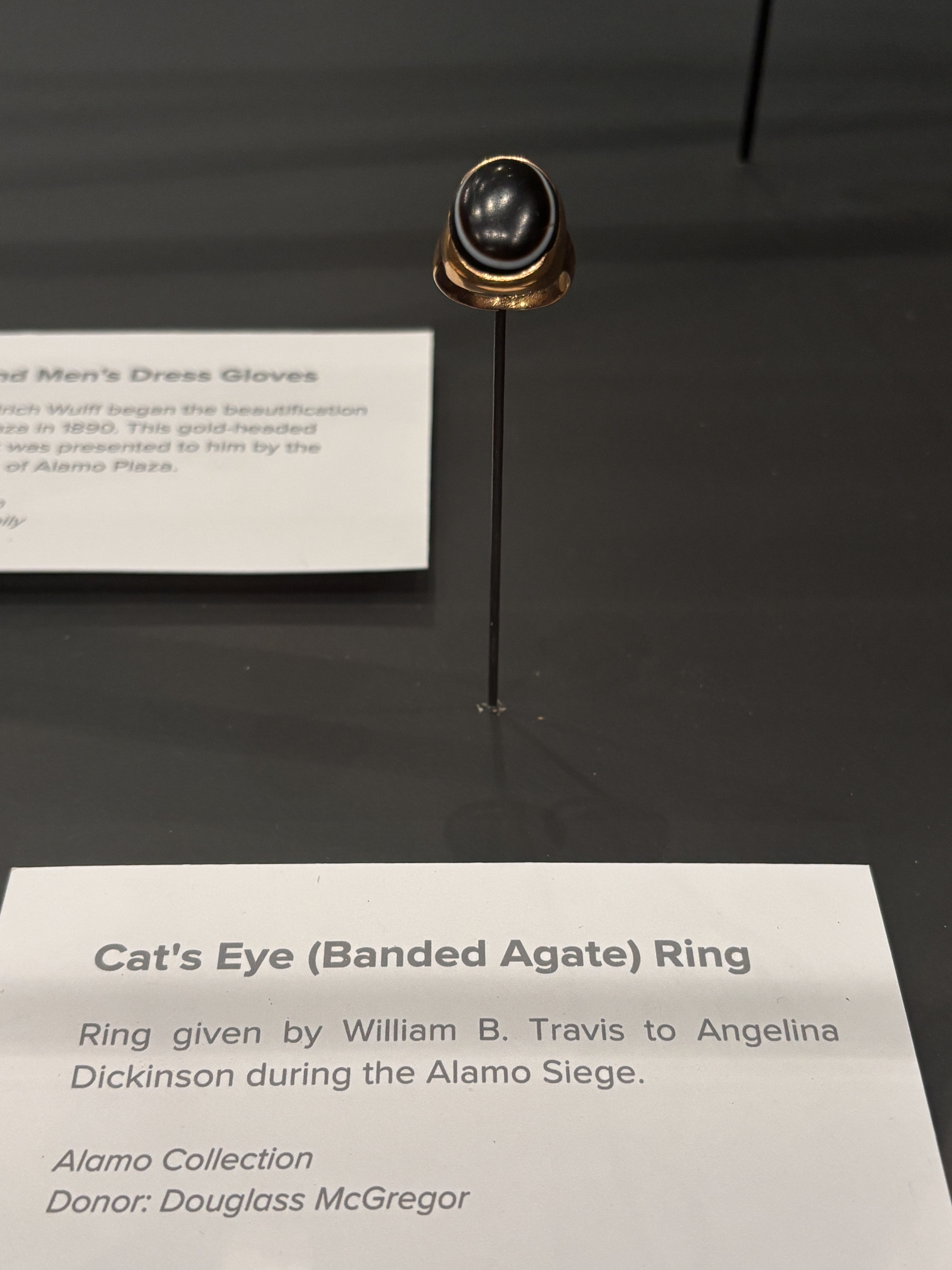
William B. Travis ring given to Angelina Dickinson during the Alamo siege, on display at the Alamo Exhibit in San Antonio.

The home Joseph Hannig built in Austin in 1869 became a museum, The Joseph and Susanna Dickinson Hannig Museum, dedicated to Susanna and the other Alamo survivors. The home, which the Hannigs occupied from 1869-1873, is the only known surviving residence of Susanna Dickinson.

Susanna's daughter Angelina married at age 17, to a farmer named John Maynard Griffith. Together they had three children, but the marriage later ended in divorce. She then relocated to New Orleans, leaving two of her children with her mother Susanna, and one with an uncle. In New Orleans, she is believed to have married an Oscar Holmes and had a child with him. She lived for a time in Galveston, with a man named Jim Britton, to whom she gave the ring given to her by Colonel Travis. She died in 1869, by then living under the name "Em Britton".

=== Monuments ===
- Susannah Dickinson & Angelina Dickinson Statue, Statues of Heroes at The Alamo, by Bruce Greene

== In film and other media ==
Susanna was portrayed by Joan O'Brien in the 1960 John Wayne feature film The Alamo. She was featured in the dramatic final scene walking away from the fort and into the sunset with Angelina on the back of a mule, and a young slave boy walking with her. As she walks past Santa Anna she exchanges some very dramatic looks with him. Other important events dramatized in the film include her being captured in the chapel at bayonet point, and her electing to stay as Santa Anna allows the other women to leave the fort before the battle.

Kathleen York portrayed Susanna in the 1987 film The Alamo: 13 Days to Glory. After the battle, Col. Black (David Ogden Stiers) enters the room where the women and children are hiding and says that Santa Anna wishes to meet with her. After she refuses, he tells her that she should accept his invitation, that the lives of her children and comrades depend on it.

In the 2004 version of The Alamo, Laura Clifton portrays Susanna Dickinson. She has a fairly minor part in the film. However, in the final battle scene she is shown witnessing Almaron's death, who a little earlier calls her by her name. In almost every scene she is in, she is shown holding Angelina.

In 2015, Dickinson was portrayed by Alixandra von Renner, in the History Channel miniseries, Texas Rising.

== See also ==
- List of Texan survivors of the Battle of the Alamo
