= Juana Navarro Alsbury =

Texan survivor of the Battle of the Alamo

Juana Gertrudis Navarro Alsbury (1812 – July 23, 1888) was one of the few Texian survivors of the Battle of the Alamo during the Texas Revolution in 1836. As Mexican forces entered her hometown, San Antonio de Bexar, on February 23, Alsbury's cousin by marriage, James Bowie, brought her with him to the Alamo Mission so that he could protect her. Bowie, the co-commander of the Texian forces, collapsed from illness on the second day of the siege; Alsbury nursed him throughout the remainder of the siege. On March 4, Texian co-commander William Barret Travis sent her as an emissary to Mexican commander Antonio Lopez de Santa Anna to negotiate an honorable surrender for the Texian forces. She made no headway, and her visit likely increased Santa Anna's impatience to end the siege in a spectacular fashion. Santa Anna launched an early-morning assault on the Alamo on March 6.

Most Texian troops were killed during the Battle of the Alamo. Two of them died in front of Alsbury. One Texian was killed trying to protect Alsbury, her sister Gertrudis, and her young son Alejo Perez Jr., from Mexican troops. The other was found hiding in her room. The women were rescued by a Mexican officer and interviewed by Santa Anna before being released.

Alsbury belonged to a prominent family within San Antonio de Bexar and was raised by her uncle Juan Martin de Veramendi, who briefly served as governor of Texas. She married three times. Her first husband died of cholera; the second, Dr. Horace Alsbury, was captured by Mexican forces during the Mexican–American War; after his death, she married a cousin of her first husband.

== Early years ==
Juana Gertrudis Navarro was born in San Antonio de Béxar (modern San Antonio, Texas) to José Ángel Navarro and Concepción Cervantes. Her exact birthdate was unrecorded, but she was baptized on December 28, 1812. The Navarro family was well known in Béxar; both Juana's father and his brother, José Antonio Navarro, held prominent positions in local government.

Juana was about 17 when her mother died on January 30, 1830. Juana's father remarried almost a year later in January 1831. She and her younger sister Gertrudis were adopted by their father's sister, Josefa Navarro, who was married to Juan Martín de Veramendi. The Navarro girls considered their cousin Ursula another sister. Veramendi served as governor of Coahuila y Tejas from 1832 to 1833. Although Juana spoke little English, she and her family socialized with the prominent Anglo families in Béxar, including Samuel and Mary Maverick.

In 1832, Juana married Alejo Pérez Ramigio, a relative of the De León family which had founded Victoria, Texas. Pérez was a merchant, with a license to transport goods to and from Monclova The couple had one son, Alijo Perez Jr., and may have had a daughter who died in infancy.

Juana's adoptive parents and her cousin Ursula died in a cholera epidemic in Monclova in 1833. Her husband died of the same disease in either 1834 or 1835.

== Texas Revolution ==
In the early to mid-1830s, the political situation in Mexico underwent much upheaval. Federalists wished to delegate many powers to the individual Mexican states, while centralists wished to consolidate power at the national level. In 1835, several interior Mexican states, angry at the increasingly dictatorial policies of Mexican President Antonio López de Santa Anna, took up arms against the Mexican government. Texians launched their own armed rebellion, known as the Texas Revolution, in October 1835. Over the next two months, Texians successfully removed all Mexican troops from the region. Their actions infuriated Mexican president Antonio Lopez de Santa Anna, who immediately began preparations to invade Texas. Most of the Navarro family supported the Texian cause. An exception was Juana's father, who joined Santa Anna's new Army of Operations in Texas as an officer. Although he remained loyal to Mexico, José Ángel Navarro had been very vocal in his disagreement with Santa Anna's overthrow of the 1824 Constitution of Mexico.

In January 1836, Juana married again, to Dr. Horace Alsbury. The couple had known each other for some time; Alsbury had many meetings in Béxar with James Bowie, the widower of Juana's cousin Ursula. Alsbury was a Texian spy, gathering information about the Mexican army.

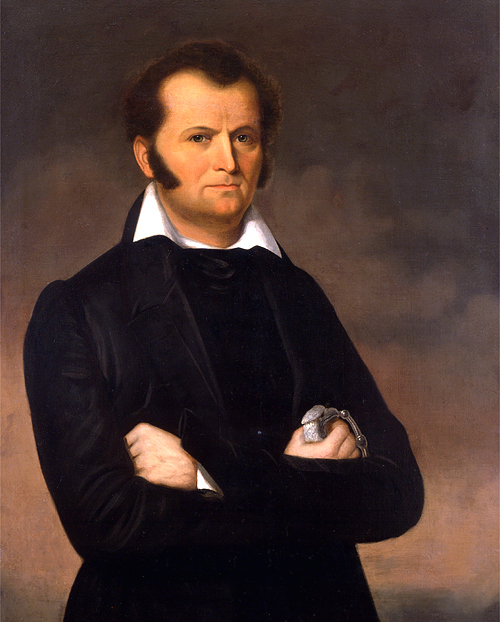
James Bowie escorted Juana and her family into the Alamo Mission for safety.

Rumors soon flew that Santa Anna and his army were coming directly toward Béxar, location of the Alamo Mission, one of two Texian garrisons. Many local residents fled the town. On February 23, Horace Alsbury left for East Texas, either to find a safe place to bring his wife, her son, and her sister Gertrudis, or to gather reinforcements for the undermanned Texian garrison. Alsbury left his family with Bowie, a colonel in the Texian militia.

Later that afternoon, the vanguard of Santa Anna's army arrived. Bowie moved the women and children into the Alamo. The women and child were given a room in "the northwest corner of the fort", near the quarters of Texian commanders Bowie and William Barret Travis. By the end of the day, more than 1,500 Mexican troops had entered Bexar and initiated a siege of the Alamo.

At some point on the second day of the siege, Bowie collapsed from illness. He was confined to his bed and Juana acted as his nurse. Throughout the siege, the Mexican army kept up a continual bombardment, while the Texians were forced to conserve their ammunition and rarely respond. Conditions were difficult for the women and children in the fort. There was little food, and the constant noise made it difficult to sleep.

On March 3, an additional 1,000 Mexican soldiers arrived in Bexar. The Texians were vastly outnumbered, although between 32 and 80 additional men were able to break through Mexican lines to join them in the Alamo, bringing Texian numbers to approximately 250.

The following evening (March 4), Travis sent Juana to negotiate an honorable surrender for the Alamo defenders. Fellow survivor Susanna Dickinson misinterpreted Juana's mission and, years later, accused her of deserting the Texians to provide information about their defenses to her father, who served on Santa Anna's staff. Historians place no credence in the theory that Juana spied for the Mexican army, but acknowledge that her visit likely increased Santa Anna's impatience to end the siege. As historian Timothy Todish noted, "there would have been little glory in a bloodless victory". The following morning, Santa Anna announced to his staff that the assault would take place early on March 6.

The Mexican army attacked the Alamo just before 6:00 am on March 6. During the battle, Juana and her son and sister hid in one of the rooms along the west wall. Juana dressed her son as a girl "in the hope that Mexican troops would not harm him". As the battle approached their rooms, Gertrudis Navarro opened the door to signal that they meant no harm. When Mexican soldiers threatened them, a Texian defender (Note: According to Todish et al. (1998), p. 54, the Texian defender was either Edwin Mitchell or Napoleon Mitchell; Alsbury knew only his last name.) charged into the room to defend them; he was quickly killed, as was a young Tejano who took refuge in the room. Soldiers rifled through Juana's trunk and confiscated most of its contents, including her clothing, coins, jewelry, and even "the watches that Travis and other officers had given her for safekeeping."

A Mexican officer entered the room and forbade the soldiers from harming the women and child. When the battle ended, almost all of the Texians were dead. Seven women and seven children survived. Juana and her family were escorted out of the Alamo by her former brother-in-law, Manuel Pérez, who was a soldier in Santa Anna's army. Pérez took them to the home of her father.

Santa Anna personally interviewed each surviving noncombatant on March 7. He was most impressed with Dickinson, and offered to adopt her young daughter and educate the child in Mexico City. No similar offer was extended to Juana, whose son was approximately the same age. Each woman was given a blanket and two silver pesos. The survivors requested permission to find the bodies of their loved ones and give them a proper burial, but were denied by Santa Anna.

Juana and her sister were in an awkward situation. Many Anglos in Béxar considered all Mexicans traitors to the Texas Revolution. Many of those in Béxar still loyal to Mexico considered Juana and her sister traitors for being in the Alamo. The Texas Revolution ended in April 1836, when the Texian army captured Santa Anna at the Battle of San Jacinto. Juana's father died several months later, leaving each of his daughters 25 head of cattle.

== Later years ==
Following the war, the Alsburys moved to Calaveras Ranch, property her family had long owned along the road to Goliad. The Mexican government refused to recognize the new Republic of Texas. In September 1842, Mexican general Adrian Woll invaded Texas and captured Béxar. He arrested several dozen Texians, including Horace Alsbury, and marched them into Mexico. Juana followed as far as Candela, Coahuila. She waited there for almost two years, until Horace Alsbury was released in 1844. The couple returned to Texas. Horace Alsbury then joined troops fighting the Mexican–American War. He died while in the army in 1846 or 1847. At some point after this, Juana married again, to Juan Pérez, her first husband's cousin.

In 1857 Juana petitioned the legislature of the State of Texas for one of the pensions available to people who had served in the Texas Revolution. For her service as a nurse to Bowie, her request was granted.

Juana died on July 23, 1888, at her son's home along Salado Creek in Bexar County, Texas. She was either buried there or at a Catholic cemetery within San Antonio.

== Legacy ==
For many decades, published accounts of the Battle of the Alamo listed only two survivors, Susannah Dickinson and her daughter Angelina, "the Babe of the Alamo".

In the late 1880s Juana was interviewed by her friend Mary Maverick and historian John S. Ford about her recollections of the Battle of the Alamo. The interview took place over 50 years after the battle, and the resulting synopsis was written in the "romantic post-Civil War language of hyperbole that was fashionable in the 1880s". As one of only three accounts by Texian survivors, Juana's interview is "among the most relied upon sources about these non-combatant women and children." The interview was not published until 1995, when it appeared in historian Timothy Matovina's book The Alamo Remembered: Tejano Accounts and Perspectives.

== See also ==
- List of Texan survivors of the Battle of the Alamo

== Sources ==
- Chartier, JoAnn; Enss, Chris (2004), She Wore a Yellow Ribbon: Women Soldiers and Patriots of the Western Frontier, Globe Pequot, ISBN 978-0-76272-601-1
- Edmondson, J.R. (2000), The Alamo Story-From History to Current Conflicts, Plano, TX: Republic of Texas Press, ISBN 1-55622-678-0
- Guerra, Dora Elizondo (2012), "Two Silver Pesos and a Blanket: the Texas Revolution and the Non-Combatant Women Who Survived the Battle of the Alamo", in Scheer, Mary L. (ed.), Women and the Texas Revolution, University of North Texas Press, pp. 123–152, ISBN 978-1-57441-469-1
- Hardin, Stephen L. (1994), Texian Iliad, Austin, TX: University of Texas Press, ISBN 0-292-73086-1
- Hopewell, Clifford (1994), James Bowie Texas Fighting Man: A Biography, Austin, TX: Eakin Press, ISBN 0-89015-881-9
- Lindley, Thomas Ricks (2003), Alamo Traces: New Evidence and New Conclusions, Lanham, MD: Republic of Texas Press, ISBN 1-55622-983-6
- Matovina, Timothy M. (1995), The Alamo Remembered: Tejano Accounts and Perspectives, University of Texas Press, ISBN 978-0-29275-186-6
- Petite, Mary Deborah (1999), 1836 Facts about the Alamo and the Texas War for Independence, Mason City, IA: Savas Publishing Company, ISBN 1-882810-35-X
- Todish, Timothy J.; Todish, Terry; Spring, Ted (1998), Alamo Sourcebook, 1836: A Comprehensive Guide to the Battle of the Alamo and the Texas Revolution, Austin, TX: Eakin Press, ISBN 978-1-57168-152-2
