= Maria Andrea Castanon Villanueva =

Alamo survivor (1803–1899)

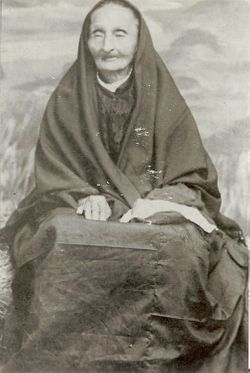
- Born: December 1, 1803; Presidio, New Spain
- Died: February 10, 1899 (aged 95)
- Known for: One of the last survivors of the Battle of the Alamo

Maria Andrea Castanon Villanueva (December 1, 1785 or 1803 – February 10, 1899), also known as Señora Candelaria, was an American Tejano woman known to be one of the last survivors of the Battle of the Alamo.

== Biography ==
Some sources place Villanueva's birth at 1785, which would make her 113 at death. Though, baptism records put her birth year at 1803. She was born in Presidio, New Spain. At around age three, her family moved to Laredo, and to San Antonio in 1820. In San Antonio, she worked for María Gertrudis Pérez Cassiano. She was married twice; first to Silberio Flores y Abrigo, on May 5, 1827, and second to Candelario Villanueva, which the ceremony occurred in the San Fernando Cathedral, and Blas María Herrera attended.

There is some doubt that Villanueva was present at the Alamo. Though, people such as John Salmon Ford present support her inclusion. While there, she gave medical assistance to James Bowie, and served food to Davy Crockett. She was given a $120.00 yearly pension. She spent the rest of her life giving accounts of the Alamo. She died on February 10, 1899, aged 95. William Hugh Young was one of her pallbearers.
