= Battle of the Alamo =

Major battle of the Texas Revolution

- Part of the Texas Revolution
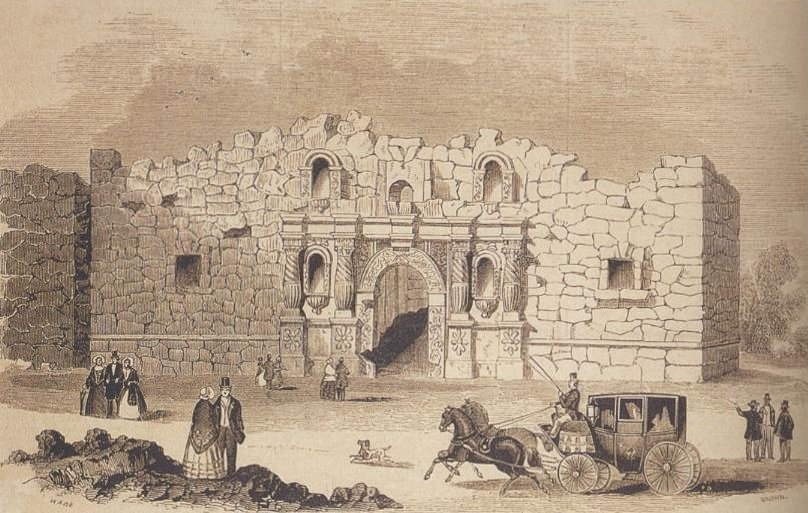
- The Alamo, as drawn in 1854
Date	February 23 – March 6, 1836
Location	Alamo Mission, San Antonio, Mexican Texas 29°25′32″N 98°29′10″W
Result	Mexican victory

Belligerents
Mexico	Republic of Texas

Commanders and leaders
Antonio López de Santa Anna; Manuel Fernández Castrillón; Martín Perfecto de Cos	William Travis †; James Bowie †; Davy Crockett †; William Carey †; George Kimble †; Almaron Dickinson †

Strength
~2,000–2,100	185–260

Casualties and losses
Mexican official version 60 killed and 250 wounded Texan estimation 400–600 killed and wounded	182–257 killed

The Battle of the Alamo (February 23 – March 6, 1836) was a pivotal event and military engagement in the Texas Revolution. Following a 13-day siege, Mexican troops under president and general Antonio López de Santa Anna reclaimed the Alamo Mission near San Antonio de Béxar (now San Antonio).

About one hundred Texians had been garrisoned at the mission, and they were supplemented by around one hundred subsequent reinforcements, led by eventual Alamo co-commanders James Bowie and William B. Travis. On February 23, approximately 1,500 Mexicans marched into San Antonio de Béxar as the first step in a campaign to retake Texas.

In the early morning hours of March 6, the Mexican Army advanced on the Alamo. After repelling two attacks, the Texians were unable to fend off a third. As Mexican soldiers scaled the walls, most of the Texian fighters withdrew into interior buildings. On the basis of "perhaps" ten sources, William C. Davis posits three separate escapes of Texian combatants from the Alamo, consisting of perhaps 80 men. Phillip Thomas Tucker also sees three discrete Texian escapes, totaling as many as 120 men. Nearly all Texian combatants were killed. Those who fled outside the walls were dispatched by Mexican lancers, who had been positioned for that purpose.

Several noncombatants were sent to Gonzales to spread word of the Texian defeat. The news sparked a scramble to join the Texian army and a panic, known as "The Runaway Scrape", in which the Texian army, most settlers, and the government of the new, self-proclaimed, but officially unrecognized Republic of Texas fled eastward toward the U.S. ahead of the advancing Mexican Army.

Santa Anna's execution of surrendering soldiers during the battle inspired many Texians and Tejanos to join the Texian Army. The Texians defeated the portion of the Mexican Army led by Santa Anna at the Battle of San Jacinto, on April 21, 1836. The capture of Santa Anna ended the war.

Hardin notes that the Texians "could scarcely believe that enemy troops, the majority of whom had never known defeat in Texas, would complacently obey the orders of a captured commander." The cessation of hostilities and the withdrawal to Mexico of the divided forces, led by other Mexican generals, guaranteed the survival of the Republic of Texas.

In Mexico, the battle has often been overshadowed by events from the Mexican–American War of 1846–1848. The Alamo complex gradually became known as a battle site rather than a former mission. The Texas Legislature purchased land and the long barracks building (the former convento) in the early part of the 20th century. The Alamo church, which had been purchased by the state in 1883, was designated an official Texas State Shrine. A roofless ruin at the time of the battle, it was intended to have three floors and a large dome framed by two tall bell towers. The gable and the pitched roof it concealed were added by the U.S. Army in 1849.

The Alamo has been the subject of numerous non-fiction works, the first of which were produced in 1843. Most Americans, however, are more familiar with the myths and legends spread by many of the movie and television adaptations, including the 1950s Disney miniseries Davy Crockett and John Wayne's 1960 film The Alamo.

== Background ==
In 1835, following the repeal of the federalist 1824 Constitution of Mexico, Mexico adopted Las Siete Leyes ("The Seven Laws"), a new constitutional framework that replaced the First Mexican Republic with a unitary republic officially named the Mexican Republic (Spanish: República Mexicana).

New policies that entailed restricting or eliminating slavery, limiting immigration from the U.S., and increased enforcement of laws and import tariffs (tariffs had initially been waived for seven years) incited many immigrants to revolt. The border region of Mexican Texas was largely populated by immigrants from the United States, some legal but most illegal. Mexico tried to end Anglo American immigration in 1830, but their number doubled by 1834, from 10,000 to 21,000). Some immigrants had brought large numbers of slaves with them, so that by 1836, there were approximately 5,000 enslaved persons in a total non-native population estimated at 38,470. Campbell, author of the first book-length study of slavery in Texas in 1989, says slavery was minimized within Texas by "many historians, writers, and creators of popular culture" who "preferred to see Texas as essentially western rather than southern." The Handbook of Texas lacked an entry on slavery, and what Campbell calls the "best state history" devoted less than three pages to it. Campbell notes that in the 1850s more than a quarter of free Texas families owned slaves, and the latter constituted 30% of the state's population, percentages comparable to that of Virginia, "the oldest slave state in the Union."

The colonists were accustomed to a federalist government that made special exemptions from Mexican law exclusively for them, and to extensive individual rights, including the right to own slaves. Mexico's shift towards centralism and its interest in enforcing its laws resulted in growing displeasure among the colonists, particularly when the centralized government ended local federal exemptions to the ban on slavery, previously negotiated by Stephen Austin and others. Already suspicious after previous United States attempts to purchase Texas, Mexican authorities blamed much of the Texian unrest on United States immigrants. Most of them had entered illegally and made little effort to adapt to the Mexican culture, and they continued the practice of slavery in violation of Mexico laws.

In October, Texians engaged Mexican troops in the first official battle of the Texas Revolution. Determined to quell the rebellion of immigrants, Santa Anna began assembling a large force, the Army of Operations in Texas, to restore order. Most of his soldiers were less-experienced recruits, many conscripted.

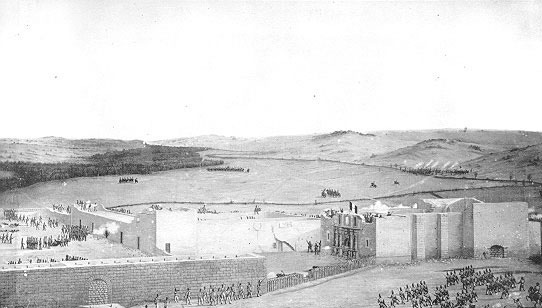
The Fall of the Alamo, painted by Theodore Gentilz in 1844, depicts the Alamo complex from the south. The Low Barracks, the church, and the wooden palisade connecting them are in the foreground.

The Texians defeated the Mexican troops already stationed in Texas. The last group of Mexican soldiers in the region—commanded by Santa Anna's brother-in-law, General Martín Perfecto de Cos—surrendered on December 9 following the siege of Béxar. By this point, the Texian Army was dominated by very recent arrivals to the region, primarily illegal immigrants from the United States.

Gary Brown says the Texian armies that fought at San Antonio and Goliad were dominated by mercenaries. He characterizes the most effective of these militias that were raised outside of Texas: "Santa Anna claimed the New Orleans Greys were mercenaries and pirates, and technically he was correct.... they were military mercenaries, not pioneers or settlers, and they came to Texas for adventure and material gain—not constitutional freedoms."

Many of the Texian settlers who had participated in the revolt returned home, unprepared for a long campaign. Mexico's response to this violation of its sovereign rights was the Tornel Decree, a "no quarter" policy formulated by the Mexican Minister of War. Approved by the Mexican congress and issued on December 30, 1835, it defined irregular invaders as pirates, "being citizens of no nation presently at war with the republic, and fighting under no recognized flag." In this historical period, captured pirates were executed immediately.

Josefina Zoraida Vázquez characterizes the decree "a desperate attempt to maintain control of the territory in the face of the flagrant intervention of foreigners against Mexico's government." Santa Anna reiterated this message in a strongly worded letter to United States President Andrew Jackson. This letter was not widely distributed, making it likely that most of the United States recruits serving in the Texian Army were not aware there would be no prisoners of war.

When Mexican troops departed San Antonio de Béxar (now San Antonio, Texas, USA), Texian soldiers captured the Mexican garrison at the Alamo Mission which was a former Spanish religious outpost which had been converted to a makeshift fort by the recently expelled Mexican Army. Described by Santa Anna as an "irregular fortification hardly worthy of the name", the Alamo had been designed to withstand an assault by Indigenous attackers, not an artillery-equipped army.

The complex was sprawled over 3 acres (1.2 ha), providing almost 1,320 feet (400 m) of perimeter to defend. An interior plaza was bordered on the east by the church and to the south by a one-story building known as the Low Barracks. A wooden palisade stretched between these two buildings. The two-story Long Barracks extended north from the church. At the northern corner of the east wall stood a cattle pen and horse corral. The walls surrounding the complex were at least 2.75 feet (0.84 m) thick and ranged from 9–12 ft (2.7–3.7 m) high. (Note: The plaza covered an area 75 feet (23 m) long and 62 feet (19 m) wide. The Low Barracks was 114 feet (35 m) long, and the Long Barracks was 186 feet (57 m) long and 18 feet (5.5 m) wide. (Myers (1948), pp. 180–181.))

To compensate for the lack of firing ports, Texian engineer Green B. Jameson constructed catwalks to allow defenders to fire over the walls; this method, however, left the rifleman's upper body exposed. Mexican forces had left behind 19 cannons, which Jameson installed along the walls. A large 18-pounder had arrived in Texas with the New Orleans Greys. Jameson positioned this cannon in the southwest corner of the compound. He boasted to Texian Army commander Sam Houston that the Texians could "whip 10 to 1 with our artillery".

== Prelude to battle ==
The fact remains that the Texian garrison was undermanned and underprovisioned, with fewer than 100 soldiers remaining by January 6, 1836. Colonel James C. Neill, the acting Alamo commander, wrote to the provisional government: "If there has ever been a dollar here I have no knowledge of it". Neill requested additional troops and supplies, stressing that the garrison was likely to be unable to withstand a siege lasting longer than four days. The Texian government at that time was in turmoil and unable to provide much assistance. (Note: A week after Neill sent his letter, the Texian provisional legislature impeached the governor, who in turn disbanded the legislature. The interim constitution had given neither party the authority to take these actions, and no one in Texas was entirely sure who was in charge. (Todish et al. (1998), pp. 30–31.)) Four different men claimed to have been given command over the entire army. (Note: Sam Houston, James Fannin, Frank W. Johnson, and Dr. James Grant. (Todish et al. (1998), p. 30.)) On January 14, Neill approached one of these men, Sam Houston, for assistance in gathering supplies, clothing, and ammunition.

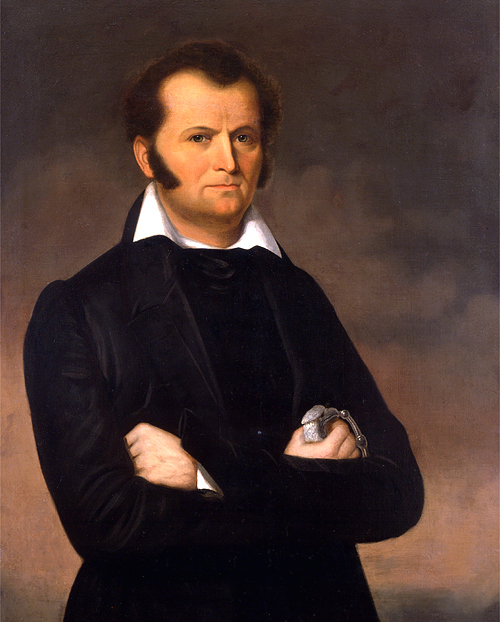
James Bowie arrived at the Alamo Mission on January 19 with orders to destroy the complex. He instead became the garrison's co-commander.

Houston could not spare the number of men necessary to mount a successful defense. Instead, he sent Colonel James Bowie with 30 men to remove the artillery from the Alamo and destroy the complex. (Note: Houston's orders to Bowie were vague, and historians disagree on their intent. One interpretation is that Bowie's orders were to destroy only the barricades that the Mexican Army had erected around San Antonio de Béxar, and that he should then wait in the Alamo until Governor Henry Smith decided whether the mission should be demolished and the artillery removed. Smith never gave orders on this issue. (Edmondson (2000), p. 252.)) Bowie was unable to transport the artillery since the Alamo garrison lacked the necessary draft animals. Neill soon persuaded Bowie that the location held strategic importance.

In a letter to Governor Henry Smith, Bowie argued that "the salvation of Texas depends in great measure on keeping Béxar out of the hands of the enemy. It serves as the frontier picquet guard, and if it were in the possession of Santa Anna, there is no stronghold from which to repel him in his march towards the Sabine." (Note: The Sabine River marked the eastern border of Mexican Texas.) The letter to Smith ended, "Colonel Neill and myself have come to the solemn resolution that we will rather die in these ditches than give it up to the enemy."

Bowie also wrote to the provisional government, asking for "men, money, rifles, and cannon powder". Unfortunately, few reinforcements were authorized. Cavalry officer William B. Travis arrived in Béxar with 30 men on February 3. Five days later, a small group of volunteers arrived, including the famous frontiersman and former U.S. Congressman David Crockett of Tennessee. Although local Tejanos were not very supportive of the Texian's resistance, it is believed that 20 dissidents who sought greater localization of institutions of power joined the volunteer force.

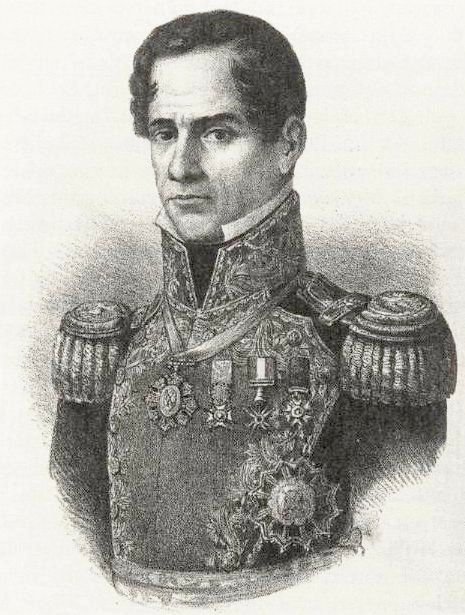
General Antonio Lopez de Santa Anna led Mexican troops into Texas in 1836.

On February 11, Neill left the Alamo, determined to recruit additional reinforcements and gather supplies. He transferred command to Travis, the highest-ranking regular army officer in the garrison. Volunteers comprised much of the garrison, and they were unwilling to accept Travis as their leader. (Note: Volunteers in the Texian Army asserted the right to choose their own leaders, and most of them were unwilling to serve under officers of the regular army.) The men instead elected Bowie, who had a reputation as a fierce fighter, as their commander. Bowie celebrated by getting very intoxicated and creating havoc in Béxar. To mitigate the resulting ill feelings, Bowie agreed to share command with Travis.

As the Texians struggled to find men and supplies, Santa Anna continued to gather men at San Luis Potosí; by the end of 1835, his army numbered 6,019 soldiers. Rather than advance along the coast, where supplies and reinforcements could be easily delivered by sea, Santa Anna ordered his army inland to Béxar, the political center of Texas and the site of Cos's defeat. The army began its march north in late December. Officers used the long journey to train the men. Many of the new recruits did not know how to aim their muskets, and many refused to fire from the shoulder because of the strong recoil.

Progress was slow. There were not enough mules to transport all of the supplies, and many of the teamsters and civilians, quit when their pay was delayed. To make things worse, many soldaderas – women and children who followed the army – consumed much of their already scarce supplies. The soldiers were soon reduced to partial rations. On February 12, they crossed the Rio Grande. (Note: Although the Rio Grande now marks the border between Texas and Mexico, in this era the Nueces River, several hundred miles north, was considered the southern boundary of Mexican Texas.) Temperatures in Texas reached record lows, and by February 13, an estimated 15–16 inches (38–41 cm) of snow had fallen. Hypothermia, dysentery, and Comanche raiding parties took a heavy toll on the Mexican soldiers.

On February 21, Santa Anna and his Avant-garde reached the banks of the Medina River, 25 miles (40 km) from Béxar. Unaware of the Mexican Army's proximity, the majority of the Alamo garrison joined the other Béxar residents at a fiesta. (Note: The fiesta was in celebration of the birthday of George Washington, the first president of the United States.) After learning of the planned celebration, Santa Anna ordered General Joaquín Ramírez y Sesma to immediately seize the unprotected Alamo; nonetheless sudden rains halted that raid.

== Siege ==
=== Investment ===
In the early hours of February 23, residents began fleeing Béxar, fearing the Mexican army's imminent arrival. Although unconvinced by recent reports, Travis stationed a soldier in the San Fernando church bell tower, the highest location in town, to watch for signs of an approaching force. Several hours later, Texian scouts reported seeing Mexican troops 1.5 miles (2.4 km) outside the town.

Few arrangements had been made for a potential siege. One group of Texians scrambled to herd cattle into the Alamo, while others scrounged for food in the recently abandoned houses. Several members of the garrison who had been living in town brought their families with them when they reported to the Alamo. Among these were Almaron Dickinson, who brought his wife Susanna and their infant daughter Angelina; Bowie, who was accompanied by his deceased wife's cousins, Gertrudis Navarro and Juana Navarro Alsbury, and her young son; along with Gregorio Esparza, whose family climbed through the window of the Alamo church after the Mexican army arrived. Other members of the garrison failed to report for duty and most of the men working outside Béxar did not try to sneak past Mexican lines.

I reply to you, according to the order of His Excellency, that the Mexican army cannot come to terms under any conditions with rebellious foreigners to whom there is no recourse left, if they wish to save their lives, than to place themselves immediately at the disposal of the Supreme Government from whom alone they may expect clemency after some considerations.

— The response of José Bartres to Texian requests for an honorable surrender, as quoted in the journal of Juan Almonte

By late afternoon, Béxar was occupied by about 1,500 Mexican soldiers. When the Mexican troops raised a blood-red flag signifying no quarter, Travis responded with a blast from the Alamo's largest cannon. Believing that Travis had acted hastily, Bowie sent Jameson to meet with Santa Anna.

Travis was angered that Bowie had acted unilaterally and sent his own representative, Captain Albert Martin. Both emissaries met with Colonel Juan Almonte and José Bartres. According to Almonte, the Texians asked for an honorable surrender, but were informed that any surrender must be unconditional. On learning this, Bowie and Travis mutually agreed to fire the cannon again. (Note: Although Santa Anna later reported that Texian cannon fire on February 23 killed two Mexican soldiers and wounded eight others, no other Mexican officer reported fatalities from that day. (Todish et al. (1998), p. 40., Edmondson (2000), p. 304.))

=== Skirmishes ===
The first night of the siege was relatively quiet. Over the next few days, Mexican soldiers established artillery batteries, initially about 1,000 feet (300 m) from the south and east walls of the Alamo. A third battery was positioned southeast of the fort. Each night the batteries inched closer to the Alamo walls. During the first week of the siege more than 200 cannonballs landed in the Alamo plaza. At first, the Texians matched Mexican artillery fire, often reusing the Mexican cannonballs. However, on February 26, Travis ordered the artillery to conserve powder and shot.

Two notable events occurred on Wednesday, February 24. First, Bowie collapsed from illness, leaving Travis in sole command of the garrison. Then, late that afternoon, two Mexican scouts became the first fatalities of the siege. The following morning, 200–300 Mexican soldiers crossed the San Antonio River and took cover in abandoned shacks near the Alamo walls. Several Texians ventured out to burn the huts while Texians within the Alamo provided cover fire. After a two-hour skirmish, the Mexican troops retreated to Béxar. Six Mexican soldiers were killed and four were wounded. No Texians were injured.

A blue norther blew in on February 25, dropping the temperature to 39 °F (4 °C). Neither army was prepared for the cold temperatures. Texian attempts to gather firewood were thwarted by Mexican troops. On the evening of February 26, Colonel Juan Bringas engaged several Texians who were burning more huts. According to historian J.R. Edmondson, one Texian was killed. Four days later, Texians shot and killed Private First-Class Secundino Alvarez, a soldier from one of two battalions that Santa Anna had stationed on two sides of the Alamo. By March 1, the number of Mexican casualties was nine dead and four wounded, while the Texian garrison had lost only one man.

=== Reinforcements ===
I am determined to sustain myself as long as possible & die like a soldier who never forgets what is due to his own honor & that of his country. VICTORY OR DEATH.

— excerpt from William B. Travis's letter "To the People of Texas & All Americans in the World".

Santa Anna posted one company east of the Alamo, on the road to Gonzales. Almonte and 800 dragoons were stationed along the road to Goliad. Throughout the siege these towns had received multiple couriers, dispatched by Travis to plead for reinforcements and supplies. The most famous of his missives, written February 24, was addressed To the People of Texas & All Americans in the World.

According to historian Mary Deborah Petite, the letter is "considered by many as one of the masterpieces of American patriotism." Copies of the letter were distributed across Texas, and ultimately reprinted throughout the United States and much of Europe. At the end of the first day of the siege, Santa Anna's troops were reinforced by 600 men under General Joaquin Ramirez y Sesma, bringing the Mexican army up to more than 2,000 men.

As news of the siege spread throughout Texas, potential reinforcements gathered in Gonzales. They hoped to rendezvous with Colonel James Fannin, who was expected to arrive from Goliad with his garrison. On February 26, after days of indecision, Fannin ordered 320 men, four cannons, and several supply wagons to march towards the Alamo, 90 miles (140 km) away. This group traveled less than 1.0 mile (1.6 km) before turning back. Fannin blamed the retreat on his officers; the officers and enlisted men accused Fannin of aborting the mission.

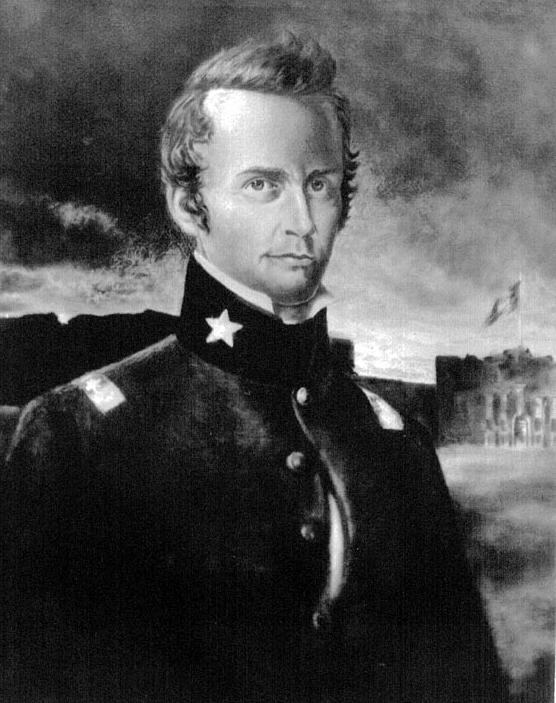
William B. Travis became sole Texian commander at the Alamo on February 24.

Texians gathered in Gonzales were unaware of Fannin's return to Goliad, and most continued to wait. Impatient with the delay, on February 27, Travis ordered Samuel G. Bastian to go to Gonzales "to hurry up reinforcements". According to historian Thomas Ricks Lindley, Bastian encountered the Gonzales Ranging Company led by Lieutenant George C. Kimble and Travis' courier to Gonzales, Albert Martin, who had tired of waiting for Fannin. A Mexican patrol attacked, driving off four of the men including Bastian. (Note: Colonel Juan Almonte's journal did not mention any skirmishes that evening. In 1837, Santa Anna's secretary Roman Martinez Caro did report "two small reinforcements from Gonzales that succeeded in breaking through our lines and entering the fort. The first consisted of four men who gained the fort one night, and the second was a party of twenty-five." (Lindley (2003), p. 131.)) In the darkness, the Texians fired on the remaining 32 men, whom they assumed were Mexican soldiers. One man was wounded, and his English curses convinced the occupiers to open the gates. (Note: These Texian reinforcements were later dubbed the Immortal 32.)

On March 3, the Texians watched from the walls as approximately 1,000 Mexicans marched into Béxar. The Mexican army celebrated loudly throughout the afternoon, both in honor of their reinforcements and at the news that troops under General José de Urrea had soundly defeated Texian Colonel Frank W. Johnson at the Battle of San Patricio Most of the Texians in the Alamo believed that Sesma had been leading the Mexican forces during the siege, and they mistakenly attributed the celebration to the arrival of Santa Anna. The reinforcements brought the number of Mexican soldiers in Béxar to almost 3,100.

The arrival of the Mexican reinforcements prompted Travis to send three men, including Davy Crockett, to find Fannin's force, which he still believed to be in route. The scouts discovered a large group of Texians were camped 20 miles (32 km) away from the Alamo. Lindley's research indicates that up to 50 of these men had come from Goliad after Fannin's aborted rescue mission. The others had left Gonzales several days earlier. Just before daylight on March 4, part of the Texian force broke through Mexican lines and entered the Alamo. Mexican soldiers drove a second group across the prairie. (Note: Almonte's journal reported that there was an engagement that night, but that the Mexican troops had repulsed the assault. (Lindley (2003), p. 143.))

=== Assault preparations ===
Legend holds that at some point on March 5, Travis gathered his men and explained that an attack was imminent, and that they were greatly outnumbered by the Mexican Army. He supposedly drew a line in the ground and asked those willing to die for the Texian cause to cross and stand alongside him; only one man (Moses Rose) was said to have declined. Most scholars disregard this account because there is no primary source evidence to support it (the story only surfaced decades after the battle in a third-hand account).

At some point, prior to the final assault, Travis reportedly assembled a conference to inform the men of their dire situation and gave them the chance to escape, stay, or die for the cause. Susanna Dickinson recalled Travis announcing that any men who wished to escape should let it be known and step out of ranks. Hardin says: "Reliable Mexican accounts, however, suggest a different story."

On March 4 (according to Todish) or March 5 (according to Hardin), Santa Anna proposed an assault on the Alamo. Some senior officers recommended that they wait for two 12-pounder cannons anticipated to arrive around March 7. Mexican Lieutenant Colonel de la Peña wrote that Travis' men had been "urging him to surrender" and "on the 5th he promised them that if no help arrived on that day they would surrender the next day or would try to escape under the cover of darkness." De la Peña's sources were a woman from San Antonio, Travis' slave Ben, and women who had remained inside the Alamo.

Mexican General Vicente Filisola also noted that Travis, through a female intermediary, proposed a surrender that would spare their lives, but Santa Anna would only accept unconditional surrender.

During the assault, Santa Anna arranged for troops from Béxar to be excused from the front lines so that they would not be forced to fight their own families.

The last Texian verified to have left the Alamo was James Allen, a courier who carried personal messages from Travis and several of the other men on March 5.

== Final assault ==
=== Exterior fighting ===
Initial Mexican troop deployment
Commander	Troops	Equipment
Cos	350	10 ladders 2 crowbars 2 axes
Duque/Castrillón	400	10 ladders
Romero	400	6 ladders
Morales	125	2 ladders
Sesma	500 cavalry	
Santa Anna	400 reserves	

At 10 p.m. on March 5, the Mexican artillery ceased their bombardment. As Santa Anna had anticipated, the exhausted Texians soon fell into the first uninterrupted sleep many of them had since the siege began. Just after midnight, more than 2,000 Mexican soldiers began preparing for the final assault. Fewer than 1,800 were divided into four columns, commanded by Cos, Colonel Francisco Duque, Colonel José María Romero and Colonel Juan Morales. Veterans were positioned on the outside of the columns to better control the new recruits and conscripts in the middle. As a precaution, 500 Mexican cavalry were positioned around the Alamo to prevent the escape of either Texian or Mexican soldiers. Santa Anna remained in camp with the 400 reserves. Despite the bitter cold, the soldiers were ordered not to wear overcoats which could impede their movements. Clouds concealed the moon and thus the movements of the soldiers.

At 5:30 a.m. troops silently advanced. Cos and his men approached the northwest corner of the Alamo, while Duque led his men from the northwest towards a repaired breach in the Alamo's north wall. The column commanded by Romero marched towards the east wall, and Morales's column aimed for the low parapet by the church.

The three Texian sentinels stationed outside the walls were killed in their sleep, allowing Mexican soldiers to approach undetected within musket range of the walls. At this point, the silence was broken by shouts of "¡Viva Santa Anna!" and music from the buglers. The noise woke the Texians. Most of the noncombatants gathered in the church sacristy for safety. Travis rushed to his post yelling, "Come on boys, the Mexicans are upon us and we'll give them hell!" and, as he passed a group of Tejanos, "¡No rendirse, muchachos!" ("Don't surrender, boys").

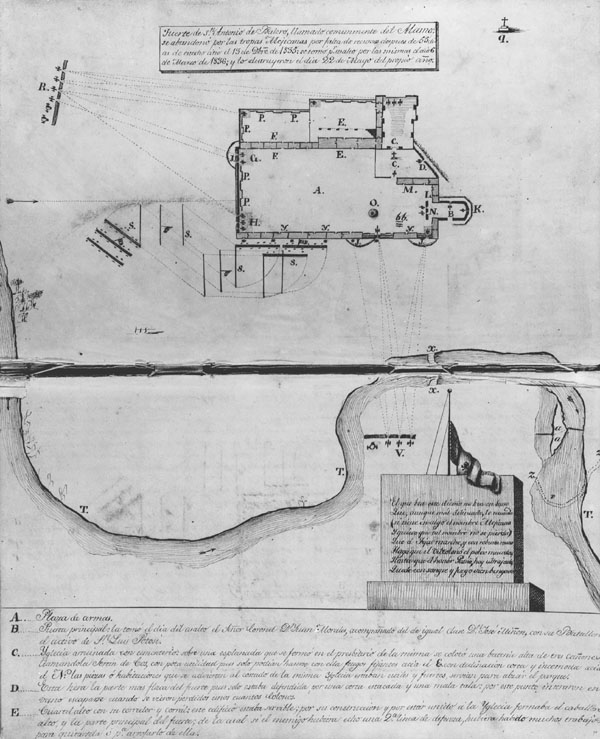
This plan of the Alamo was created by José Juan Sánchez Navarro in 1836. Places marked R and V denote Mexican cannon; position S indicates Cos's forces.

In the initial moments of the assault, Mexican troops were at a disadvantage. Their column formation allowed only the front rows of soldiers to fire safely. Unaware of the dangers, the untrained recruits in the ranks "blindly fir[ed] their guns", injuring or killing the troops in front of them. The tight concentration of troops also offered an excellent target for the Texian artillery. Lacking canister shot, Texians filled their cannon with any metal they could find, including door hinges, nails, and chopped-up horseshoes, essentially turning the cannon into giant shotguns. According to the diary of José Enrique de la Peña, "a single cannon volley did away with half the company of chasseurs from Toluca". Duque fell from his horse after sustaining a wound in his thigh and was almost trampled by his own men. General Manuel Castrillón quickly assumed command of Duque's column.

Although some in the front of the Mexican ranks wavered, soldiers in the rear pushed them on. As the troops massed against the walls, Texians were forced to lean over the walls to shoot, leaving them exposed to Mexican fire. Travis became one of the first occupiers to die, shot while firing his shotgun into the soldiers below him, though one source says that he drew his sword and stabbed a Mexican officer who had stormed the wall before succumbing to his injury. Few of the Mexican ladders reached the walls. The few soldiers who were able to climb the ladders were quickly killed or beaten back. As the Texians discharged their previously loaded rifles, they found it increasingly difficult to reload while attempting to keep Mexican soldiers from scaling the walls.

Mexican soldiers withdrew and regrouped, but their second attack was repulsed. Fifteen minutes into the battle, they attacked a third time. During the third strike, Romero's column, aiming for the east wall, was exposed to cannon fire and shifted to the north, mingling with the second column. Cos' column, under fire from Texians on the west wall, also veered north. When Santa Anna saw that the bulk of his army was massed against the north wall, he feared a rout; "panicked", he sent the reserves into the same area. The Mexican soldiers closest to the north wall realized that the makeshift wall contained many gaps and toeholds. One of the first to scale the 12-foot (3.7 m) wall was General Juan Amador; at his challenge, his men began swarming up the wall. Amador opened the postern in the north wall, allowing Mexican soldiers to pour into the complex. Others climbed through gun ports in the west wall, which had few occupiers. As the Texian occupiers abandoned the north wall and the northern end of the west wall, Texian gunners at the south end of the mission turned their cannon towards the north and fired into the advancing Mexican soldiers. This left the south end of the mission unprotected; within minutes Mexican soldiers had climbed the walls and killed the gunners, gaining control of the Alamo's 18-pounder cannon. By this time Romero's men had taken the east wall of the compound and were pouring in through the cattle pen.

=== Interior fighting ===
Great God, Sue, the Mexicans are inside our walls! If they spare you, save my child

— Last words of Texian defender Almaron Dickinson to his wife Susanna as he prepared to defend the church.

As previously planned, most of the Texians fell back to the barracks and the church. Holes had been carved in the walls to allow the Texians to fire. Unable to reach the barracks, Texians stationed along the west wall headed west for the San Antonio River. When the cavalry charged, the Texians took cover and began firing from a ditch. Sesma was forced to send reinforcements, and the Texians were eventually killed. Sesma reported that this skirmish involved 50 Texians, but Edmondson believes that number was inflated.

The occupiers in the cattle pen retreated into the horse corral. After discharging their weapons, the small band of Texians scrambled over the low wall, circled behind the church and raced on foot for the east prairie, which appeared empty. As the Mexican cavalry advanced on the group, Almaron Dickinson and his artillery crew turned a cannon around and fired into the cavalry, probably inflicting casualties. Nevertheless, all of the escaping Texians were killed.

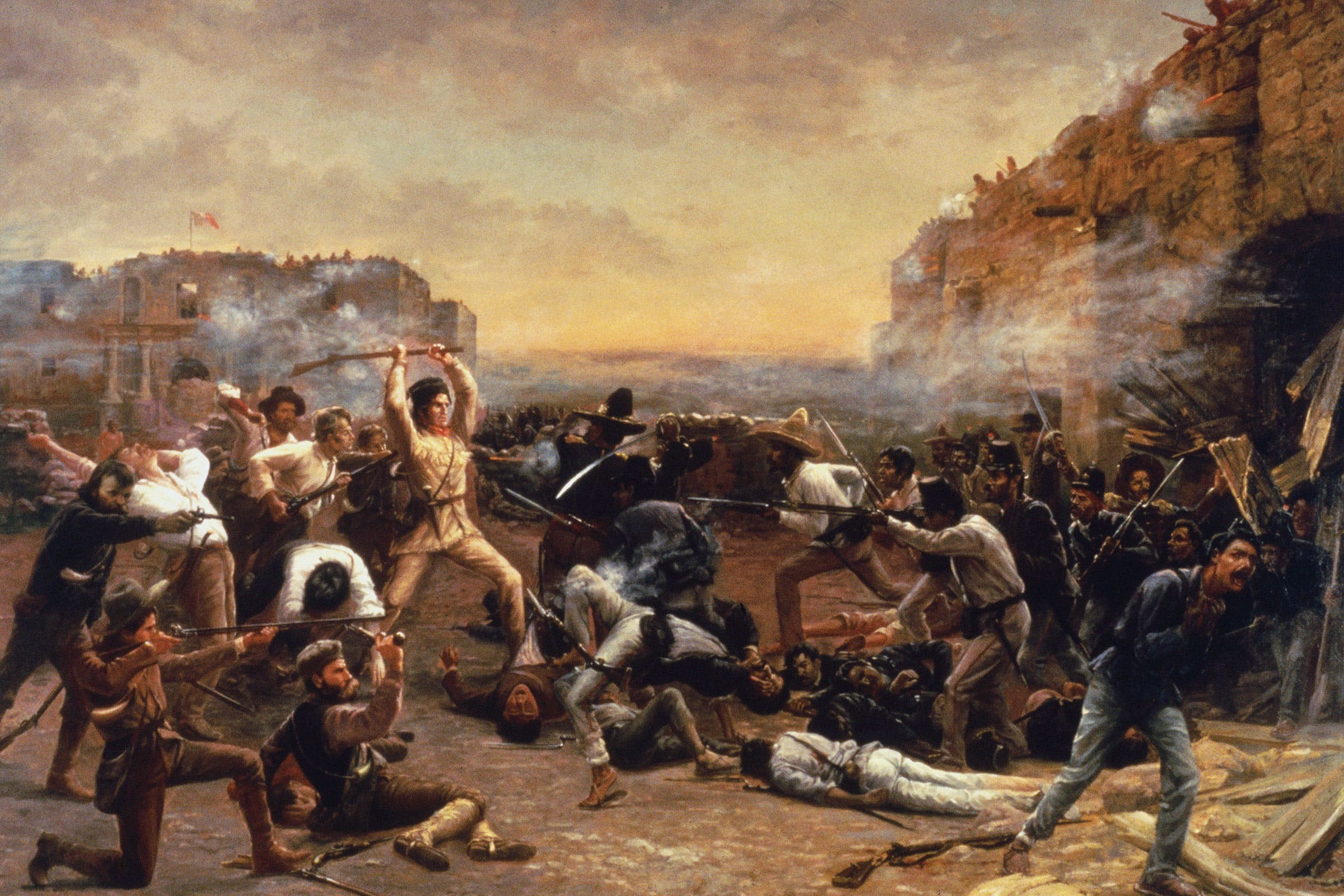
The Fall of the Alamo (1903) by Robert Jenkins Onderdonk, depicts Davy Crockett wielding his rifle as a club against Mexican troops who have breached the walls of the mission.

The last Texian group to remain in the open were Crockett and his men, defending the low wall in front of the church. Unable to reload, they used their rifles as clubs and fought with knives. After a volley of fire and a wave of Mexican bayonets, the few remaining Texians in this group fell back towards the church. The Mexican army now controlled all of the outer walls and the interior of the Alamo compound except for the church and rooms along the east and west walls. Mexican soldiers turned their attention to a Texian flag waving from the roof of one building. Four Mexicans were killed before the flag of Mexico was raised in that location. (Note: Lieutenant José Maria Torres is credited with successfully raising the Mexican flag; he was mortally wounded in the process. (Todish et al. (1998), p. 54.))

For the next hour, the Mexican army worked to secure complete control of the Alamo. Many of the remaining occupiers were ensconced in the fortified barracks rooms. In the confusion, the Texians had neglected to spike their cannon before retreating. Mexican soldiers turned the cannon towards the barracks. As each door was blown off, Mexican soldiers would fire a volley of muskets into the dark room, then charge in for hand-to-hand combat.

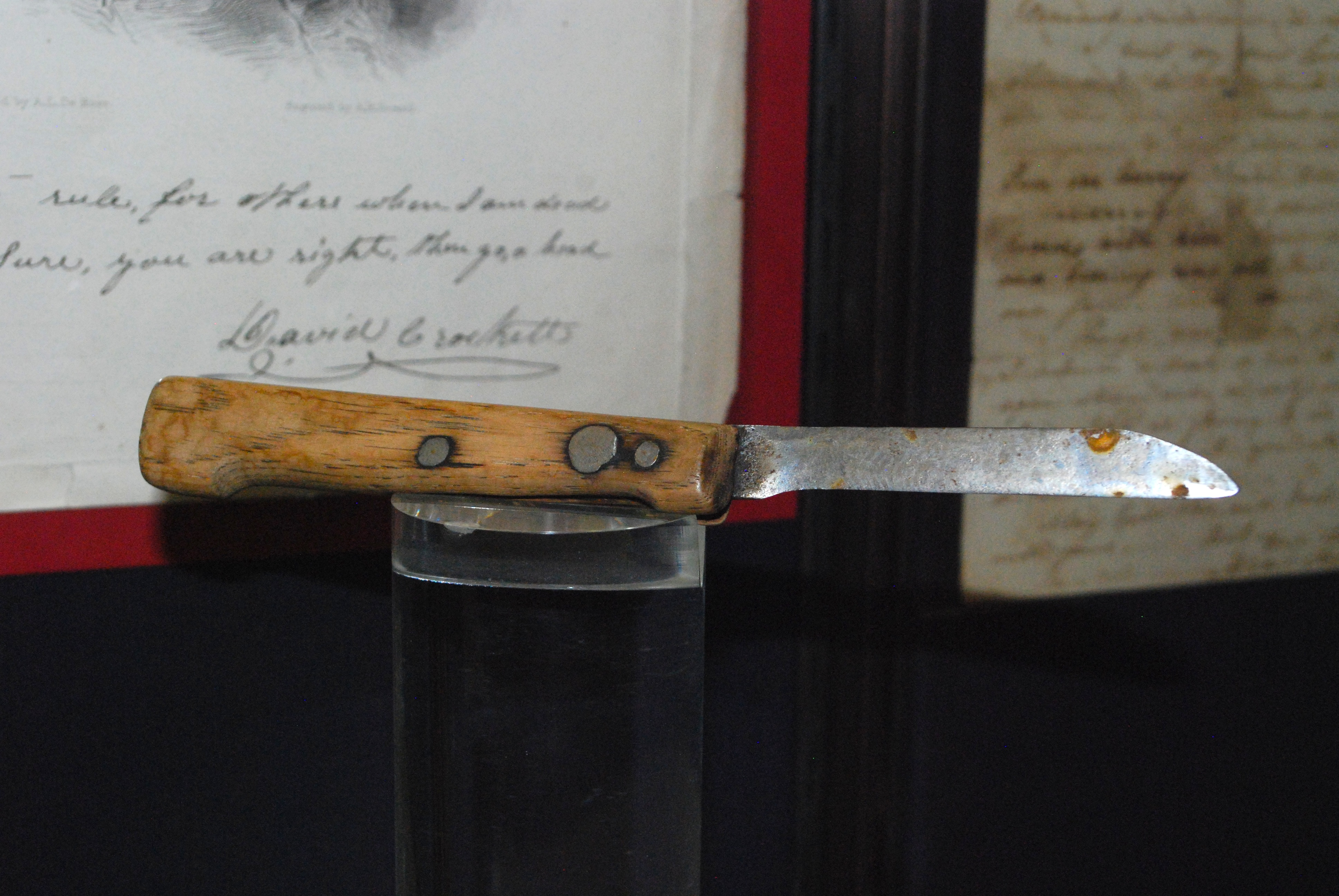
A knife purportedly carried by Davy Crockett during the Battle of the Alamo

Too sick to participate in the battle, Bowie likely died in bed. Eyewitnesses to the battle gave conflicting accounts of his death. Some witnesses maintained that they saw several Mexican soldiers enter Bowie's room, bayonet him, and carry him alive from the room. Others claimed that Bowie shot himself or was killed by soldiers while too weak to lift his head. According to historian Wallace Chariton, the "most popular, and probably the most accurate" version is that Bowie died on his cot, "back braced against the wall, and using his pistols and his famous knife."

The last of the Texians to die were the 11 men manning the two 12-pounder cannons in the church. A shot from the 18-pounder cannon destroyed the barricades at the front of the church, and Mexican soldiers entered the building after firing an initial musket volley. Dickinson's crew fired their cannon from the apse into the Mexican soldiers at the door. With no time to reload, the Texians, including Dickinson, Gregorio Esparza and James Bonham, grabbed rifles and fired before being bayoneted to death. Texian Robert Evans, the master of ordnance, had been tasked with keeping the gunpowder from falling into Mexican hands. Wounded, he crawled towards the powder magazine but was killed by a musket ball with his torch only inches from the powder. Had he succeeded, the blast would have destroyed the church and killed the women and children hiding in the sacristy.

As soldiers approached the sacristy, one of the young sons of occupier Anthony Wolf stood to pull a blanket over his shoulders. In the dark, Mexican soldiers mistook him for an adult and killed him. (Note: According to Edmondson, Wolf then ran into the room, grabbed his remaining son, and leaped with the child from the cannon ramp at the rear of the church; both were killed by musket shots before hitting the ground. (Edmondson (2000), p. 372.)) Possibly the last Texian to die in battle was Jacob Walker, who, wounded, ran to a corner and was bayoneted in front of Susanna Dickinson. Another Texian, Brigido Guerrero, also sought refuge in the sacristy. Guerrero, who had deserted from the Mexican Army in December 1835, was spared after convincing the soldiers he was a Texian prisoner.

By 6:30 a.m. the battle for the Alamo was over. Mexican soldiers inspected each corpse, bayoneting any body that moved. Even with all of the Texians dead, Mexican soldiers continued to shoot, some killing each other in the confusion. Mexican generals were unable to stop the bloodlust and appealed to Santa Anna for help. Although the general showed himself, the violence continued and the buglers were finally ordered to sound a retreat. For 15 minutes after that, soldiers continued to fire into dead bodies.

== Aftermath ==
=== Casualties ===
According to many accounts of the battle, between five and seven Texians surrendered. (Note: Edmondson speculates that these men might have been sick or wounded and were therefore unable to fight. (Edmondson (2000), p. 373)) Incensed that his orders had been ignored, Santa Anna demanded the immediate execution of the survivors. Weeks after the battle, stories circulated that Crockett was among those who surrendered. Ben, a former United States slave who cooked for one of Santa Anna's officers, maintained that Crockett's body was found surrounded by "no less than sixteen Mexican corpses". Historians disagree on which version of Crockett's death is accurate. (Note: According to Petite, "Every account of the Crockett surrender-execution story comes from an avowed antagonist (either on political or military grounds) of Santa Anna's. It is believed that many stories, such as the surrender and execution of Crockett, were created and spread in order to discredit Santa Anna and add to his role as villain." (Petite (1999), p. 124.))

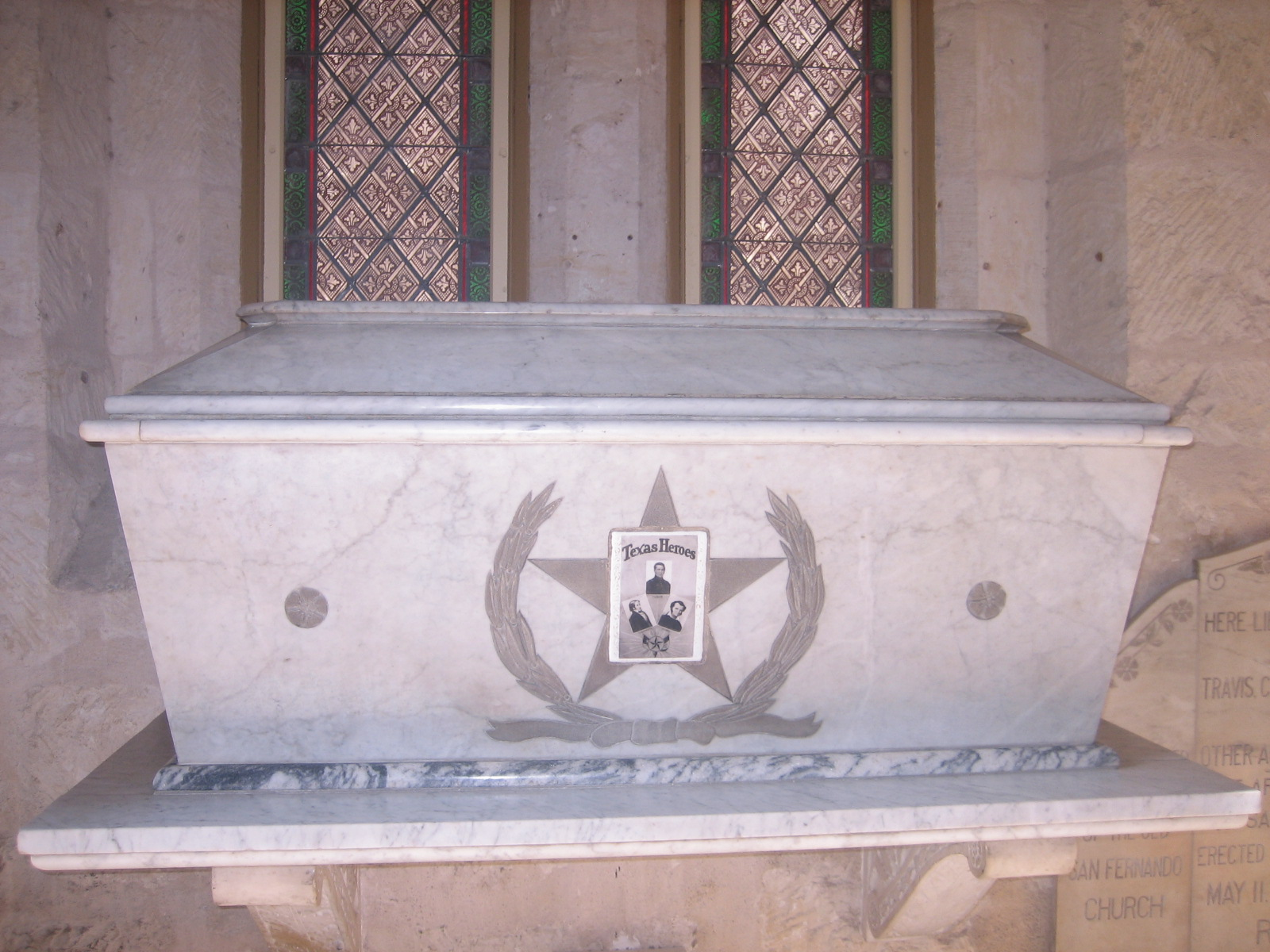
A sarcophagus in the San Fernando Cathedral that is purported to hold the ashes of the Alamo occupiers. Historians believe it is more likely that the ashes were buried near the Alamo.

Santa Anna reportedly told Captain Fernando Urizza that the battle "was but a small affair". Another officer then remarked that "with another such victory as this, we'll go to the devil". (Note: The identity of this officer is disputed. Edmondson claims that this remark was made by Colonel Juan Almonte and overheard by Almonte's cook, Ben. (Edmondson (2000), p. 374.) Todish attributes the remark to Lieutenant Colonel José Juan Sanchez-Navarro. (Todish et al. (1998), p. 55.)) In his initial report Santa Anna claimed that 600 Texians had been killed, with only 70 Mexican soldiers killed and 300 wounded. His secretary, Ramón Martínez Caro, reported 400 killed. Other estimates of the number of Mexican soldiers killed ranged from 60 to 200, with an additional 250–300 wounded. Some people, historians, and survivors such as Susanna Dickinson have estimated that over 1,000-1,600 Mexican soldiers were killed and wounded, but it is most likely that total casualties were less than 600. Texian Dr. J. H. Barnard who tended the Mexican soldiers reported 300-400 dead and 200-300 wounded. Most Alamo historians place the number of Mexican casualties at 400–600. This would represent about one quarter of the over 2,000 Mexican soldiers involved in the final assault, which Todish remarks is "a tremendous casualty rate by any standards". Most eyewitnesses counted between 182 and 257 Texians killed. Some historians believe that at least one Texian, Henry Warnell, successfully escaped from the battle. Warnell died several months later of wounds incurred either during the final battle or during his escape as a courier.

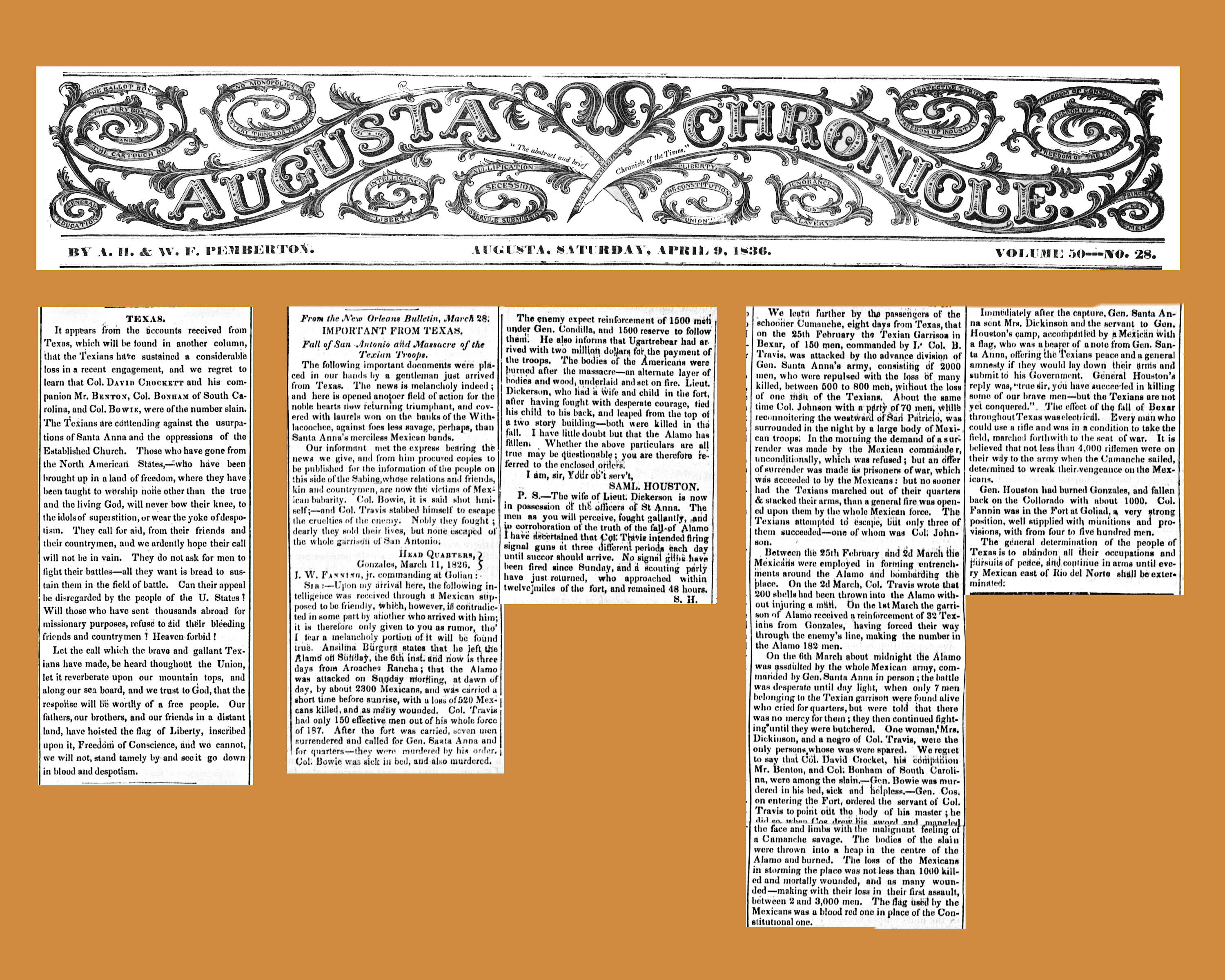
Detailed news of the battle sometimes took weeks to reach publication in the East, such as these April 9 columns in a Georgia newspaper.

Mexican soldiers were buried in the local cemetery, Campo Santo. (Note: According to Francisco Ruiz, possibly the alcalde of Béxar, the graveyard was near full and that he instead threw some of the corpses in the river. (Edmondson (2000), p. 374.) Sam Houston reported on March 13 that all Mexicans were buried. (Lindley (2003), p. 277.)) Shortly after the battle, Colonel José Juan Sanchez Navarro proposed that a monument should be erected to the fallen Mexican soldiers. Cos rejected the idea.

The Texian bodies were stacked and burned. (Note: Cremating bodies was anathema at the time, as most Christians believed that a body could not be resurrected unless it were whole. (Petite (1999), p. 139.)) The only exception was the body of Gregorio Esparza. His brother Francisco, an officer in Santa Anna's army, received permission to give Gregorio a proper burial. The ashes were left where they fell until February 1837, when Juan Seguín returned to Béxar to examine the remains. A simple coffin inscribed with the names Travis, Crockett, and Bowie was filled with ashes from the funeral pyres. According to a March 28, 1837, article in the Telegraph and Texas Register, Seguín buried the coffin under a peach tree grove. The spot was not marked and remains unidentified. Seguín later claimed that he had placed the coffin in front of the altar at the San Fernando Cathedral. In July 1936 a coffin was discovered buried in that location, but according to historian Wallace Chariton, it is unlikely to actually contain the remains of the Alamo defenders. Fragments of uniforms were found in the coffin, and the Texian soldiers who fought at the Alamo were known not to wear uniforms.

=== Texian survivors ===
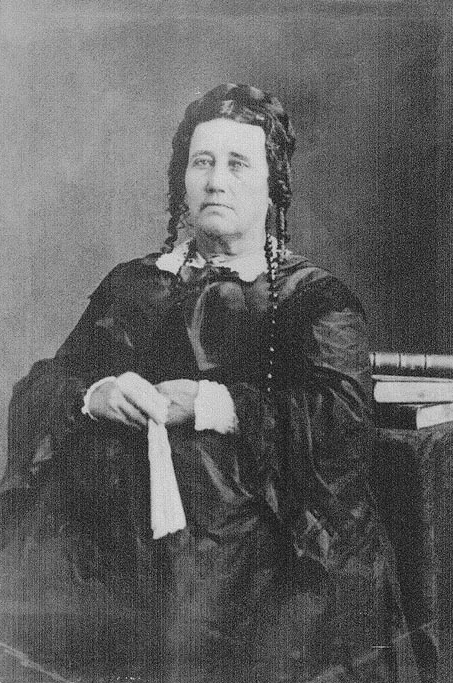
Susanna Dickinson survived the Battle of the Alamo. Santa Anna sent her to spread word of the Texian defeat to the Texas colonists.

In an attempt to convince other slaves in Texas to support the Mexican government over the Texian rebellion, Santa Anna spared Travis' slave, Joe. The day after the battle, he interviewed each noncombatant individually. Impressed with Susanna Dickinson, Santa Anna offered to adopt her infant daughter Angelina and have the child educated in Mexico City. Dickinson refused the offer, which was not extended to Juana Navarro Alsbury although her son was of similar age. Each woman was given a blanket and two silver pesos. Alsbury and the other Tejano women were allowed to return to their homes in Béxar; Dickinson, her daughter and Joe were sent to Gonzales, escorted by Ben. They were encouraged to relate the events of the battle, and to inform the remainder of the Texian forces that Santa Anna's army was unbeatable.

=== Impact on revolution ===
During the siege, newly elected delegates from across Texas met at the Convention of 1836. On March 2, the delegates declared independence, forming the Republic of Texas. Four days later, the delegates at the convention received a dispatch Travis had written March 3 warning of his dire situation. Unaware that the Alamo had fallen, Robert Potter called for the convention to adjourn and march immediately to relieve the Alamo. Sam Houston convinced the delegates to remain in Washington-on-the-Brazos to develop a constitution. After being appointed sole commander of all Texian troops, Houston journeyed to Gonzales to take command of the 400 volunteers who were still waiting for Fannin to lead them to the Alamo.

Within hours of Houston's arrival on March 11, Andres Barcenas and Anselmo Bergaras arrived with news that the Alamo had fallen and all Texians were slain. Hoping to halt a panic, Houston arrested the men as enemy spies. They were released hours later when Susanna Dickinson and Joe reached Gonzales and confirmed the report. Realizing that the Mexican army would soon advance towards the Texian settlements, Houston advised all civilians in the area to evacuate and ordered his new army to retreat. This sparked a mass exodus, known as the Runaway Scrape, and most Texians, including members of the new government, fled east.

Despite their losses at the Alamo, the Mexican army in Texas still outnumbered the Texian army by almost six to one. Santa Anna assumed that knowledge of the disparity in troop numbers and the fate of the Texian soldiers at the Alamo would quell the resistance, and that Texian soldiers would quickly leave the territory. News of the Alamo's fall had the opposite effect, and men flocked to join Houston's army. The New York Post editorialized that "had [Santa Anna] treated the vanquished with moderation and generosity, it would have been difficult if not impossible to awaken that general sympathy for the people of Texas which now impels so many adventurous and ardent spirits to throng to the aid of their brethren".

On the afternoon of April 21 the Texian army attacked Santa Anna's camp near Lynchburg Ferry. The Mexican army was taken by surprise, and the Battle of San Jacinto was essentially over after 18 minutes. During the fighting, many of the Texian soldiers repeatedly cried "Remember the Alamo!" as they slaughtered fleeing Mexican troops. Santa Anna was captured the following day, and reportedly told Houston: "That man may consider himself born to no common destiny who has conquered the Napoleon of the West. And now it remains for him to be generous to the vanquished." Houston replied, "You should have remembered that at the Alamo". Santa Anna's life was spared, and he was forced to order his troops out of Texas, ending Mexican control of the province and bestowing some legitimacy on the new republic.

== Legacy ==
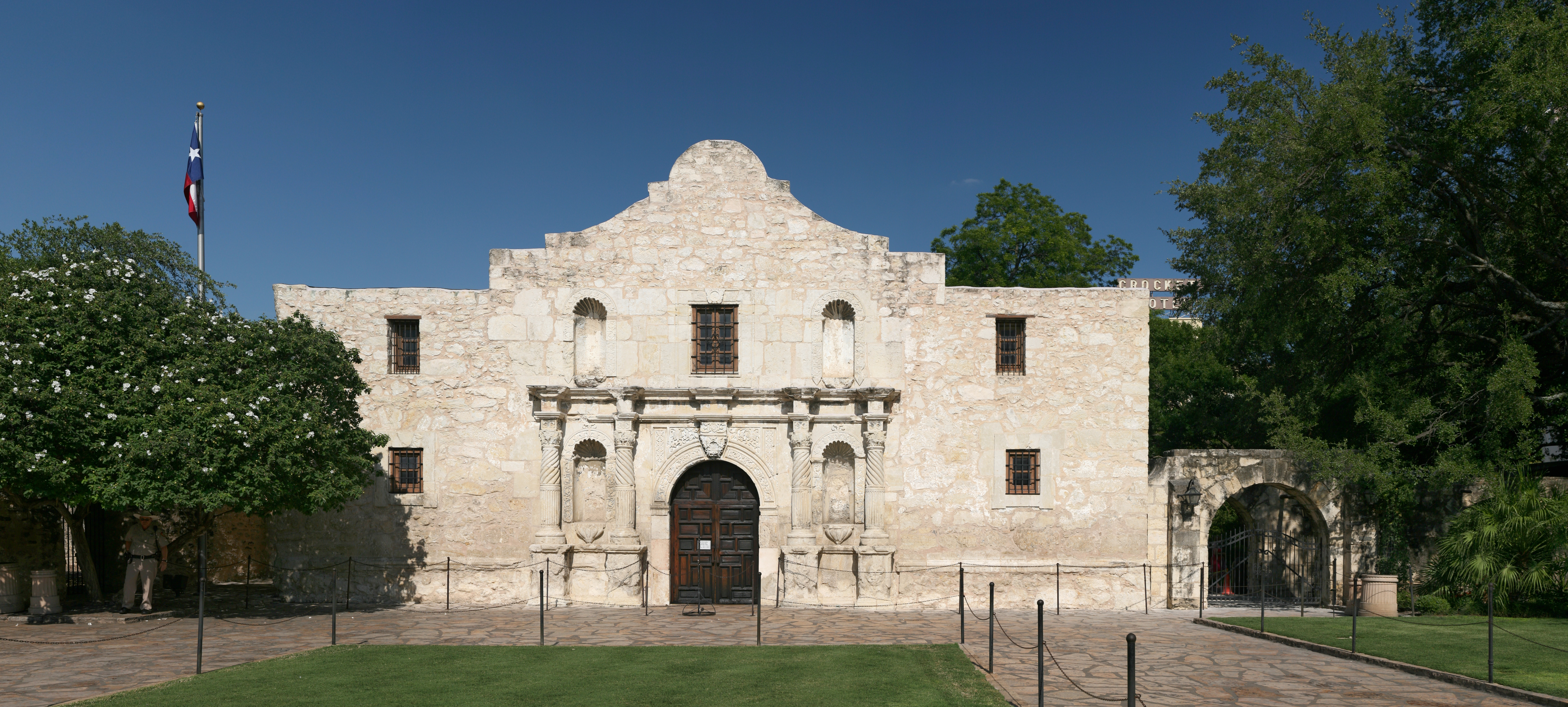
The restored Spanish colonial church of the Alamo as it appears today.

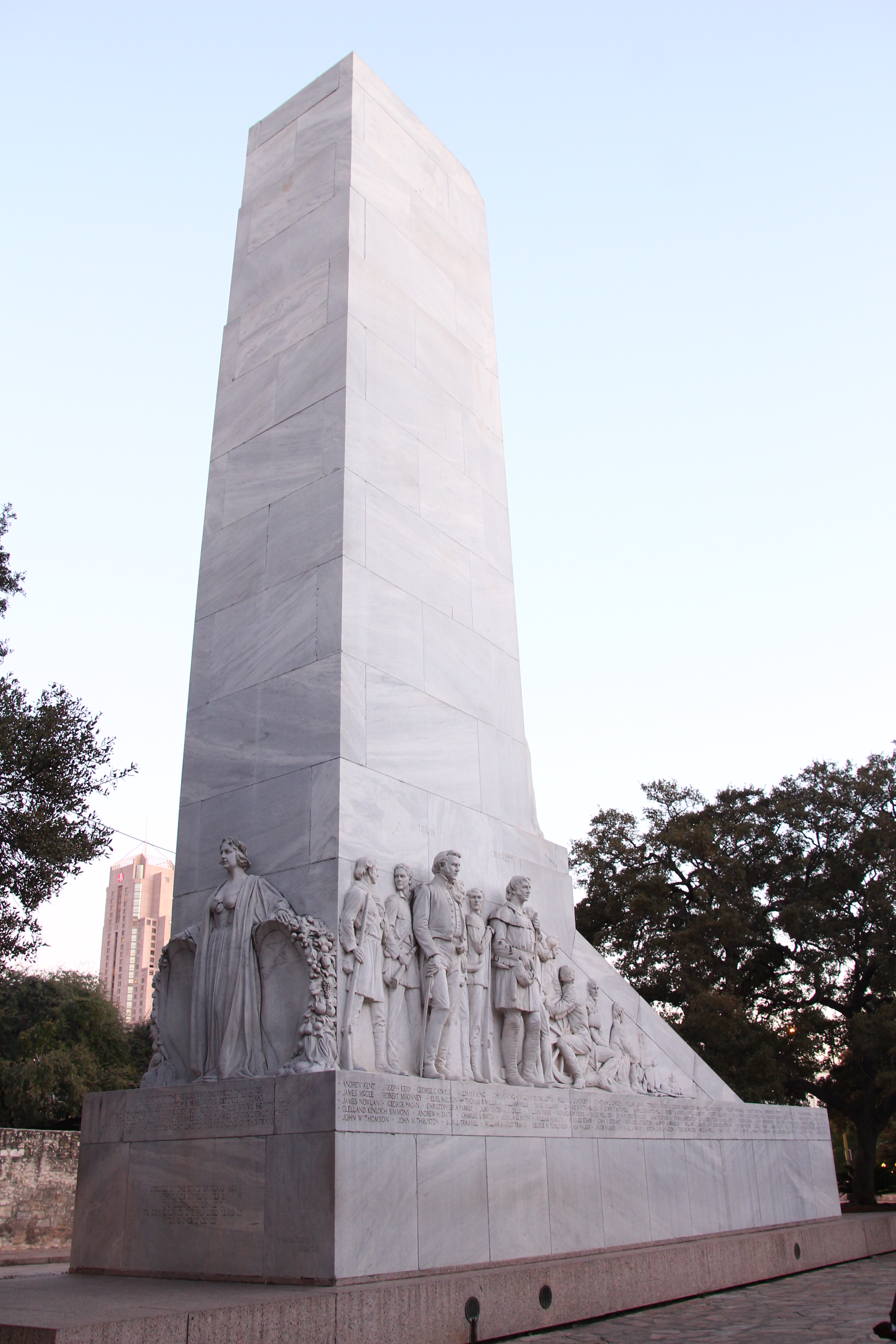
Cenotaph memorial of the Alamo defenders

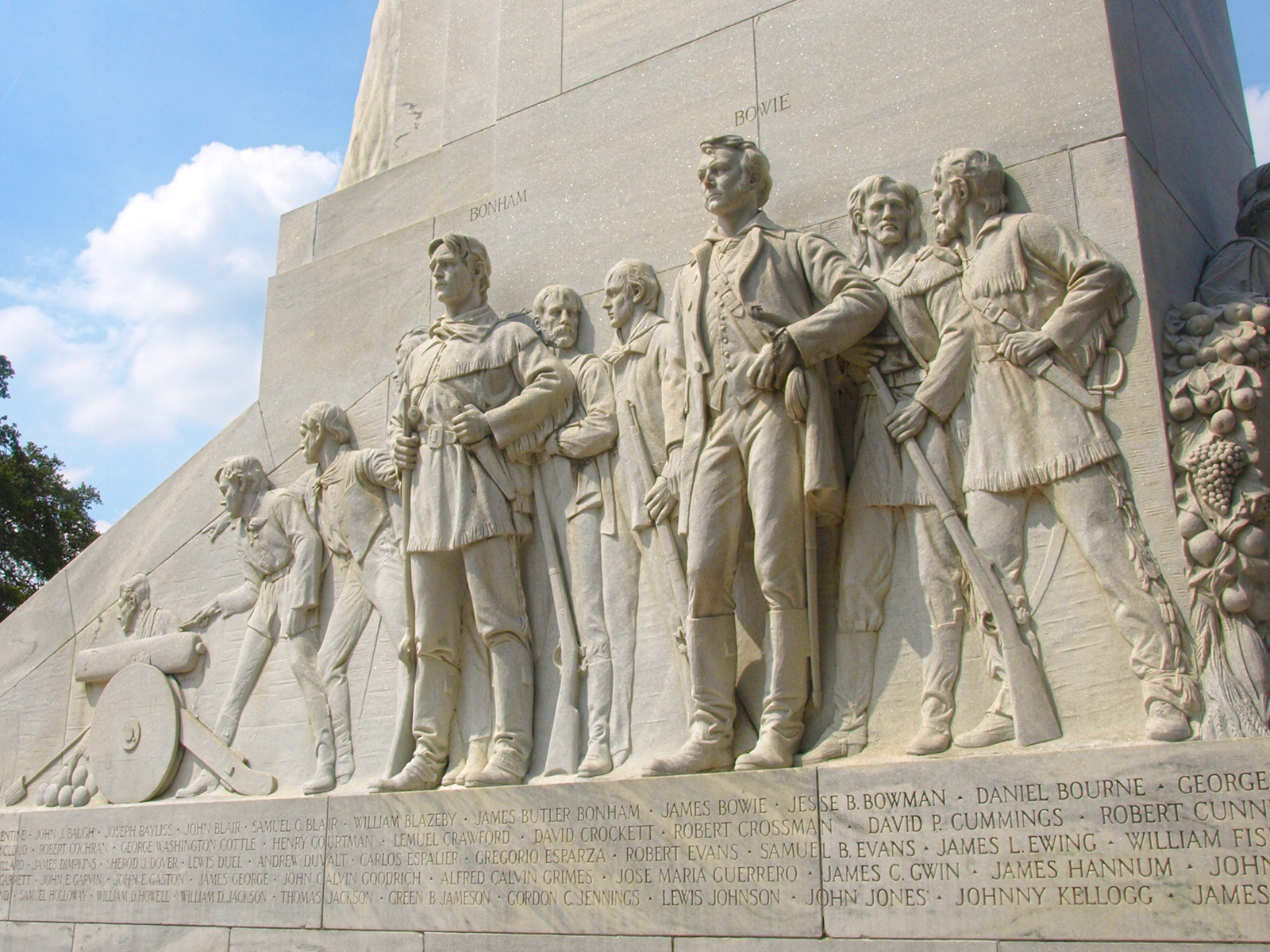
Closeup of the Alamo defenders

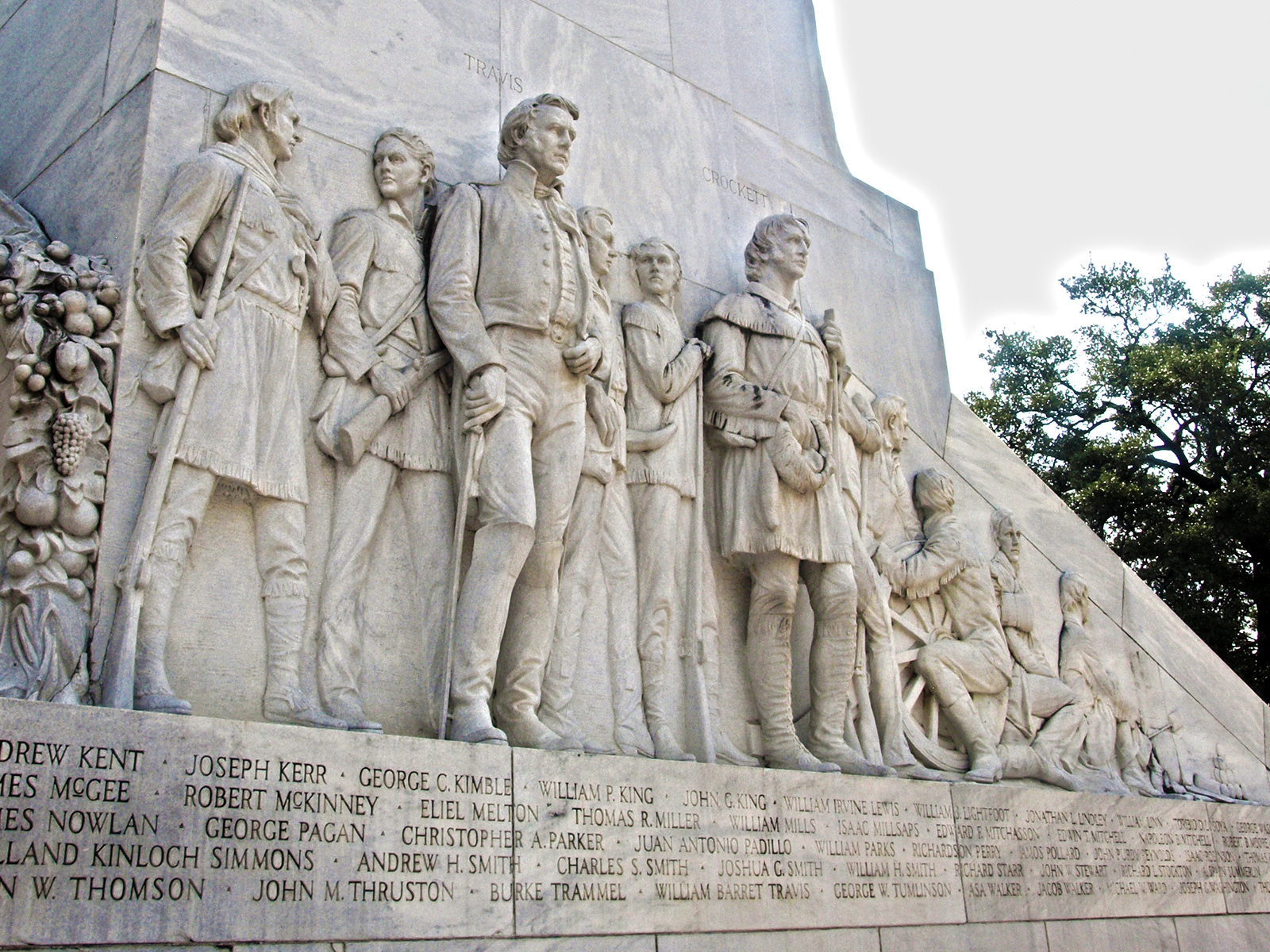
Closeup of the Alamo defenders

Following the battle, Santa Anna was alternately viewed as a national hero or a pariah. Mexican perceptions of the battle often mirrored the prevailing viewpoint. Santa Anna had been disgraced following his capture at the Battle of San Jacinto, and many Mexican accounts of the battle were written by men who had been, or had become, his outspoken critics. Petite and many other historians believe that some of the stories, such as the execution of Crockett, may have been invented to further discredit Santa Anna. In Mexican history, the Texas campaign, including the Battle of the Alamo, was soon overshadowed by the Mexican–American War of 1846–1848.

In San Antonio de Béxar, the largely Tejano population viewed the Alamo complex as more than just a battle site; it represented decades of assistance—as a mission, a hospital, or a military post. As the English-speaking population increased, the complex became best known for the battle. Focus has centered primarily on the Texian occupiers, with little emphasis given to the role of the Tejano soldiers who served in the Texian army or the actions of the Mexican army. In the early 20th century the Texas Legislature purchased the property and appointed the Daughters of the Republic of Texas as permanent caretakers of what is now an official state shrine. In front of the church, in the center of Alamo Plaza, stands a cenotaph, designed by Pompeo Coppini, which commemorates the Texians and Tejanos who died during the battle. According to Bill Groneman's Battlefields of Texas, the Alamo has become "the most popular tourist site in Texas".

The first English-language histories of the battle were written and published by Texas Ranger and amateur historian John Henry Brown. The next major treatment of the battle was Reuben Potter's The Fall of the Alamo, published in The Magazine of American History in 1878. Potter based his work on interviews with many of the Mexican survivors of the battle. The first full-length, non-fiction book covering the battle, John Myers Myers' The Alamo, was published in 1948. In the decades since, the battle has featured prominently in many non-fiction works.

According to Todish et al., "there can be little doubt that most Americans have probably formed many of their opinions on what occurred at the Alamo not from books, but from the various movies made about the battle." Stephen L. Hardin points out that contrary to "many movies and other works of fiction.... There is simply no evidence to support the notion that the sacrifice of the Alamo garrison allowed Houston to raise and train an army."

The first film version of the battle appeared in 1911, when Gaston Méliès directed The Immortal Alamo. The battle became more widely known after it was featured in the 1950s Disney miniseries Davy Crockett, which was largely based on myth. Within several years, John Wayne directed and starred in one of the best-known, though inaccurate, film versions, 1960's The Alamo. (Note: Historians J. Frank Dobie and Lon Tinkle requested that they not be listed as historical advisers in the credits of The Alamo because of its disjunction from recognized history. (Todish et al. (1998), p. 188.)) Another film also called The Alamo was released in 2004. CNN described it as possibly "the most character-driven of all the movies made on the subject". It is also considered more faithful to the actual events than other movies.

Several songwriters have been inspired by the Battle of the Alamo. Tennessee Ernie Ford's "The Ballad of Davy Crockett" spent 16 weeks on the country music charts, peaking at No. 4 in 1955. Marty Robbins recorded a version of the song "The Ballad of the Alamo" in 1960 which spent 13 weeks on the pop charts, peaking at No. 34. Jane Bowers' song "Remember the Alamo" has been recorded by artists including Johnny Cash, Willie Nelson, and Donovan. British hard rock band Babe Ruth's 1972 song "The Mexican" pictures the conflict through the eyes of a Mexican soldier. Singer-songwriter Phil Collins collected hundreds of items related to the battle, narrated a light and sound show about the Alamo, and has spoken at related events. In 2014 Collins donated his entire collection to the Alamo via the State of Texas.

The U.S. Postal Service issued two postage stamps in commemoration of Texas Statehood and the Battle of Alamo. The "Remember the Alamo" battle cry, as well as the Alamo Mission itself appear on the current version of the reverse side of the seal of Texas.

The battle also featured in episode 13 of The Time Tunnel, "The Alamo", first aired in 1966, and episode 5 of season one of the TV series Timeless, aired 2016.

As of 2023, the Alamo Trust (which operates the site) seeks to expand the property to build an Alamo museum. To do so, it would have to use eminent domain to seize a property containing an Alamo-themed bar called Moses Rose's Hideout (named after an Alamo deserter) that has operated for 12 years (circ. 2023). The Alamo Trust claims that if the bar owner continues to refuse to sell his property, it will put the $400 million property at stake. Conversely, the bar owner says that he wishes to participate in the economic success of adding an Alamo museum and that there is a certain unjust irony of seizing his property to expand the Alamo.

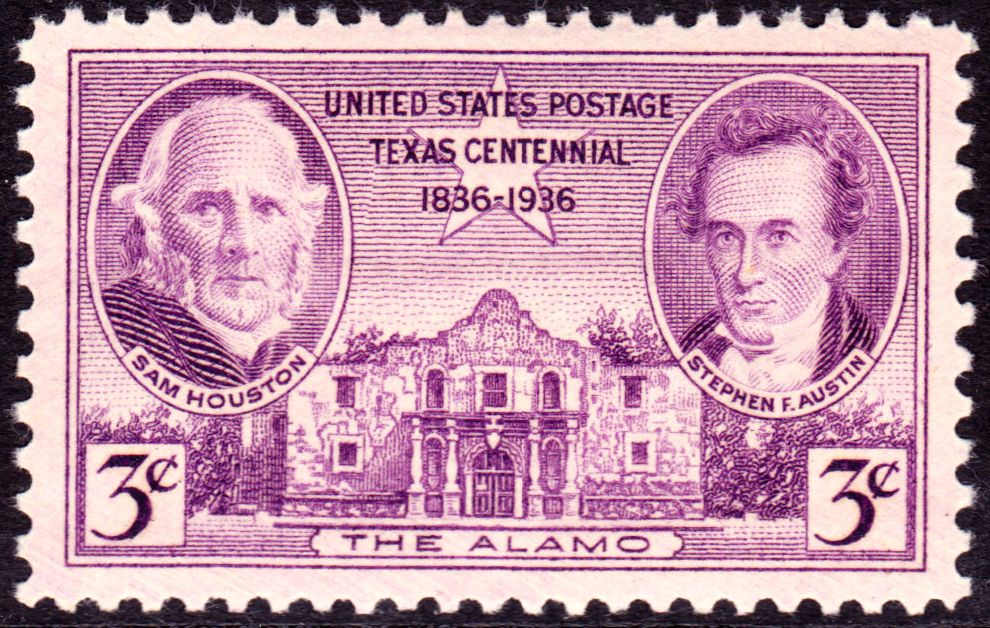
First stamp to commemorate battle was issued in 1936, the 100th anniversary of the battle, depicting Sam Houston and Stephen Austin.

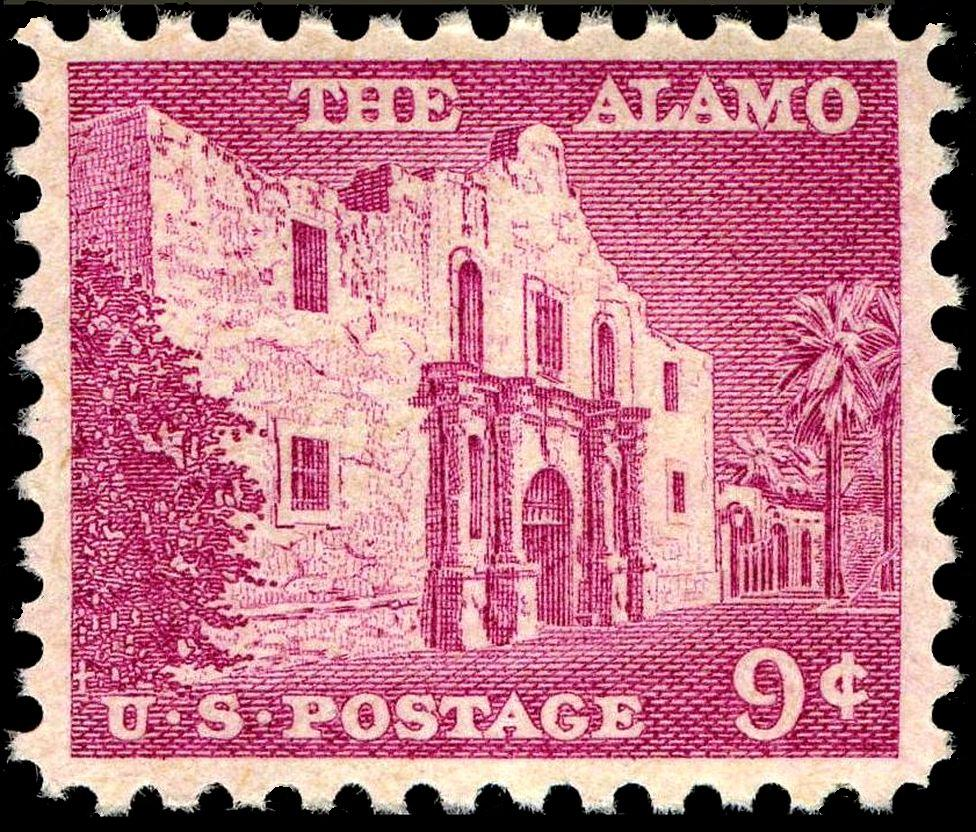
Second stamp, issued in 1956, depicts the facade of the Alamo mission.

The reverse of the current seal of Texas.

== See also ==
- Last stand
- List of Alamo defenders
- List of last stands
- List of Texas Revolution battles
- List of Texan survivors of the Battle of the Alamo

== General and cited references ==
- Barr, Alwyn (1990). Texans in Revolt: the Battle for San Antonio, 1835. Austin, TX: University of Texas Press. ISBN 978-0-292-77042-3. OCLC 20354408.
- Barr, Alwyn (1996). Black Texans: A history of African Americans in Texas, 1528–1995 (2nd ed.). Norman, OK: University of Oklahoma Press. ISBN 978-0-8061-2878-8.
- Chariton, Wallace O. (1990). Exploring the Alamo Legends. Dallas, TX: Republic of Texas Press. ISBN 978-1-55622-255-9.
- Chemerka, William H.; Wiener, Allen J. (2009). Music of the Alamo. Bright Sky Press. ISBN 978-1-933979-31-1.
- Cobler, Nicole (March 11, 2015). "Phil Collins' star rises over the Alamo". San Antonio Express-News.
- Cox, Mike (March 6, 1998). "Last of the Alamo big books rests with 'A Time to Stand'". The Austin-American Statesman.
- Culpepper, Andy (April 8, 2004). "A different take on 'The Alamo'". CNN.
- Edmondson, J.R. (2000). The Alamo Story-From History to Current Conflicts. Plano, TX: Republic of Texas Press. ISBN 978-1-55622-678-6.
- Edwards, Leigh H. (2009). Johnny Cash and the paradox of American identity. Indiana University Press. ISBN 978-0-253-35292-7.
- Groneman, Bill (1990). Alamo Defenders, A Genealogy: The People and Their Words. Austin, TX: Eakin Press. ISBN 978-0-89015-757-2.
- Groneman, Bill (1996). Eyewitness to the Alamo. Plano, TX: Republic of Texas Press. ISBN 978-1-55622-502-4.
- Groneman, Bill (1998). Battlefields of Texas. Plano, TX: Republic of Texas Press. ISBN 978-1-55622-571-0.
- Hardin, Stephen L. (1994). Texian Iliad. Austin, TX: University of Texas Press. ISBN 978-0-292-73086-1.
- Hardin, Stephen L. (June 9, 2010). "Battle of The Alamo". Handbook of Texas Online. Texas State Historical Association.
- Henson, Margaret Swett (1982). Juan Davis Bradburn: A Reappraisal of the Mexican Commander of Anahuac. College Station, TX: Texas A&M University Press. ISBN 978-0-89096-135-3.
- Hopewell, Clifford (1994). James Bowie Texas Fighting Man: A Biography. Austin, TX: Eakin Press. ISBN 978-0-89015-881-4.
- Lindley, Thomas Ricks (2003). Alamo Traces: New Evidence and New Conclusions. Lanham, MD: Republic of Texas Press. ISBN 978-1-55622-983-1.
- Lord, Walter (1961). A Time to Stand. Lincoln, NE: University of Nebraska Press. ISBN 978-0-8032-7902-5.
- Michels, Patrick (May 11, 2010). "Remembering the Alamo with Phil Collins". Dallas Observer. Archived from the original on April 29, 2015.
- Myers, John Myers (1948). The Alamo. Lincoln, NE: University of Nebraska Press. ISBN 978-0-8032-5779-5.
- Nofi, Albert A. (1992). The Alamo and the Texas War of Independence, September 30, 1835 to April 21, 1836: Heroes, Myths, and History. Conshohocken, PA: Combined Books, Inc. ISBN 978-0-938289-10-4.
- Petite, Mary Deborah (1999). 1836 Facts about the Alamo and the Texas War for Independence. Mason City, IA: Savas Publishing Company. ISBN 978-1-882810-35-2.
- Schoelwer, Susan Prendergast; Gläser, Tom W. (1985). Alamo Images: Changing Perceptions of a Texas Experience. Dallas, TX: The DeGlolyer Library and Southern Methodist University Press. ISBN 978-0-87074-213-2.
- Scott, Robert (2000). After the Alamo. Plano, TX: Republic of Texas Press. ISBN 978-1-55622-691-5.
- Tinkle, Lon (1985) [1958]. 13 Days to Glory: The Siege of the Alamo (Reprint: McGraw-Hill ed.). College Station, TX: Texas A&M University Press. ISBN 978-0-89096-238-1.
- Thompson, Frank (2001). The Alamo: A Cultural History. Dallas, TX: Taylor Trade. ISBN 9781461734352.
- Todish, Timothy J.; Todish, Terry; Spring, Ted (1998). Alamo Sourcebook, 1836: A Comprehensive Guide to the Battle of the Alamo and the Texas Revolution. Austin, TX: Eakin Press. ISBN 978-1-57168-152-2.
- N/A (July 21, 2014). "Phil Collins Press Conference". The Official Alamo Website. Archived from the original on September 28, 2014.
