= William R. Carey =

American volunteer soldier

William R. Carey was one of a group of American volunteer soldiers who went to the frontier territory of Texas in 1835 during the Texas Revolution against Mexico. He was born in Virginia in about 1806, the son of Moses Carey. He was killed in 1836 at the Battle of the Alamo.

Carey was the first Texas commander at the Alamo. Ranked as Captain, he commanded an artillery company at his own expense, which was dubbed "The Invincibles". He also fought at San Antonio de Béxar, and wrote a letter to his brother and sister in Virginia describing the events of that battle.

Carey was killed in the Alamo by the Mexican troops of Antonio López de Santa Anna.
