= Joe Travis =

Enslaved man (c.1815–??)

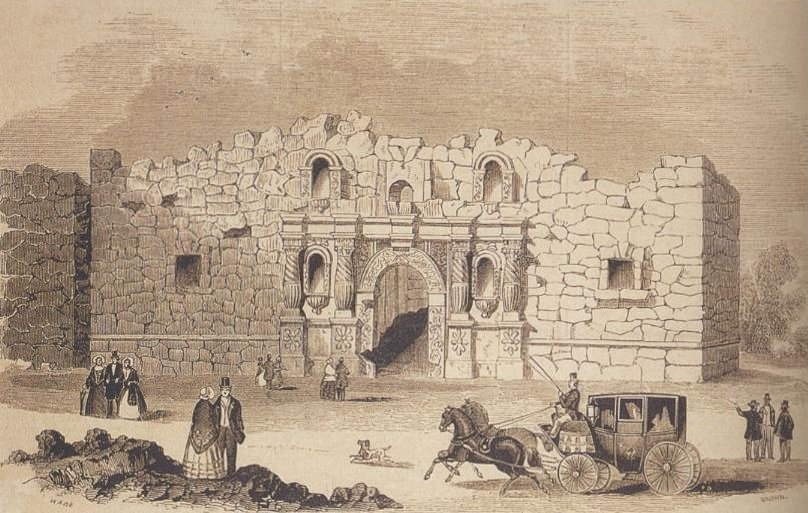
Alamo Mission in San Antonio

Joe Travis (c. 1815 – unknown) was an enslaved man who was one of the only survivors of the Battle of the Alamo. Joe was sold four times in his life, with his most well-known owner being William B. Travis, a 19th-century lawyer and soldier, who would later serve as one of the commanding officers at the Battle of the Alamo.

== Early life ==
Joe Travis was born in Lexington, Kentucky, in 1815, to his mother Elizabeth. He had five siblings, all of whom had different fathers. One of his siblings was abolitionist and novelist, William Wells Brown. Brown escaped enslavement in 1833 and is considered the first African American to publish a novel, titled Clotel, in 1853. Travis’ paternal grandfather was said to be Daniel Boone, famous pioneer and folk hero of the United States.

Travis grew up working in the fields with his family and often spent his free time fishing and hunting, or working extra jobs to save money to help his family. The owner of the farm, and Joe, was Dr. John Young. Young founded Marthasville, Missouri, where he would move Joe and the rest of his slaves. Joe would work as Young's farmhand until the age of 14, when he, his mother, his brother, and his sister, were sold to Isaac Mansfield, a businessman from Connecticut.

Joe lived in St. Louis, Missouri for several years before Mansfield decided to move to New Orleans in 1832. Mansfield would then move his family and slaves to Texas, which was part of Mexico at the time. Slavery was illegal in Mexican territories in the 1830s, so Joe and the other slaves were brought in, stating that they were indentured servants. Joe would be technically considered an indentured servant until Mansfield died in 1834. Joe was not granted his freedom when his master died. He and his family were sold to pay for Mansfield's debts, and Joe never saw any of his family members again.

== Life as William's B. Travis' Slave ==
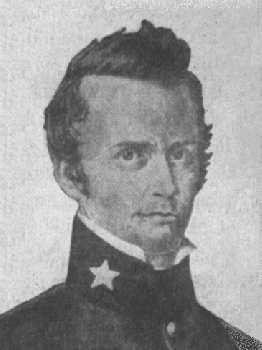
William B. Travis

Soon after Isaac Mansfield died, he was sold to William Barrett Travis, who was a lawyer and soldier in the United States military. Joe was then moved to Texas to live on Travis' plantation. By the time Travis owned Joe, he had also purchased a five-year-old boy named Jared, and also rented a slave named Peter. He also possibly owned a slave girl named Matilda, and eventually bought a slave couple named John and Kiz, who he would later sell together to John Rice Jones for $805, (~$26,487 in 2025) on May 29, 1835. Travis routinely bought or hired slaves, and sent them to work at friends properties, in order to make lease money.

Joe eventually became Travis' personal body servant and would prepare his clothes in the morning, saddle his mule, and drive Travis into town in his carriage.

In 1835, Travis was elected as Lieutenant Colonel to head the "Legion of Calvary", and was ordered, on December 25 of that year to the frontier to with all the troop he could gather. Joe went with Travis into the field.

== The Alamo ==
Joe and Travis arrived in San Antonio de Béxar on February 5, 1836. Antonio López de Santa Anna, Mexican politician and general, was known to be on his way with an army. The Alamo mission was lost by the Mexican army under General Cos' command two months prior to Joe's arrival. The damage to the mission due to that battle meant that troops were in short supply. The commander at the Alamo, Colonel Neill received word that his family was sick, so he decided to go home, leaving William B. Travis in charge. After all these setbacks, Travis then got word that Santa Anna's army was approaching days earlier than expected.

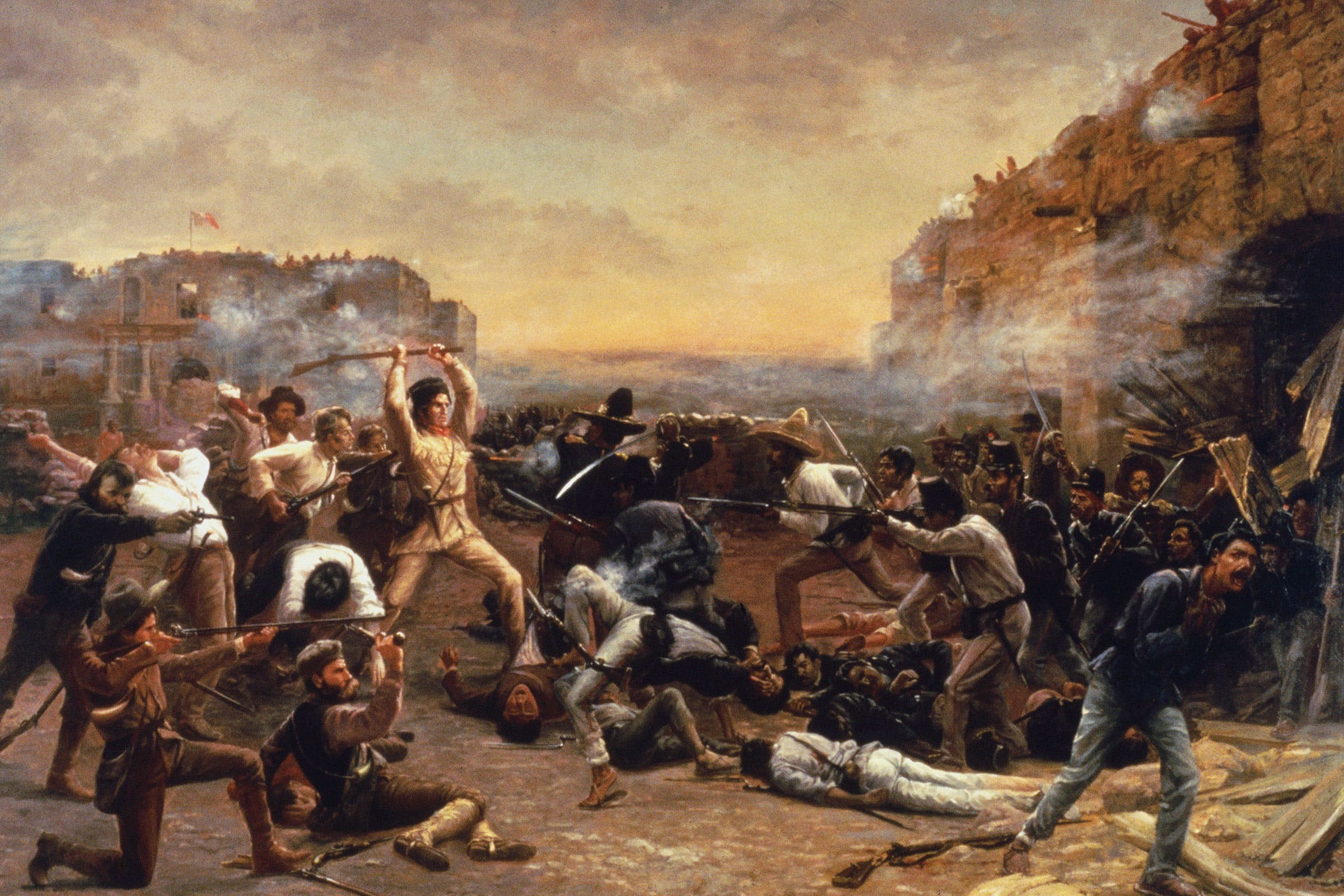
The Battle of the Alamo

On February 23, 1836, Mexican troops started rushing into San Antonio to squash the rebellion. Santa Anna rose a red flag to the top of the San Fernando bell tower, meaning to surrender, or no mercy would be given. Travis answered the red flag with a singular cannon shot. For the next thirteen days, Travis and his volunteers all lived in the Alamo mission, including Alamo legends Davy Crockett and James Bowie. During this time, Joe and Travis spent a lot of time in close quarters. On March 6, the two men were awoken by yelling, and grabbed their guns to line up at the wall of the mission.

Santa Anna's buglers began to blow "El Degüello", which was a calvary call that meant "cutthroat" or "behead". Joe, Travis, and the other volunteers began shooting Mexican soldiers down who were scaling the north wall. During this confrontation, Travis was shot in the temple. Joe retreated into a nearby house, and from a crack in the door, he watched his master die. From the house, Joe continued to fire shots at Mexican soldiers.

Finally, after the battle was over, Mexican soldiers came by the house and called out, asking, "are there any negroes here?", and Joe came out from the building. Two Mexican soldiers tried to kill Joe immediately, but Miguel Barragán, an officer for the Mexican army stopped them. Joe was asked to identify the bodies of Travis and Bowie, and was taken to Santa Anna, where Susanna Dickinson, another survivor of the Alamo also stood. Since Joe spoke Spanish, he was able to be questioned by Santa Anna about the state of the rebel army. After that, he was released.

== After the Alamo ==
Joe decided that he needed to leave San Antonio quickly, so he left the city and caught up with Susanna Dickinson, who was sent to Gonzales, Texas to tell Sam Houston about the mission. When Houston heard of what happened at the battle and that Santa Anna approaching, he had Gonzales burned to the ground, and everyone in the town left to head east.

Joe was treated as a war hero since he was the only known male to survive the battle. He went to Washington-on-the-Brazos to tell Charles Travis, William B. Travis' son, what happened at the mission. Despite his new fame as a war hero, Joe was then taken back to Travis' estate and put back into slavery, by his new master John Rice Jones.

One year after the battle of the Alamo, Joe escaped on two stolen horses, and made his way to a plantation owned by William B. Travis' brother, Nicholas Travis, outside of Sparta, Alabama. He was able to share with the rest of Travis' family about the battle. Joe is assumed to have stayed on their farm for at least 15 years. He was also possibly renamed "Ben" in the 1850s because Nicholas Travis' wife, Elizabeth, gave birth to a child named Joseph Mark Travis. Ben was the name of Joe's oldest brother who died when he was a child.

Joe was last seen in San Antonio in 1877, and not much is known about his life past then.

== Legacy ==
Joe was named a hero for his actions at the Battle of the Alamo, but was never rewarded a military pension for his service by the nation of Texas. Joe, The Slave Who Became an Alamo Legend, a book written by Ron J. Jackson and Lee Spencer White, was published in 2015 and shared a lot about the life of Joe and his contributions to the Alamo mission.

Joe's first-person account of the events of the Alamo is a significant testimony, as most other individuals partaking, died.

== Bibliography ==
- Jackson, Ron J.; White, Lee Spencer (2015). Joe, the Slave Who Became an Alamo Legend. University of Oklahoma Press. ISBN 9780806149608.
