= Siege of the Alamo =

Part of the Battle of the Alamo

- Part of the Texas Revolution
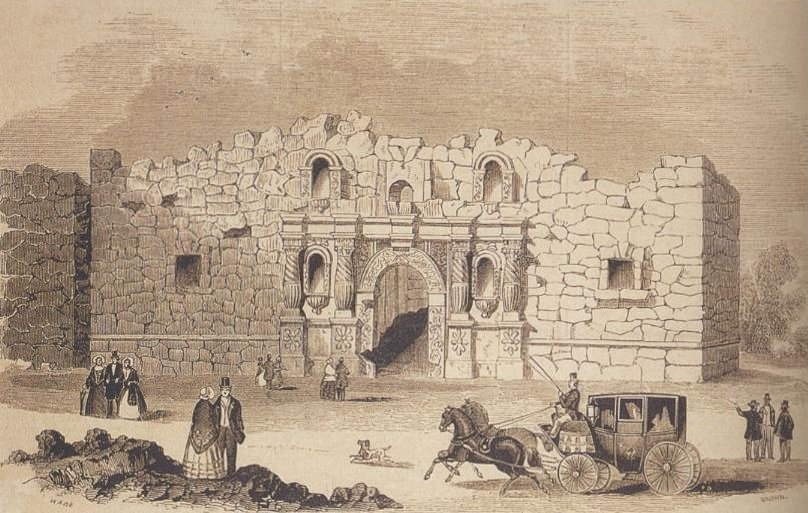
- The Alamo, as drawn in 1854
Date	February 23 – March 6, 1836
Location	San Antonio, Mexican Texas 29°25′32″N 98°29′10″W
Result	Mexican victory

Belligerents
Mexican Republic	Republic of Texas

Commanders and leaders
Antonio López de Santa Anna; Manuel Fernandez Castrillon; Martin Perfecto de Cos	William Travis †; James Bowie †; Davy Crockett †

Strength
1,800–2,200	185–260

Casualties and losses
Mexicans historians reports casualties 50–250 were killed Texans reported casualties 400–600 to 1,000–1,600 killed and wounded	182–257

The siege of the Alamo (February 23 – March 6, 1836) was the first thirteen days of the Battle of the Alamo. On February 23, Mexican troops under General Antonio Lopez de Santa Anna entered San Antonio de Bexar, Texas, and surrounded the Alamo Mission. The Alamo was defended by a small force of Texians and Tejanos, led by William Barrett Travis and James Bowie, and included Davy Crockett. Before beginning his assault on the Alamo, Santa Anna offered them one last chance to surrender. Travis replied by opening fire on the Mexican forces and, in doing so, effectively sealed their fate. The siege ended when the Mexican Army launched an early-morning assault on March 6. Almost all of the defenders were killed, although several civilians survived.

== Background ==
In 1835, as the Mexican government began to shift away from a federalist model, violence erupted in several Mexican states, including the border region Mexican Texas. By the end of the year, Texian forces had expelled all Mexican soldiers from the area. In Mexico City, President Antonio López de Santa Anna had begun gathering an army to retake Texas.

When Mexican troops departed San Antonio de Béxar (now San Antonio, Texas, US), Texian soldiers established a garrison at the Alamo Mission, a former Spanish religious outpost which had been converted to a makeshift fort. Described by Santa Anna as an "irregular fortification hardly worthy of the name", the Alamo had been designed to withstand an attack by native tribes, not an artillery-equipped army. The complex sprawled across 3 acres (1.2 ha), providing almost 1,320 feet (400 m) of perimeter to defend. An interior plaza was bordered on the east by the chapel and to the south by a one-story building known as the Low Barracks. A wooden palisade stretched between these two buildings. The two-story Long Barracks extended north from the chapel. At the northern corner of the east wall stood a cattle pen and horse corral. The walls surrounding the complex were at least 2.75 feet (0.84 m) thick and ranged from 9–12 ft (2.7–3.7 m) high. (Note: The plaza covered an area 75 feet (23 m) long and 62 feet (19 m) wide. The Low Barracks was 114 feet (35 m) long, and the Long Barracks was 186 feet (57 m) long and 18 feet (5.5 m) wide. (Myers (1948), pp. 180–181.))

On February 11, the commander of the Alamo, Colonel James C. Neill, left the Alamo, likely to recruit additional reinforcements and gather supplies. In his absence, the garrison was jointly commanded by newcomers William B. Travis—a regular army officer—and James Bowie, who had commanded a volunteer company. As the Texians struggled to find men and supplies, Santa Anna's army began marching north. On February 12 they crossed the Rio Grande. (Note: Although the Rio Grande now marks the border between Texas and Mexico, in this era the Nueces River, several hundred miles north, was considered the southern boundary of Mexican Texas.)

On February 16 and February 18 local resident Ambrosio Rodriguez warned his good friend William Barret Travis that their relatives further south claimed that Santa Anna was on the march towards Bexar. Two days later Juan Seguin's scout Blas María Herrera reported that the vanguard of the Mexican army had crossed the Rio Grande. There had been many rumors of Santa Anna's imminent arrival, but Travis ignored them. For several hours that night a council of war held at the Alamo argued over whether to believe the rumors. Travis was convinced that the Mexican army would not arrive in Bexar until at least mid-March. He, and others in the Texian army thought Santa Anna would not march until spring, when the grass had begun to grow again. They overlooked the fact that mesquite grass sprouted earlier than normal grass. Travis had also assumed that Santa Anna would not have begun gathering troops for an invasion of Texas until after he had learned of Cos's defeat; the Texians did not realize that Santa Anna had begun preparations for an invasion months before.

Despite the Texian disbelief, by the evening of February 20 many of the residents of Bexar began to pack their belongings in preparation for leaving. The next day, fifteen of the Tejano volunteers at the Alamo resigned. Seguin had asked Travis to release the men so that they could help evacuate their families, who were in the path Santa Anna would take to reach Bexar. Santa Anna had crossed the Rio Grande on February 16. The next night, his army camped on the Nueces River, 119 miles (192 km) from Bexar. Texians had previously burned the bridge over the Nueces, forcing the Mexicans to build a makeshift structure of branches and dirt in the pouring rain. The delay was brief, and on February 19 the vanguard of the army camped along the Frio River, 68 miles (109 km) from Bexar. The following day they reached Hondo, less than 50 miles (80 km) away. By 1:45 pm on February 21 Santa Anna and his vanguard had reached the banks of the Medina River, 25 miles (40 km) from Bexar. Waiting there were dragoons under Colonel Ramirez y Sesma, who had arrived the previous evening. With no idea that the Mexican army was so close, all but 10 members of the Alamo garrison joined about 2000 Bexar residents at a fiesta to celebrate George Washington's birthday. Centralists in Bexar soon alerted Santa Anna to the party, and he ordered General Ramirez y Sesma to lead a cavalry force to take the Alamo while the garrison celebrated elsewhere. The raid had to be called off when sudden rains made the Medina unfordable. The next night, Santa Anna and his army camped at Leon Creek, 8 miles (13 km) west of what is now Downtown San Antonio.

== February 23 ==
In the early hours of February 23, residents began fleeing Béxar, fearing the Mexican army's imminent arrival. Although unconvinced by the reports, Travis stationed a soldier in the San Fernando church bell tower—the highest location in town—to watch for signs of an approaching force. Travis then sent Captain Philip Dimitt and Lieutenant Benjamin Noble to scout for the Mexican Army's location. At approximately 2:30 that afternoon the church bell began to ring; the soldier stationed in the tower claimed to have seen flashes in the distance. Dimitt and Noble had not returned, so Travis sent Dr. James Sutherland (Note: Although many Alamo historians describe Dr. James Sutherland's participation in the early events of the siege, in his book Alamo Traces: New Evidence and New Conclusions Thomas Ricks Lindley concludes that Sutherland was not present in San Antonio de Bexar on February 23.) and John W. Smith on horseback to scout the area. Smith and Sutherland spotted members of the Mexican cavalry within 1.5 miles (2.4 km) of the town and returned to Béxar at a run.

According to later reports from Santa Anna, the cavalry, under General Joaquín Ramírez y Sesma, were supposed to execute a surprise attack on the morning of February 23. Historian Thomas Ricks Lindley concluded that Sesma's troops had captured a Texian spy, Trinidad Coy, who lied about a Texian ambush further ahead, prompting Sesma to halt at 7 a.m. and wait for reinforcements. Historian Lon Tinkle speculated that the combination of the church bell ringing and the sight of the two Texian scouts led Sesma to believe that the Texians were planning an assault on the cavalry.

At this point there were approximately 156 effective Texian soldiers in the Alamo, with another 14 in the hospital. (Note: Juan Seguin also entered the compound on the 23 bringing 14 of his men and their family members into the Alamo. Although they had fought at the Battle of Bexar and Captain Salvador Flores was serving in the Alamo under Colonel Neill, Travis considered them as civilians at this point and would not have included them in his total. see Lindley p. 94) The men were completely unprepared for the arrival of the Mexican army, and had no food in the mission. The men quickly herded cattle in the Alamo and scrounged for food in nearby houses. They were able to gather enough beef and corn into the Alamo to last a month. The Alamo garrison also had a large supply of captured Mexican muskets, with over 19,000 paper cartridges, but only a limited supply of powder for the artillery. Several members of the garrison dismantled the blacksmith shop of Antonio Saez and moved much of the material into the Alamo. A few members of the garrison brought their families into the Alamo to keep them safe. Among these was Alamaron Dickinson, who fetched his wife Susanna and their daughter Angelina, and Bowie, who brought his deceased wife's cousins, Gertrudis Navarro and Juana Navarro Alsbury and Alsbury's young son into the fort. It is likely that Navarro and Alsbury also brought their family's servants, Sam and Bettie. (Note: Alsbury's husband, Horace Alsbury, was a member of the Texian army and departed for Gonzales immediately after Juana moved into the Alamo to warn the settlers that the Mexican Army was outside of Béxar. Lindley (2003), p. 87.)

A flag similar to this was raised in Military Plaza in defiance of the Mexican troops. The two stars represented Mexican Texas and Coahuila as separate states.

While the bulk of the garrison prepared for the attack, a few Texians remained in Béxar and raised a flag in the middle of Military Plaza. According to historian J.R. Edmondson, "The flag was a variation of the Mexican tricolor with two stars, representing the separated states of Texas and Coahuila, gleaming from the white center bar." Within an hour the first of the Mexican cavalry, commanded by Colonel Jose Vicente Minon, entered Béxar. The Texians lowered their flag and brought it into the Alamo.

As the Mexican cavalry approached, Travis dispatched a man named John Johnson to ask Colonel James Fannin, 100 miles (160 km) southeast, to send reinforcements immediately. Travis then sent Smith and Sutherland to bring a message to the alcade at Gonzales, 70 miles (110 km) away. The note to Gonzales read: "The enemy in large force is in sight. We want men and provisions. Send them to us. We have 150 men and are determined to defend the Alamo to the last."

By late afternoon, Béxar was occupied by about 1500 Mexican troops, who quickly raised a blood-red flag signifying "No Quarter". Soon after, a Mexican bugler sounded the request for parley. Travis ordered the Alamo's 18-pounder cannon fired. The Mexican army responded with four balls from 7-in howitzers; the balls hit the interior of the Alamo but caused no damage or injuries. Santa Anna later reported that the initial Texian cannon fire killed two Mexican soldiers and wounded eight others; no other Mexican officer, however, reported fatalities from that day.

Bowie believed that Travis had acted hastily and sent Green B. Jameson to meet with Santa Anna. Jameson carried a letter addressed to "The Commander of the invading forces below Bejar" and signed "Commander of the volunteers of Bejar". Angry that Bowie presented himself as Santa Anna's equal, the Mexican general refused to meet with Jameson, but allowed Colonel Juan Almonte and Jose Bartres to parley. Almonte later said that Jameson asked for an honorable surrender, but Bartres replied "I reply to you, according to the order of His Excellency, that the Mexican army cannot come to terms under any conditions with rebellious foreigners to whom there is no recourse left, if they wish to save their lives, than to place themselves immediately at the disposal of the Supreme Government from whom alone they may expect clemency after some considerations." Travis was angered that Bowie had acted unilaterally and sent his own emissary to the Mexican army; he received the same response. Bowie and Travis then mutually agreed to fire the cannon again.

By the time the parleys were over it was nightfall, and the firing ceased. That evening the Mexicans erected an artillery battery near the Veramendi house. Santa Anna also sent General Ventura Mora's cavalry to circle to the north and east of the Alamo to prevent the arrival of Texian reinforcements. According to Edmondson, the Texians sent a small party to forage that evening. They returned with six pack mules and a prisoner, a Mexican soldier who would later be used to interpret Mexican bugle calls. The Texians received one reinforcement that night, when one of Seguin's men, Gregorio Esparza, arrived with his family. Texian sentries refused to open the gate, but others helped the family climb through the window of the chapel. Several other Texian soldiers were unable to make it into the Alamo. Dimitt and Noble, who had been scouting for signs of the Mexican army, were told by a local that Bexar was surrounded, and they would be unable to re-enter the town. Andrew Jackson Sowell and Byrd Lockhart had been out that morning looking for provisions; on hearing that the Alamo was surrounded they left for their homes in Gonzales.

== February 24 ==
Wednesday, February 24 marked the first full day of the siege. Throughout the day, the Mexican army reconnoitered the Alamo defenses. At 11 a.m. Santa Anna accompanied the cavalry on a scouting mission, coming within musket shot of the Alamo. Later that afternoon Santa Anna personally presided over the distribution of shoes to some members of his army. At roughly the same time, he ordered a Mexican artillery battery consisting of two 8-lb cannons and a mortar located 350 yards (320 m) from the Alamo to begin firing. Mexican Colonel Juan Almonte wrote in his diary that two of the Alamo's guns, including the massive 18-lb cannon, were dismounted. The Texians were able to bring them back into service quickly.

Bowie had been ill. and at some point during the day he collapsed and was confined to his bed. Fearing that he was contagious, Bowie moved into a small room in the low barracks along the south wall of the mission. Travis was now in sole command of the garrison. That afternoon Travis wrote a letter addressed To the People of Texas & All Americans in the World, which is, according to Mary Deborah Petite "considered by many as one of the masterpieces of American patriotism". Travis sent the letter with courier Albert Martin, who delivered it to Gonzales. There, Launcelot Smithers took custody of the message and delivered it to San Felipe, where it was read by Governor Henry Smith. Smith told the colonists at San Felipe "to fly to the aid of your besieged countrymen and not permit them to be massacred by a mercenary foe. ... The call is upon ALL who are able to bear arms, to rally without one moment's delay, or in fifteen days the heart of Texas will be the seat of war." The letter was eventually reprinted throughout the United States and much of Europe.

In the early evening, Mexican Colonel Juan Bringas led scouts across a footbridge over the San Antonio River; Texian sharpshooters quickly killed one soldier and the Mexicans retreated, but Davy Crockett managed to drop a second man before the enemy finally reached cover. Throughout the night the Mexican artillery sporadically bombarded the church and long barracks, while the Mexican army fired muskets and shouted to fool the Texians into believing that an assault was imminent, or that Texian reinforcements were being slaughtered. Santa Anna also ordered that his military band serenade the Texians throughout the night. Mexican soldiers took advantage of the darkness and the distractions of the countrymen to erect two more artillery batteries around the Alamo. The two batteries combined to hold two 8-lb cannons, two 6-lb cannon, two 4-lb cannon, and two 7-in howitzers. One of the batteries was located along the right bank of the San Antonio River, approximately 1,000 feet (300 m) from the south wall of the Alamo. The other was located 1,000 feet (300 m) east of the eastern wall. By the end of the first full day of the siege the Mexican army had been reinforced by 600 of Sesma's troops. Antonio Gaona and the First Brigade were still several days march away, while an additional 400–500 men and most of the Mexican artillery were struggling through mud south of Bexar.

== February 25 ==
The Mexican bombardment continued through the morning of February 25. At approximately 10 a.m. about 200–300 Mexican soldiers, primarily cazadores from the Matamoros Battalion, crossed the San Antonio river and took cover in abandoned shacks approximately 90 yards (82 m) to 100 yards (91 m) from the Alamo walls. The Mexican soldiers were intending to use the huts as cover to erect another artillery battery, although many Texians assumed they were actually launching an assault on the fort. Travis called for volunteers to burn the huts, despite the fact that it was broad daylight and they would be within musket range of the Mexican soldiers. Charles Despallier, Robert Brown, James Rose and a few others volunteered for the mission. To provide cover, Dickinson and his men fired their 8-lb cannons, filled with grapeshot and canister, at the Mexican soldiers in the huts. Crockett and his men fired rifles, while other Texians reloaded extra weapons for them. Within two hours the battle was over. As soon as the Texians saw flames erupting from the huts they threw open the Alamo gate, and the Texians re-entered the Alamo, unscathed, although Rose was almost captured by a Mexican officer. The Mexican soldiers retreated, after six of their soldiers were killed and four wounded, while several Texians had been mildly scratched by flying rock.

That afternoon Mexican soldiers were posted east of the Alamo, on the road to Gonzales. Santa Anna learned that a beautiful 17-year-old girl, Melchora Barrera, and her widowed mother had remained in town, and he dispatched one of his men to ask the girl to be Santa Anna's mistress. According to historian J.R. Edmondson, the girl's mother refused the offer, and, although Santa Anna was already married, one of his officers dressed up as a priest and performed a marriage ceremony. Santa Anna then retired to enjoy a honeymoon.

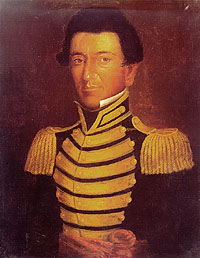
Juan Seguin left the Alamo as a courier on February 25, 1836.

Santa Anna sent a messenger to tell Gaona to hurry to Bexar with his three best companies. At the time, the First Brigade was at San Ambrosio, a day's march north of the Rio Grande. According to the diary of Jose Enrique de la Pena, on this day carelessness led the Aldama Battalion's powder supply to catch fire, causing "considerable alarm". Travis also wrote another letter requesting help. The Texian officers voted that Seguin should carry the message. Travis was adamant that Seguin remain behind, as his knowledge of the language, the countryside, and Mexican customs was invaluable. The Texians believed that none of the other couriers had made it through the Mexican lines, and told Travis that Seguin's knowledge of Spanish would also help him to avoid capture by Mexican patrols. Seguin, riding Bowie's horse, which was the fastest in the mission, and his aide Antonio Cruz left about 9 pm. Seguin did not expect to survive the mission; he and Cruz encountered a Mexican cavalry patrol but were able to escape using their knowledge of Spanish and the local terrain.

After dark, a small party of Texians left the Alamo to burn down more of the huts; all were able to return to the Alamo without injury. Despite their efforts, several huts remained standing, and overnight the Mexican army was able to erect a battery only 300 yards (270 m) from the Alamo. An additional battery was erected at a location known as old Powderhouse, 1,000 yards (910 m) to the southeast of the Alamo. The Mexican army now had artillery stationed on three sides of the Alamo. Historian Walter Lord said that in the evening several Mexicans left the Alamo and asked to surrender to Santa Anna; they were told that Santa Anna had retired for the evening and could not be disturbed.

== February 26–27 ==
Residents of Bexar were able to come into or near the Alamo in the first few days of the siege. Seguin's meals had even been delivered by a local, Estaban Pacheco. During the first week of the siege over 200 Mexican cannon shots landed in the Alamo plaza. The Texians often picked up the cannonballs and reused them. Although the Texians had matched Mexican artillery fire, on February 26, Travis ordered the artillery to stop firing to conserve powder and shot. Crockett and his men were encouraged to keep shooting, as they rarely missed and thus didn't waste shot. Through the early days of the siege, the Texians didn't bother to take cover, as the Mexicans were too far out of their range to cause harm with their muskets; any Mexican soldier who ventured within 200 yards (180 m) of the Alamo, however, risked death or injury. A cold wave blew in that evening and dropped the temperature to 39 degrees F. Neither army was prepared for the cold temperatures. Several Texians ventured out to gather firewood but returned empty-handed after encountering Mexican skirmishers. On the evening of February 26, the Texians burned more huts, these located near the San Luis Potosí Battalion. Santa Anna sent Colonel Juan Bringas to engage the Texians, and according to Edmondson, one Texian was killed.

On February 26, news of the siege finally reached acting governor James W. Robinson, who immediately sent a courier to find Sam Houston. Travis's messengers were having small successes. Albert Martin had reached Gonzales, the most westerly community of Texians, on February 25, the day after Sutherland and Smith had arrived with Travis's first message. As couriers delivered the messages to other settlements, reinforcements assembled in Gonzales, waiting for Fannin to arrive with more troops so they could travel together. In Gonzales itself, Robert "Three-Legged Willie" Williamson began a recruitment drive. In Bastrop, Edward Burleson began organizing a militia, which likely left for Gonzales on February 27, arriving the following day.

Unbeknownst to the Texians, Colonel James Fannin had finally decided to ride to their relief. Historian Robert Scott suggests that the trip was initiated after Fannin's objections were overridden by his officers. On the morning of February 26, he set out with 320 men, 4 cannon, and several supply wagons for the 90 miles (140 km) march from Goliad to the Alamo. The Goliad garrison had no horses to move the wagons and artillery and were forced to rely on oxen. Barely 200 yards (180 m) into their journey, one of the wagons broke down, and the expedition stopped for repairs. The group then took six hours to cross the waist-deep water of the San Antonio River. By the time they reached the other side it was dark, and the men camped along the river. The cold front reached Goliad that evening, and the poorly-dressed soldiers were "quickly chilled and miserable" in the driving rain. On awakening, Fannin realized that all of the Texian oxen had wandered off, and that his men had neglected to pack food for the journey. It took most of the day for the men to round up the oxen; after two days of travel, Fannin's men had not even ventured 1 mile (1.6 km) from their fort. In a letter to Acting Governor James Robinson, Fannin said that his officers approached him to ask that the rescue trip be cancelled, as they had received word that General Urrea's army was marching towards Goliad. The officers and men in the expedition claimed that Fannin decided on his own to abort the mission. Several of the men agreed with the decision, with Dr. Barnard writing in his journal, "With but three or four hundred men, mostly on foot, with but a limited supply of provisions, to march a distance of nearly one-hundred miles through uninhabited country for the purpose of relieving a fortress beleaguered by five-thousand men was madness!"

Before initially leaving Goliad, Fannin sent a courier to Gonzales to instruct Williamson to rendezvous at Cibolo Creek, halfway between Gonzales and San Antonio just north of present-day La Vernia. On February 28, about 60 men, including Captain Albert Martin, travelled the 20 miles (32 km) from Gonzales to Cibolo Creek to wait for Fannin and his men. Lindley speculates that Fannin sent an advance relief force under Captain John Chenoweth and Francis de Sauque to scout the area around Bexar. The advance force reached as far as the Seguin ranch, gathering corn, cattle, horses, and mules, then turned back to wait along Cibolo Creek for the remainder of Fannin's force.

Several residents had seen Fannin march from Goliad and sent messengers to Bexar to inform Santa Anna that Fannin and 300 men were headed for the Alamo. Santa Anna ordered Colonel Juan Almonte and 800 dragoons to intercept the Texian relief force. Unaware of Fannin's attempted relief mission, Travis sent James Bonham to Goliad to persuade him. Bonham was asked to tie a white handkerchief around his hat when he returned so that the Texians would know to open the gates for him.

Much of the Mexican army's provisions were in the rear of the convoy with Gaona and Filisola. Santa Anna had hoped to restock his army's supplies in Bexar, but were unable to find much. He finally asked a local citizen, Manuel Menchaca, to help them find food; Menchaca led the army to the Seguin and Flores ranches and stole all of their corn, beef, and hogs. Santa Anna sent more couriers to Gaona and Filisola to urge them to hurry; Filisola was still at the Rio Grande.

During the day the Mexican army tried to block the irrigation ditch leading into the Alamo. Texian Green Jameson tasked the men in the Alamo with finishing a well at the south end of the plaza. Although the men hit water, they weakened an earth and timber parapet by the low barracks; the mound collapsed, leaving no way to fire safely over that wall. The same day Texians spotted a Mexican general surrounded by aides and dragoons and fired, but did not hit any of them. The Texians did not realize it was Santa Anna.

== February 28 – March 2 ==
Digital reproduction of the Come and Take It flag.

After learning that Fannin was not coming and that there would likely be no other reinforcements, a group of 25 men set out from Gonzales at 2 pm on Saturday, February 27. They were led by Martin and George Kimbell, Almaron Dickinson's business partner. As the group passed the ranch of volunteer John G. King on their way out of town his fifteen-year-old son, Wiliam, rushed out and asked to take his father's place, as John King was needed to support the family's nine children. The men agreed, and William exchanged places with his father. On the march to Bexar eight additional men joined the group. The men carried with them the first flag ever made for use in a Texian battle; the Come and take it flag from the Battle of Gonzales.

According to Lindley, Martin, Smith, and at least 34 other men chose not to wait for Fannin but continued on towards Bexar. The men from Bastrop and some of the others from Gonzales decided to wait, including Edwin T. Mitchell, Fannin's courier. By the night of February 27, Travis sent Samuel G. Bastian to go to Gonzales "to hurry up reinforcements". According to Lindley, Bastian ran across Martin's men from Gonzales and volunteered to lead them to the Alamo. In an interview several years later, Bastian said that the group encountered a roving patrol of Mexican soldiers. Four of the men, including Bastian, became separated from the larger group and were forced to hide. However, Juan Almonte's journal did not mention any firing by Mexican soldiers that evening. The following year, Santa Anna'a secretary Roman Martinez Caro did report firing by Mexican lines {in 1837} that "two small reinforcements from Gonzales that succeeded in breaking through our lines and entering the fort. The first consisted of four men who gained the fort one night, and the second was a party of twenty-five".

Edmondson relates a different version of the campaign. According to his research, as the Gonzales men approached the Alamo in the early hours of March 1 a rider appeared in front of them and asked, in English, if they wished to go into the fort. When they said yes, he turned and told them to follow him. When one of the men became suspicious, the rider bolted away. The volunteers were afraid they had been discovered and galloped towards the Alamo. All of the versions agree that in the darkness, the Texians thought this was a party of Mexican soldiers and fired, wounding one of the volunteers. They finally managed to convince the defenders to open the gates. The reinforcements likely carried a letter from Williamson with news that men were assembling in Gonzales and would join Fannin in coming to their rescue.

Other Texian militias were preparing to march to the Alamo. In Victoria, Colonel Wharton was preparing to cross the Guadalupe River, while in San Felipe, Captain Mosely Baker ordered the local militia to prepare to march on February 29. Seguin recruited an additional 25 Tejanos, and Dr. Sutherland and Horace Alsbury, husband of Juana Navarro Alsbury, recruited 12 more men and set out on February 28 for Cibolo in the hopes of meeting Fannin. Meanwhile, Bonham had spoken with Fannin, who again declined to relieve the Alamo. Bonham then went to Gonzales, only to find that most of the men who weren't at the Alamo had gone to the constitutional convention. He did meet nineteen-year-old Ben Highsmith, who had left the Alamo as a courier before Santa Anna's arrival. Highsmith had tried to return to the Alamo but had been chased for 6 miles (9.7 km) by Mexican cavalry; he told Bonham that no one could get through the Mexican lines. Despite the warning, on March 2 Bonham crossed the Guadalupe en route to the Alamo. Unbeknownst to both the Mexican and Texian soldiers, on March 2, delegates to the Convention of 1836 adopted the Texas Declaration of Independence; the Texians were now fighting for the new Republic of Texas. That evening, the Convention finally received Travis's letter of February 25. Shortly thereafter, they received word that Fannin had departed Goliad for the Alamo. Believing that the Alamo would be adequately reinforced, the delegates took no further action.

During this time period, the Mexican army continued to venture nearer the Alamo. By February 29, the Allende Infantry Battalion was stationed on the east side of the complex, while the Jiménez Battalion guarded the left, along the road to Gonzales. Texian sharpshooters remained on alert, and on the evening of February 29 killed Private First Class Secundino Alvarez, who had been ordered to ride near the Alamo to reconnoiter the defenses. On the afternoon of March 2, Santa Anna himself conducted a scouting trip. He discovered a road near the Alamo and moved the Jiménez Battalion to guard it.

== March 3 ==
Bonham arrived near Bexar around 11 am on March 3. Wearing a white bandana in his hat to notify the Texians that he was one of them, he spurred his horse and rode, unmolested, through the Alamo gate as the ring of Mexican soldiers looked on in surprise. Bonham's news, that Fannin was not coming after all, reportedly demoralized the Alamo garrison. Travis sent a courier that evening to the convention with news that the Texians had thus far survived the siege with no losses. He warned, however, that: "I look to the colonies alone for aid; unless it arrives soon, I shall have to fight the enemy on his own terms. I will, however, do the best I can under the circumstances, and I feel confident that the determined valour and desperate courage, heretofore evinced by my men, will not fail them in the last struggle, and although they may be sacrificed to the vengeance of a Gothic enemy, the victory will cost the enemy so dear, that it will be worse for him than a defeat." Travis ended his letter with news that despite the dearth of ammunition, his men would fire the 18-lb cannon three times each day as proof that they still held the fort. Travis then wrote several private letters and entrusted all of the communications to John W. Smith, who volunteered to sneak through the enemy lines.

According to Lindley's research, other Texians were also determined to join those at the Alamo. He identified up to 50 of Fannin's men, most of whom had been in Thomas H. Breece's company of New Orleans Greys, who left Goliad to go to the rescue of their former mates. Lindley believes that on March 3 these men likely joined the advance unit under Chenoweth and Desauque, as well as Seguin and his Tejano unit. That afternoon, the entire group joined the group waiting at Cibolo Creek, 35 miles (56 km) from the Alamo. At this point, Lindley calculated that the Alamo should have had approximately 164 effective men.

On the afternoon of March 3, reinforcements arrived for Santa Anna's army. The Zapadores, Aldama, and Toluca battalions arrived between 4 and 5 pm, after marching steadily for days. The Texians watched from the walls as approximately 1000 Mexican troops, attired in dress uniform, marched into Bexar's military plaza. The Mexican army celebrated loudly throughout the afternoon, both in honor of their reinforcements and at the news that troops under General Jose de Urrea had soundly defeated Texian Colonel Frank W. Johnson at the Battle of San Patricio on February 27. Most of the Texians in the Alamo had believed that Ramirez y Sesma had been leading the Mexican forces during the siege, and they mistakenly attributed the celebration to the arrival of Santa Anna. The reinforcements brought the number of Mexican soldiers in Bexar to almost 2,400.

During the day, the Mexican army had erected a battery on the north side of the Alamo, within musket shot of the complex walls. Unlike previous bombardments, each shot from this battery impacted the walls, causing them to begin to crumble. By nightfall, part of the wall had begun to collapse, and Jameson kept the men working all night to shore up the walls with pieces of lumber.

Almonte's journal reported that there was an engagement after dark on March 3, but that the Mexican troops had repulsed the assault. Several historians, including Walter Lord, speculated that the Texians were creating a diversion to allow Smith to escape. However, in 1876, Susannah Dickinson said that Travis sent three men out shortly after dark on March 3, probably in response to the arrival of the Mexican reinforcements. The three men, who Dickinson believed included Davy Crockett, were sent to find Fannin. Lindley stated that just before midnight, Crockett and one of the other men found the force of Texians waiting along Cibolo Creek, who had advanced to within 20 miles (32 km) of the Alamo. Just before daylight on March 4, part of the Texian force managed to break through the Mexican lines and enter the Alamo. A second group was driven across the prairie by Mexican soldiers. Lindley based his assumptions on two newspaper reports published within a month of the Alamo's fall that stated that 50 men had reinforced the Alamo a few days before the final assault.

== March 4–5 ==
The Mexican bombardment recommenced early on March 4. That afternoon, Santa Anna called a council of war with his senior officers. He proposed an imminent attack on the fort. Many of his officers disagreed, recommending instead that they wait for the arrival of the heavy artillery. Two 12-lb cannons, with the capability to quickly destroy the Alamo walls, were due to arrive in Bexar on Monday, March 7. According to later reports by Filisola, on the evening of March 4, a woman from Bexar informed Santa Anna that Travis and his men were planning to either surrender or escape if reinforcements did not arrive quickly. Many years later, Susannah Dickinson commented that Juana Alsbury left the fort that evening; Dickinson believed that Alsbury had deserted to provide Santa Anna with information about the Texian troop strength. Edmondson notes that Alsbury returned to the Alamo, and he speculates that Travis sent her to try to negotiate an honorable surrender for the Texian troops. According to Todish, "More than one historian, and even some of Santa Anna's own officers, have speculated that this information is what prompted him to push for an immediate assault rather than wait for his heavy siege guns. There would have been little glory in a bloodless victory, and glory is what Santa Anna craved above all else."

Saturday, March 5, marked a brief departure from the frigid temperatures of the preceding days, as the air warmed to between 50 and 68 degrees F. That morning, Santa Anna called another staff meeting and announced that the assault would commence the following day. Again, officers advocated waiting for the arrival of the heavy artillery. According to his aide, Fernando Urissa, Santa Anna responded "What are the lives of soldiers than so many chickens? I tell you, the Alamo must fall, and my orders must be obeyed at all hazards. If our soldiers are driven back, the next line in their rear must force those before them forward, and compel them to scale the walls, cost what it may." The decision made, General Juan Valentín Amador drew up detailed battle orders. The orders instructed all men to wear shoes or sandals and to properly tie their shako chin-straps. Despite the cold, soldiers were prohibited from wearing cloaks or blankets, as these might limit their movements on the battlefield. Each soldier would receive either 4 or 6 rounds of ammunition and would be given 2 flints.

Mexican soldiers would be divided into four columns. Cos would command the first column, consisting of the Aldama Battalion and three companies of the San Luis Battalion. The remaining rifle companies of the San Luis Battalion, as well as the Toluca Battalion, would be under the command of Colonel Francisco Duque. A third column, commanded by Colonel Jose Maria Romero, comprised the rifle companies from the Matamoros and Jiménez Battalions. The scouting companies of the Matamoros, Jiménez, and San Luis Battalions would form the fourth column, under Juan Morales. Santa Anna would command the reserve force, primarily the grenadier companies from each of the battalions. The cavalry would guard the camp and patrol the area around the battlefield to stop any soldier, Texian or Mexican, who attempted to desert. Although not explicitly codified in the orders, Santa Anna ensured that the presidial troops who had previously been stationed in Bexar did not take part in the fighting; this would ensure that relatives were not forced to fight each other.

That evening, James Allen became the last courier to leave the Alamo, carrying messages from Travis and several of the other men. Legend holds that at some point on March 5, Travis gathered his men and explained that an attack was likely imminent, and that the Mexican Army would likely prevail. He supposedly drew a line in the sand and asked those willing to die for the Texian cause to cross and stand alongside him. A bedridden Bowie requested that Crockett and several others carry his cot over the line, leaving only one man, Louis "Moses" Rose on the other side. Explaining that he was not yet ready to die, Rose escaped that evening. This episode was first mentioned in a newspaper article written thirty-five years after the Alamo fell by a reporter who said his parents heard the story directly from Rose. The reporter had admitted to embellishing pieces of the article, and as Rose had died by the time the story was published, so the story could not be authenticated. Years after the story was published, Alamo survivors Susannah Dickinson and Enrique Esparza mentioned the incident, but many details conflicted.

At 10 pm, the Mexican artillery ceased their bombardment. As Santa Anna had planned, the exhausted Texians soon fell into a deep sleep, the first uninterrupted sleep many had gotten since the siege began. Three Texians were sent to act as sentries outside the walls.

== March 6 ==
At midnight, Mexican soldiers began silently moving towards their places to await the start of battle. The Texian sentries were surprised and killed quickly before they could raise an alarm. Despite the orders to forgo overcoats, cloaks, and blankets, the men were instructed to lay on their stomachs on the cold, damp grass. Although the original orders gave the battle starting time as 4 am, the soldiers were not completely in place until about 5 am. Some were stationed within 300 feet (91 m) of the Alamo. At 5:30 am, Santa Anna gave the order for the advance, and his excited troops began shouting "Viva Santa Anna, Viva la republica!" The shouting woke the Texians, but by the time they reached their posts the Mexican soldiers were already within musket range.
