= Antonio Gaona =

Antonio Gaona may refer to:

- Antonio Gaona (general)
- Antonio Gaona (actor)
