= Juan Valentín Amador =

Mexican general

- Born: 1781; Cuba
- Died: 1848 (aged 66–67)
- Occupation: general

Juan Valentín Amador (1781–1848) was a general in the Mexican army of the 19th century. He served under Mexican President Antonio López de Santa Anna during the Texas Revolution.

== Early life ==
Juan Valentín Amador was born in Cuba in 1781. He began his military career as a member of the Spanish lancers. He then joined the Army of the Three Guarantees under Agustín de Iturbide. His military performance earned him the rank of brigadier-general in 1831.

== Texas Revolution ==
During the Texas Revolution, General Juan Valentín Amador joined Santa Anna on the 1836 invasion of Texas, which first journeyed to San Antonio de Bexar, and besieged the meager Texan forces garrisoned at the Alamo fort.

Amador arrived in San Antonio on March 23, 1836, for the Battle of the Alamo. Juan Valentín Amador and the bulk of his troops were traveling ahead of the Mexican convoy that was transporting the heavy artillery and supplies.

On March 5, Santa Anna called a staff meeting and announced that the assault would commence the following day. Officers advocated waiting for the arrival of the heavy artillery. According to Fernando Urissa, Santa Anna responded "What are the lives of soldiers than so many chickens? I tell you, the Alamo must fall, and my orders must be obeyed at all hazards. If our soldiers are driven back, the next line in their rear must force those before them forward, and compel them to scale the walls, cost what it may." The decision for an all out attack was made and General Amador was chosen to draw up the detailed battle orders. Amador was selected to command the First Column of battalions, if General Cos was injured or unable to perform his duties.

On March 6, General Juan Valentín Amador led the first Mexican troops over the northern walls of the Alamo. Mexican soldiers had been repulsed for three times, but during the third strike, attacking soldiers from the east, shifted to the north and mingled with the northern column. The soldiers on the west side also headed north. When Santa Anna saw that his army was bunched up against the north wall, he feared a rout and sent the reserve units into the northern walled area.

Amador realized that the log reinforced north wall contained many gaps and toeholds. He was one of the first to scale the 12-foot (3.7 m) wall. Juan Amador then challenged his men to do the same and they began climbing up the and over the wall. Amador opened the gate in the north wall, allowing Mexican soldiers to pour into the complex. As the Texan defenders abandoned their posts on the northern portion of the walls, Amador ordered the cannon near Travis' body turned and discharged at the barricaded long barracks. The defensive gunners at the south end of the Alamo then turned their cannon northwards and fired towards Amador and into the advancing soldiers. However, there were Mexican soldiers who had entered the walls behind them, who then killed the gunners. They gained control of the Alamo's unmanned 18-pounder cannon and turned it against the last of the defenders.

After Santa Anna was defeated at the battle of San Jacinto, Juan Valentín Amador returned to Mexico with the remainder of the Mexican forces now led by General Vicente Filísola.

== Later life ==
In Mexico, he died in 1851.

== See also ==
- Timeline of the Texas Revolution
- Mexican–American War
