= Andrew Jackson Sowell =

Soldier of the Texas Revolution

- Born: 27 June 1815; Davidson County, Tennessee, US
- Died: 4 January 1883 (aged 67); Seguin, Texas, US
- Military career
- Allegiance: The Republic of Texas, United States of America
- Branch: Texian Army, Republic of Texas Militia, Republic of Texas Army, US Army
- Service years: 1835–1836, 1836–1846, 1846–1865
- Units: Texian volunteer and regular army
- Conflicts: Battle of Concepcion Grass Fight; Siege of Bexar; Siege of the Alamo; Runaway Scrape; Council House Fight; Texas–Indian wars Battle of Plum Creek; Battle of Salado Creek (1842); Mexican–American War American Civil War

Andrew Jackson Sowell (June 27, 1815 – January 4, 1883) was a lifelong soldier and farmer in the 19th century. He was a participant in the Texas Revolution and a survivor of the siege of the Alamo. He continued his service during the years of the Republic of Texas, in the Mexican–American War, and the Civil War. He was a frontier defender, early Texas Ranger, and a friend and scout with Kit Carson.

== Early life and family ==
Andrew Jackson Sowell was born in Davidson County, Tennessee in June 1815. His family traveled from Tennessee to Missouri, and then moved to Texas. His father John Newton Sowell and family settled in Dewitt Colony, Texas in 1829. Like his father, Andrew J. Sowell tried his hand at farming in what is now Guadalupe County, Texas. His family were the first Anglo settlers near Walnut Springs and became the first Anglo-Americans to successfully raise corn in this area.

== Texas Revolution ==
In 1835, Sowell fought in the Battle of Gonzales, when the town would not surrender the "Come and Take It" cannon to Francisco de Castañeda and his Mexican troops sent to retrieve it. His father had been one of the "Old Eighteen", defending the colony's right to keep the cannon. This incident was the first shot fired in the Texas Revolution. Sowell went on to take part in the Battle of Concepción and the Grass Fight. Although a participant in the Texians' attempt to take San Antonio, he was unprepared for inclement weather, and like many others he returned home for the winter. In December the Texians drove the Mexican soldiers under General Martín Perfecto de Cos from Mexican Texas after this siege of Bexar.

At the Alamo

In February, 1836 Sowell volunteered again during the Siege of the Alamo. Although he served in the old mission fort while the army of Santa Anna was already in the vicinity of San Antonio, he and Byrd Lockhart were sent out as couriers and foragers. They went as far as Gonzales, Texas to buy cattle and supplies for the Alamo garrison. But upon their return to San Antonio, they were not able to enter as the Alamo was surrounded by Santa Anna's army. From the Alamo they headed to Gonzales, where Sowell assisted the Texian settlers who became refugees in the Runaway Scrape. After insuring the safety of the civilians, he marched towards San Jacinto to join Sam Houston's troops, arriving after the Battle of San Jacinto had commenced.

== The Republic of Texas ==
After Texas gained its independence from Mexico, Sowell was a Texas Ranger under the Republic and later the State of Texas. He was a member of Colonel Mathew Caldwell's company in the Council House Fight 1840, the Battle of Plum Creek later in 1840, and in the Battle of Salado Creek (1842). Later he served with Rangers Jack Coffee Hays, Benjamin McCulloch, James Hughes Callahan, and Mason.

== The State of Texas ==
In August, 1838, Andrew J. Sowell was among the 33 signers of the charter for Seguin, one of the first towns established after Texas won independence. Thirty of the founders were listed on the 1839 Muster Roll of Captain Matthew Caldwell's unit of Texas Rangers originally from Gonzales. After Texas became a state, and Guadalupe County was created, the second meeting of the Commissioners Court ordered that a road to Bastrop be laid out by Sowell and three others.

Sowell went on to take part in the Mexican–American War and again served in the Confederate Army during the Civil War. He was a celebrated scout and close friend of Kit Carson.

== Death ==
Sowell died in Seguin, Texas on January 4, 1883, and is buried some miles east of town in the Rogers-Mofield Cemetery, north of U.S. Route 90 Alternate (Texas) near Darst Creek, Texas.[18]

== Legacy ==
In 1841, on the first Alamo monument designed by William B. Nangle, Andrew Jackson Sowell was honored as a defender of the Alamo. Sowell had left San Antonio shortly before the fall of the Alamo, and at first it was believed that he had died there. In his later years, Sowell recalled that his name had once been inscribed among the martyrs, and he claimed to be the only man to live—and see his name among those who died at the Alamo.

== Notes ==
=== Bibliography ===
- Davis, William C. (2006). Lone Star Rising. College Station, TX: Texas A&M University Press. ISBN 978-1-58544-532-5. originally published 2004 by New York: Free Press
- Groneman, Bill (1990). Alamo Defenders, A Genealogy: The People and Their Words. Austin, TX: Eakin Press. ISBN 0-89015-757-X.
- Hansen, Todd (2003). The Alamo Reader: A Study in History. Stackpole Books. ISBN 978-0-8117-0060-3.
- Lindley, Thomas Ricks (2003). Alamo Traces: New Evidence and New Conclusions. Lanham, MD: Republic of Texas Press. ISBN 1-55622-983-6.
- Lord, Walter (1961). A Time to Stand. Lincoln, NE: University of Nebraska Press. ISBN 0-8032-7902-7.
- Moore, Stephen L. (2006). Savage Frontier: Rangers, Riflemen, and Indian Wars in Texas, Volume II, 1838–1839. Denton, TX: University of North Texas Press. ISBN 1-57441-206-X.
- Moore, Stephen L. (2007). Savage Frontier: 1840–1841, Volume III. Denton, TX: University of North Texas Press. ISBN 978-1-57441-229-1.
- Moore, Stephen L. (2010). Savage Frontier: Rangers, Riflemen, and Indian Wars in Texas, Volume IV. Denton, TX: University of North Texas Press. ISBN 978-1-57441-294-9.
- SRT, SRT (2001). Sons of the Republic of Texas. Paducah, KY: Turner Pub Co. ISBN 1-56311-603-0.
- Sowell, Andrew Jackson (2010) [1900]. Early Settlers and Indian Fighters of Southwest Texas. General Books LLC. ISBN 978-1-4590-6750-9.
- Sowell, Andrew Jackson (1991). Rangers and Pioneers of Texas. State House Press. ISBN 978-0938349648.
- Todish, Timothy J.; Todish, Terry; Spring, Ted (1998). Alamo Sourcebook, 1836: A Comprehensive Guide to the Battle of the Alamo and the Texas Revolution. Austin, TX: Eakin Press. ISBN 978-1-57168-152-2.
