= San Jacinto Day =

Texas holiday (April 21)

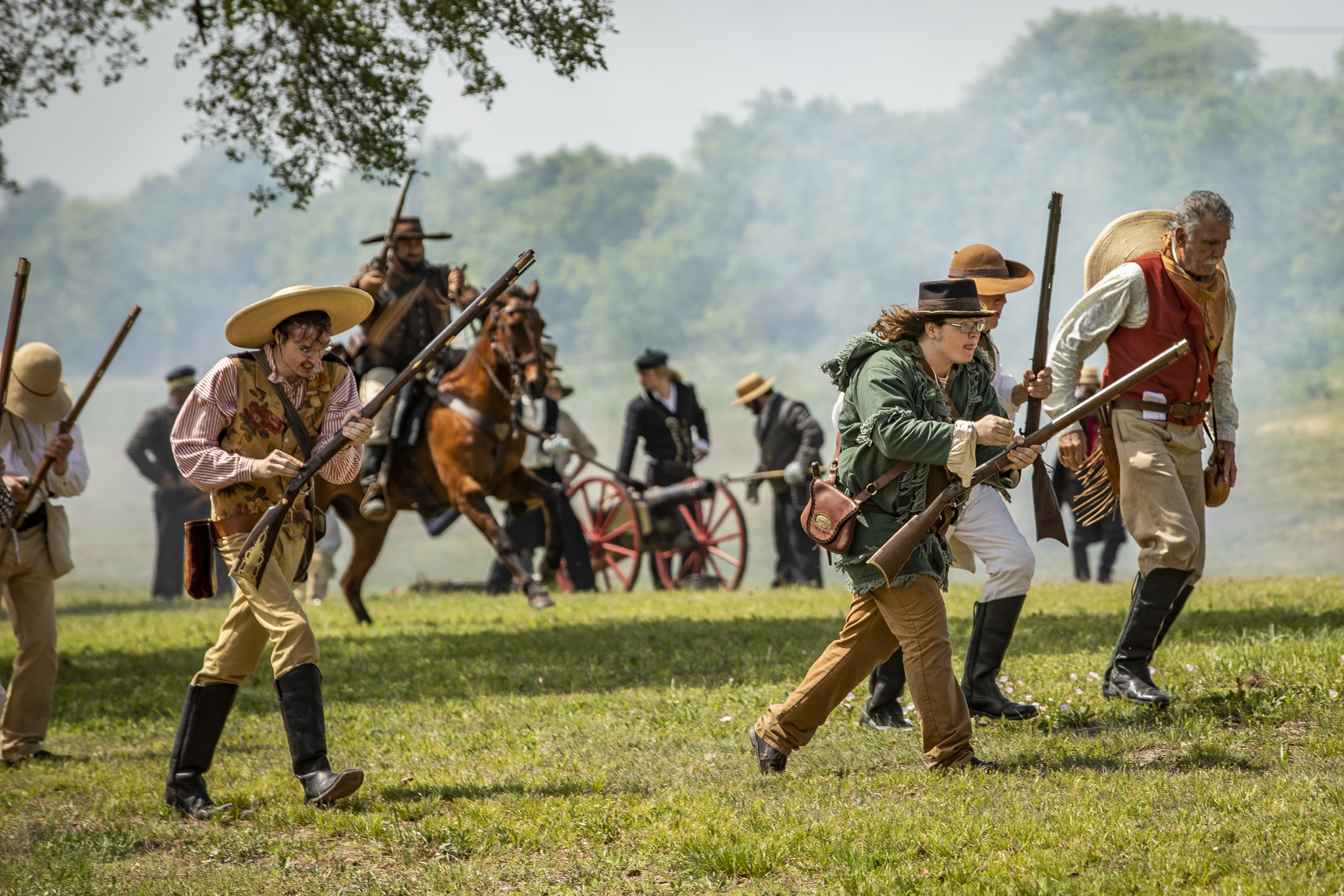
- Texian soldiers during the annual Battle of San Jacinto reenactment
- Observed by: Texas
- Significance: Battle of San Jacinto in 1836
- Date: April 21
- Next time: April 21, 2026
- Frequency: annual

San Jacinto Day is the celebration of the Battle of San Jacinto on April 21, 1836. It was the final battle of the Texas Revolution where Texas won its independence from Mexico.

It is an official "partial staffing holiday" in the State of Texas (state offices are not closed on this date).

An annual festival, which includes a reenactment, is held on the site of the battle. The Sabine Volunteers, a reenactment group from East Texas, participate in the San Jacinto Reenactment annually. This group is named for an actual militia group during the Texas Revolution. The reenactment group consists of four members and has appeared on the History Channel. A documentary entitled The Re-Enactors of San Jacinto, directed by Emmy-winner Allen Morris, was released in 2010 and shown on HoustonPBS. The documentary details the annual San Jacinto Day celebration and shows the reenactment of the 18 minute battle.

== See also ==
- Aggie Muster
- San Jacinto Monument
- Texas Independence Day
- Timeline of the Texas Revolution
