= Texas Independence Day =

Holiday on March 2

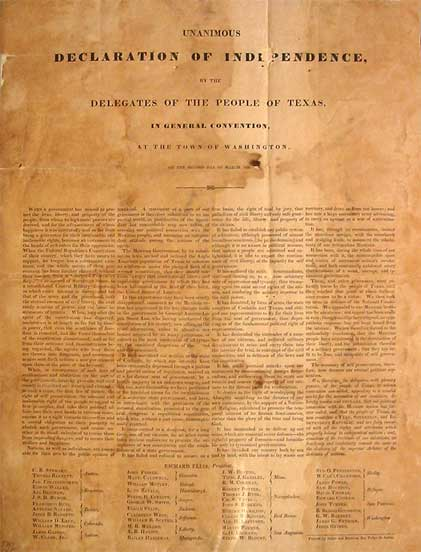
- The Texas Declaration of Independence
- Observed by: Texas
- Date: March 2
- Next time: March 2, 2027
- Frequency: Annual

Texas Independence Day is the celebration of the adoption of the Texas Declaration of Independence on March 2, 1836. With this document, signed by 59 delegates, settlers in Mexican Texas officially declared independence from Mexico and created the Republic of Texas.

It is not, however, an official state holiday whereby offices are closed, but instead a "partial staffing holiday": state offices are required to be open on that day but with reduced staffing.

== Background ==
Texas Independence day is a celebration of the adoption of the Texas Declaration of Independence. 59 Delegates signed the document in Washington on the Brazos, which is now referred to as the “birthplace of Texas,” and it made Mexican Texas into the Republic of Texas free from Mexican political influence. The Texas Declaration of Independence was based largely on the ideas of self government and natural rights from the American Declaration of Independence as well as the ideas of John Locke and other enlightenment figures.

The Declaration was in response to the Mexican Government and was issued during the Texas revolution.

The Convention President, Richard Ellis, appointed a committee to draft a declaration of Independence, and the committee chairman, George Childress, is credited with the authorship of the Texas Declaration of Independence with some help from the other committee members.

The day after the committee was created the Declaration was given to the convention to sign and over the following days 59 delegates for each of the settlements came to vote on the Declaration, and it was unanimously approved.

== Customs ==
Today, Texas Independence Day is celebrated on March second every year and it honors the adoption of the Texas Declaration of Independence passed in 1836 by a convention of settlers in the Texan area and it includes many forms of entertainment. The biggest celebrations on Texas Independence Day include historical reenactments and visits to major museums and memorials of famous battles and events in the Texan Revolution for Independence from Mexico. This includes battles such as the Battle of San Jacinto and the Alamo, as well as celebrations of Texan culture and life during the time of the revolution. Other celebrations of Texan culture are readings of famous Texan poems. Other events include a parade in Austin Texas as well as racing events and competitions in honor of Texas Independence Day. Rodeos are also held in Texas to celebrate the day as it pertains to Texan culture. Some firework displays are also present on this day. Events can also include music from live concerts along with performances and games such as Texas hold 'em. Other competitions include food competitions such as Chili cook offs and cigar rolling to celebrate the day, and in many restaurants and events, Texan food is served. Texans also participate in drinking and alcohol in Texas in honor of the day as well, and some stores also have sales and sweepstakes to honor the day. One notable celebration is in Huntsville Texas where visitors can be baptized a Texan by kneeling in front of Sam Houston's memorial and receive pond water across their forehead.

== Celebrations and Events ==
- Austin Texas Independence Day Parade: Contains floats and Paraders in attire based on Texas Independence day history.
- Celebration at the Alamo: A free admission event that contains historical reenactments of the battle and has live Texan music.
- Bastrop Museum and Visitor Center Texas Independence day event: A free admission event with readings of Texas poetry as well as a history tour of the museum.
- Natural Grocers annual Texas Independence day event: The Natural Grocers store in Texas puts more items on sale and holds sweepstakes events along with other free items.
- Dripping Springs Distilling Texas Independence Day Celebration: A celebration with live music, Texas hold 'em, and other Texan food and games.
- Culpepper Cattle Co. Texas Independence Day Event: Event with live music, pop-up vendor, and a drink special.
- Washington on the Brazos Texas Independence day event: A celebration with a chili cook-off as well as readings of Texan poems along with a reading of the Texas Declaration of Independence and Sons of the Republic Ceremony with talks and a gun salute.
- Haywire Texas Independence Day Event: A celebration with cigar rolling and live music.

== See also ==
- Timeline of the Texas Revolution
- San Jacinto Day
- Bibliography of the Texas Revolution, Republic, and Annexation
