= José Enrique de la Peña =

Jose Enrique de la Peña (1807-1840) was a colonel in the Mexican Army. Under General Antonio López de Santa Anna, de la Peña participated in the Battle of the Alamo.

In 1955, a book of his memoirs of the battle, 'With Santa Anna in Texas, was published in Spanish. The memoirs are controversial in that they said that Davy Crockett did not die fighting (as is the common belief), but instead surrendered (along with his Tennessee boys) during the battle of the Alamo and was later executed. Historians disagree on whether the memoirs are accurate.

== Life ==
De la Peña was born in Jalisco, Mexico in 1807. After training as a mining engineer, he entered the Mexican Navy in 1825, as a cadet first-class. Within two years he was promoted to second lieutenant, and in 1827 he requested an assignment as part of the Mexican Legation to a European country. The assignment was not granted. Between July and November 1828, he wrote a series of articles for El Sol. Published under the pseudonym "Lover of the Navy", the articles were highly critical of David Porter, the American-born commander of the Mexican navy. Later that year, de la Peña travelled to Veracruz to report for sea duty. During his journey he met Antonio López de Santa Anna, the commander of the state of Vera Cruz. De la Peña received Santa Anna's permission to remain in Jalapa rather than continue on to Veracruz. Under Santa Anna's command, he participated in the battle of Tampico, which drove Spanish invaders from Mexico.

In September 1829, de la Peña wrote several more articles critical of the Mexican navy. Rather than use a pseudonym, he signed the articles with his initials "JEP". At some point that year de la Peña was transferred into the service of General Melchor Múzquiz. Little is known of his life over the next several years. In 1830 he suffered from smallpox. The following year he attended military college to study arithmetic, algebra, speculative geometry, and plane trigonometry. After completing his studies, in October 1831 he was ordered to accompany students to Acapulco for shipboard duty. He did not follow the order, later explaining that he was ill. By the end of the year he reported for duty on the corvette Morales.

When Santa Anna assumed power in 1833 de la Peña requested a commission as a lieutenant colonel in the Mexican Army. He was granted a post as captain of a cavalry unit. In May 1833, he was assigned to a legation in London. Although he had requested such assignments for seven years, de la Peña did not wish to travel to London, whose climate and language he disliked. After unsuccessful attempts to change his assignment to France, de la Peña withdrew his request and instead asked to become a part of the Federal Division of the President. He was transferred to the Federal Division in December 1833, but in May 1834 he requested to be assigned to the Mexican Legation in the United States; this request was denied.

By the onset of the Texas Revolution in October 1835, de la Peña had been demoted to lieutenant and was a staff officer for the elite Zapadores Battalion. However, when the Mexican Army of Operations marched into Texas to subdue the revolution in January 1836, de la Peña was serving as an aide for Colonel Francisco Duque of the Toluca Battalion. The Toluca Battalion joined the rest of Santa Anna's army in San Antonio on March 4, 1836, eleven days after the siege of the Texas garrison in the Alamo Mission had begun. Santa Anna launched an assault on the Alamo in the early hours of March 6. Duque was assigned to lead one of the four assault columns, and he requested that de la Peña accompany him. De la Peña remained at the front until Duque fell wounded and then returned to the rear to find General Manuel Fernández Castrillón, second-in-command of that column. At least twice more de la Peña returned to the front lines to accept or deliver messages. His only wound was a serious bruise. After the Battle of the Alamo, de la Peña saw no further action. However, he saw campaign action till the end of the Texas war, till he arrived in Matamoros, Mexico, by the beginning of June 6, 1836. After Santa Anna was captured at the Battle of San Jacinto, de la Peña retreated with the rest of the Mexican army back to Mexico, arriving in Matamoros on June 6, 1836.

The Zapadores Battalion had an unfilled slot for a captain, and de la Peña was soon promoted to take that position. For the next few months de la Peña requested letters of combat commendations from other officers for his heroic actions during the Texas campaigns, receiving ones from Lieutenant Colonel Ampudia, Duque, Lieutenant Colonel Amat, and even from General Jose de Urrea, who had not been part of the battle of the Alamo. And all of them testified to his brave actions in the Alamo death fight, hence they all agreed to write recommendation affidavits testifying to De la Pena's brave conduct in the Alamo battle. In December 1836 de la Peña was in Mexico City, where he testified in the inquiry into the actions of General Vicente Filisola during the army's retreat from Texas. Filisola was accused of cowardice for ordering the Mexican army to Matamoros when there was no reason to do so. He claimed to have done this on orders from Santa Anna, who was a prisoner of the Texans. This action from both these men is surely unnatural; a general(Filisola) in the battlefield, obeying orders from his superior, who was a prisoner of the enemy. During this time, de la Peña wrote a newspaper articles criticizing Filisola, which he signed "An Admirer of Texas". Filisola knew that de la Peña had authored the article and the following week published a counterattack, referring to de la Peña as "Peñita". De la Peña then published a very long article defending himself and further criticizing Filisola. His letters of commendation were published in conjunction with the article. The articles also mentioned that de la Peña had kept a diary during his time in Texas.

De la Peña was promoted to lieutenant colonel by April 1837. That month, he was sent to Sonora, where he served under General Urrea. On January 7, 1838, de la Peña published a "fiery proclamation" exhorting his garrison in the District of Baroyecca to support liberty and Urrea. The following week he issued a similar proclamation, published in El Cosmopolita in the town of Los Alamos. De la Peña joined Urrea in an uprising to overthrow Santa Anna and restore the Constitution of 1824. While De la Pena was in Texas, he had kept a diary which was not published till 1955. It was located by researcher J. Sanchez Garza and subsequently translated into English by Carmen Perry of the Daughters of the Republic of Texas.

Imprisoned in 1838, following his involvement in the Urrea rising, De la Peña was freed in 1840 and discharged from military service. Suffering from poor health he is believed to have died shortly thereafter. There is no reference to his name in surviving records after that year.

== Alamo memoirs ==
While in prison, de la Peña wrote an article about some of his experiences fighting in Texas.

If those in the cultured countries name us savages and assassins, none more than general Santa Anna has given an occasion to this. In the Alamo he ordered the murder of a few unfortunates who had survived the catastrophe, and whom general Castrillón presented imploring his mercy. Among those had been a man who pertained to the natural sciences, whose love of it had conducted him to Texas, and who locked himself up in the Alamo not believing it safe by his quality of foreigner, when general Santa Anna surprised [San Antonio].

This article contained de la Peña's first mention of the execution of Texian survivors at the Alamo, but did not mention names of any of those executed and did not claim that de la Peña was an eyewitness. The article was never published and the original copies have been lost. Although a reprint survives, because of the lack of publication it is difficult to determine the authenticity of the documents.

In 1955, Jesús Sanchez Garza published a book called La Rebelion de Texas—Manuscrito Inedito de 1836 por un Ofical de Santa Anna purporting to be de la Peña's memoirs. Inedito means "unpublished" in Spanish, meaning that this was the first time the memoirs were publicly available. Garza self-published the book, which included the diary, 40 pages of introductory material on de la Peña and an additional 90 pages of supporting documents, including the only known copy of the article de la Peña wrote from prison. The book had little impact on historical research into the Alamo as it had only a limited printing in Spanish in Mexico, and many researchers did not know it existed. In 1975 the Texas A&M University Press published an English translation of the book, called With Santa Anna in Texas: A Personal Narrative of the Revolution. The English publication caused a scandal within the United States as it asserted that Crockett did not die in battle. Because the original book was self-published, no editor or publisher ever vetted its authenticity. Garza never explained how he gained custody of the documents or where they were stored after de la Peña's death.

Historian Bill Groneman, found it suspicious that Garza's compilation was published in 1955, at the height of interest in Crockett and the Alamo caused by Walt Disney's television series about Crockett's life. Groneman also points out that the journals are made up of several different types of paper from several different paper manufacturers, all cut down to fit. Historic illustrator Joseph Musso also questions the validity, also basing his suspicions on the timing of the diaries' release. However, James Crisp, a history professor from North Carolina State University, has studied the papers and is convinced they are genuine. In October 2001, in a Southwestern Historical Quarterly article, Dr. David B. Gracy II, and his science team, attested to the authenticity of De la Peña's work. This analysis found that the type of ink and paper used in the manuscript was used by the Mexican military in the 1830's, and that the handwriting matched that of de la Peña's in other archived Mexican military documents. The original manuscript, consisting of 200 loose pages, was auctioned in 1998 for $387,500. It now resides at the Center for American History at the University of Texas at Austin.

== Notes ==
Borroel, Roger, translator of many Mexican army/governmental documents of the Texas War of 1836, and researcher.
