= Antonio Gaona (general) =

- Born: 1793; Havana, Cuba
- Died: 1848 (aged 54–55); Mexico City, Mexico
- Military career
- Allegiance: Mexico
- Service years: 1807–1848
- Rank: General
- Conflicts: Texas Revolution; Pastry War; Battle of San Juan de Ulúa; Mexican–American War

Antonio Gaona (1793–1848) was a general in the Mexican army of the 19th century. He served under Mexican President Antonio López de Santa Anna during the Texas Revolution and Mexican–American War.

== Early life ==
Antonio Gaona was born in Cuba in 1793. He joined the Regiment Nuevo España in the early 1800s and was promoted to general in 1832.

== Texas Revolution ==
During the Texas Revolution, General Antonio Gaona joined Santa Anna on the 1836 invasion of Texas, which first journeyed to San Antonio de Bexar, and besieged the meager Texan forces garrisoned at the Alamo fort.

Gaona arrived in San Antonio on March 8, 1836, too late for the Battle of the Alamo. Gaona and the bulk of his troops were traveling in the rear of the Mexican convoy, along with General Vicente Filísola, who were transporting the provisions and heavy armaments.

On March 24, 1836, he was ordered by Santa Anna to take 800 men and sweep around from the north towards Mina, now called Bastrop and then follow to Nacogdoches by way of the Old San Antonio Road. Gaona would close the trap on Sam Houston's army, catching him on his eastward retreat. Gaona desperately searched for the Texas army, following the right bank of the Brazos River on its southernly course. However, the Texans would remain elusive and Gaona would see no major fighting.

In early April, his orders were urgently changed and Gaona was ordered to abandon his occupation of Bastrop and to promptly join up with Santa Anna's forces in San Felipe. However in his haste to reinforce Santa Anna, he lost his way somewhere between Bastrop and San Felipe. Gaona reached Old Fort on April 19, thus his men would not arrive in time to participate in the battle of San Jacinto. Gaona was ordered by Filisola to return to San Antonio and then to cross back into Mexico.

== Later life ==
In Mexico, Gaona was appointed as the commander of the fortress of San Juan de Ulúa. He was forced to surrender the fort to the French fleet on November 28, 1838, during the Pastry War. He later served in the Mexican–American War, where he was captured at the Battle of [sic] Napoluca (Nopalucan) on January 6, 1848. He later died in 1848.

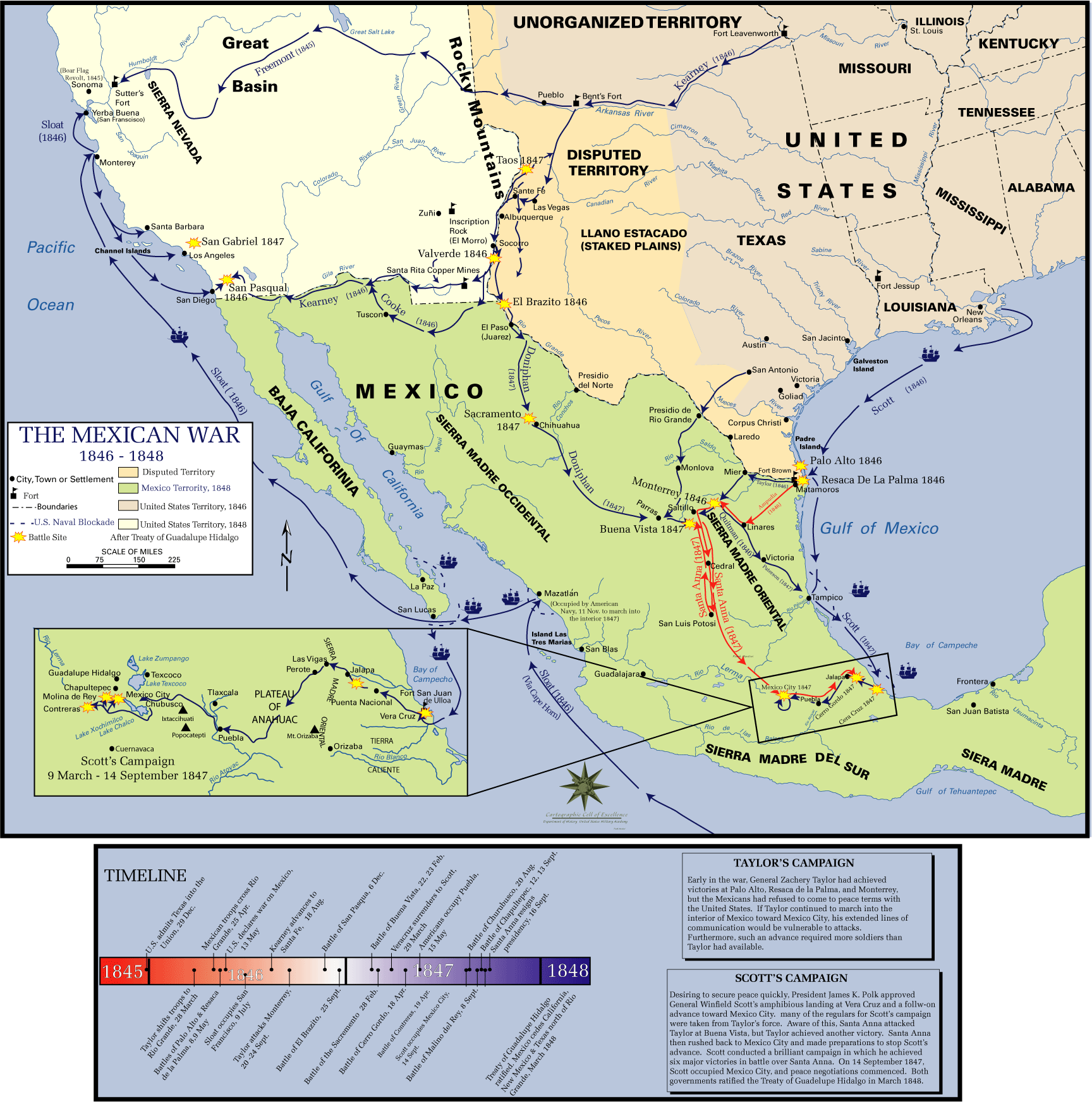
Overview map of the Mexican - American War

== See also ==
- Timeline of the Texas Revolution
