= Fort Bend =

1822 blockhouse in Fort Bend County, Texas

Coordinates: 29.5772°N 95.7517°W

Fort Bend was a blockhouse built in a large bend of the Brazos River in what is now Fort Bend County, Texas, to provide protection against Indian raids. It was erected in November 1822 by several members of Stephen F. Austin's Old Three Hundred, including William W. Little, Joseph Polley, William Smithers [Smeathers], Charles Beard, Henry Holster and is described as a "little log shanty". The location was reportedly selected by Austin, and a settlement soon grew up around the post. As the site provided one of the more favorable fords of the Brazos River, it became important during the Texas Revolution. The Fort Bend crossing was briefly defended in April 1836 by a rear guard detachment led by Wiley Martin. Where Mexican pickets forced the company of 46 men to retreat across the Ford after a short skirmish. After Martin was maneuvered out of the position, Gen. Antonio López de Santa Anna transported a portion of his Mexican army across the Brazos at the crossing. After Santa Anna's defeat at the battle of San Jacinto the site was used briefly by the Texas army. Troops under Thomas Jefferson Green, who were in pursuit of retreating Mexican forces led by Gen. Vicente Filisola, halted for a short time in mid-May 1836 at Fort Bend. Because Fort Bend had been the center of activity in the area its name was given to the county when it was established in 1837. The next year nearby Richmond, Texas was selected as the county seat and soon absorbed the smaller Fort Bend settlement. In 1936 the Texas Centennial Commission erected a monument to commemorate Fort Bend's role in the Texas Revolution.

== Bibliography ==
- Gerald S. Pierce, Texas Under Arms: The Camps, Posts, Forts, and Military Towns of the Republic of Texas (Austin: Encino, 1969).
- Harold Schoen, comp., Monuments Erected by the State of Texas to Commemorate the Centenary of Texas Independence Austin: Commission of Control for Texas Centennial Celebrations, 1938.
- Frank X. Tolbert, The Day of San Jacinto New York: McGraw-Hill, 1959.
- Clarence Wharton, Wharton's History of Fort Bend County (San Antonio: Naylor, 1939).
- The Handbook of Texas Online.
  - Texas Historical Marker: ""Marker Title: Fort Bend Address: US 90A City: Richmond County: Fort Bend Year Marker Erected: 1936 Marker Location: West bank of Brazos River

Marker Text: Built in November, 1821, by William Little, William Smithers, Charles Beard, Joseph Polly and Henry Holster. Its name was given to the county when created in 1837.
