= Timeline of the Texas Revolution =

This is a timeline of the Texas Revolution, spanning the time from the earliest independence movements of the area of Texas, over the declaration of independence from Spain, up to the secession of the Republic of Texas from Mexico.

The first shot of the Texas Revolution was fired at the Battle of Gonzales on October 2, 1835. This marked the beginning of the revolution. Over the next three months, the Texian colonists drove all Mexican army troops out of the province. . General Jose Urrea marched half of the troops up the Texas coast in the Goliad campaign, while Santa Anna led the rest of the troops to San Antonio de Bexar. After a thirteen-day siege, Santa Anna's army defeated the small group of Texians at the Battle of the Alamo and continued east. Many Texians, including the government, fled their homes in the Runaway Scrape. On March 19 the Texas troops marched into an open prairie outside of Goliad during a heavy fog. When they stopped to rest their animals, Urrea and his main army surrounded them. The Texas force numbered at least 300 soldiers, and the Mexicans had 300 to 500 troops. With no choice but battle, James Fannin chose to stand and fight near Coleto Creek. Santa Anna and his troops searched for the Texian government and the Texian army led by Sam Houston. On April 21, 1836, the Texans defeated Santa Anna's army at the Battle of San Jacinto; Santa Anna was captured the following day. The Mexican army retreated back to Mexico City, ending the Texas Revolution. Texas was now an independent colony and later joined the United States.

== Prelude to war: 1823–1834 ==
Year	Political events	Military events
1823	February 18 – Agustín de Iturbide approved Stephen F. Austin's colonization contract.; July – Austin establishes the town of San Felipe de Austin as his headquarters.; Mexico passes a law forbidding sale or purchase of slaves and requiring that the children of slaves be freed when they reached fourteen. Any slave introduced into Mexico by purchase or trade would also be freed.	
1824	October 4 – The Mexican Constitution of 1824 establishes a federal republic. Texas is combined with the province of Coahuila to form the new province Coahuila y Tejas.	
1825	Green DeWitt establishes a new colony in Texas, west of Austin's.; Haden Edwards establishes a colony in Texas, east of Austin's.; Martín De León establishes a colony in Texas, south of Austin's.	
1826	December 16 – Empresario Haden Edwards and 30 of his settlers declare themselves to be the independent Republic of Fredonia.	July – Comanches burn DeWitt's town to the ground.
1827	United States President John Quincy Adams offers to purchase Texas for $1 million. Mexican President Guadalupe Victoria declines the offer.; The legislature of Coahuila y Tejas outlawed the introduction of additional slaves into the state and granted freedom at birth to all children born to a slave. The new laws also stated that any slave brought into Texas should be freed within six months.	January 31 – Mexican forces and militiamen from the other colonies combined to drive Edwards from Texas.; DeWitt and his settlers rebuild their town, Gonzales.
1829	Slavery officially outlawed in Mexico. Fearing that the edict would cause widespread discontent, Austin tries to suppress its publication.; United States President Andrew Jackson again offers to purchase Texas, for $1 million. Mexican President Vicente Guerrero declines.	Mexican General Manuel Mier y Teran issues a report on the outcome of the colonization laws in Texas. It concluded that most Anglo Americans refused to be naturalized and tried to isolate themselves from Mexicans. He also noted that slave reforms passed by the state were being ignored. The report recommended new garrisons in Texas which could oversee the Anglo colonists and encourage Mexicans to resettle in the area.; July – Yucatan governor Antonio López de Santa Anna leads Mexican troops to repel an invasion by Spanish General Isidro Barradas. During the invasion, the Mexican Congress had granted war powers to Vicente Guerrero, making him essentially a dictator.
1830	April 6 – Mexican president Anastasio Bustamante signs a series of laws aimed at Texas. Among the actions taken were; an order for Texas to comply with the emancipation proclamation or face military intervention. To circumvent the law, many colonists converted their slaves into indentured servants for life. Others simply called their slaves indentured servants without legally changing their status.; rescinding the property tax law, which had exempted immigrants from paying taxes for ten years. He further increased tariffs on goods entering Mexico from the United States, causing their prices to rise.; Settlement contracts were brought under federal rather than state control. Colonies that did not have at least 150 inhabitants would be canceled.; Prohibited immigration from the United States to Texas. This measure was widely ignored; by 1834, it was estimated that over 30,000 Anglos lived in Texas, compared to only 7,800 Mexicans.	
1831	For protection, the political chief of the region grants Gonzales a small cannon.; Following Mier y Teran's recommendations, three garrisons are established in Texas. The presidio at Anahuac became the first port in Texas to collect customs. A second customs port, Fort Velasco, was established at the mouth of the Brazos River, while a third garrison established Fort Teran on the Neches River below Nacogdoches to combat smuggling and illegal immigration. The presidios are staffed with convicts.	
1832	A new provincial law prohibits worker contracts from lasting more than ten years.; October 1 – 55 political delegates meet at San Felipe de Austin for the Convention of 1832. The delegates drafted three petitions to the Congress of Mexico. They wished for an annulment of Article 11 of the colonization law of 1830, which prohibited foreign settlement as well as customs reform, recognition of squatters as valid immigrants, and a separate state for Texas.	June – The commander of the Anahuac garrison, Juan Davis Bradburn, angers the settlers by strictly enforcing the 1830 laws. The settlers elect Johnson as their commander. In the first of the Anahuac Disturbances, angry colonists attacked Bradburn's garrison to free imprisoned lawyers William Barret Travis and Patrick Churchill Jack.; June 26 – Colonel Domingo de Ugartechea, commander of the forces at Velasco, attempts to stop colonists from bringing a cannon up the Brazos River to assist in the attack on Anahuac. This begins the overnight Battle of Velasco, followed by the surrender of the Mexican troops the next day, and then several days of negotiation.; June 29 – Ugartechea signs a capitulation agreement with the Brazoria militia at Velasco.; July – Colonel Jose de las Piedras arrives in Anahuac with the garrison from Nacogdoches. As a result of negotiations with the settlers, the Turtle Bayou Resolutions were created, and Bradburn was removed from his post, ending the Disturbances.; August 2 – The Battle of Nacogdoches, All Mexican soldiers are driven from east Texas.
1833	March – The capital of Coahuila y Tejas is moved from Saltillo to Monclova, further removed from Texas.; April 1 – Santa Anna is elected president of Mexico.; April 1 – The Convention of 1833, with 56 political delegates, convenes. It appointed a commission to draft a constitution for a new state of Texas and chose Stephen F. Austin to represent Texas before the federal government.; November 21 – At Austin's urging, the Mexican Congress repeals the ban on foreign settlement in Texas.	
1834	January – Stephen F. Austin arrested in Saltillo on suspicion of treason. No charges were ever formally filed against him.; March – Texas was granted more representation in the provincial government. Trial by jury was introduced, and English was authorized as a second language.; Santa Anna rescinds the Mexican Constitution of 1824. As the national congress attempted to centralize the nation, a civil war ensued. Saltillo declared that Monclova had been the capitol illegally and appointed their own governor.	

== 1835 ==
Month	Political Events	Military Events
January	Stephen F. Austin published his Exposition to the Public Regarding the Affairs of Texas. In this document he explained that Texas wanted to be a separate [Mexican] state, not an independent nation.	
May	25 – Fearing that Santa Anna would march against Coahuila after subduing the rebels in Zacatecas, federalist governor Agustín Viesca disbanded the state legislature in Monclova. Viezca traveled towards Texas, intending to set up a new government in the more remote San Antonio. He was arrested en route.	Centralist elements of the Mexican army invaded the capital, Saltillo, and dissolved the state government.
June		20 – In the second of the Anahuac Disturbances, William Barret Travis led a militia to free colonists who had been arrested in a customs dispute. The Mexican troops surrendered and were expelled from the province.
July	The political chief of the Nacogdoches region told the militias to take arms against the Mexican troops.; "Texas Committees" in the United States organized to send money and volunteers to Texas.	
August	Austin arrives in Texas and resumes his position as civil head of Anglo-American Texas.	
September	8 – Austin reverses himself and calls for war with Mexico to secure the freedom of Texas.; 28 – Juan Seguín, Salvador Flores, Manuel Flores and a group of Béxar locals hold a meeting near Floresville, Texas and declare their support and readiness to take up arms in favor of a revolution.	1 – Correo-San Felipe affair. Texas armed schooner San Felipe exchanges fire with and captures Mexican Navy armed schooner Correo de Majica with help of small steamer Laura. Arguably the first shots in the conflict.; 20 – General Martin Perfecto de Cós, lands at Copano with an advance force of 300 troops and marches toward Goliad.; 28 – Albert Martin is selected as Captain of the Gonzales "Old 18" defenders.; 29 – Mexican Lieutenant Francisco de Castañeda and 100 dragoons arrive near Gonzales to force the settlers to return the cannon they had been given in 1831.
October	3 – Santa Anna abolishes all state legislatures.	2 –; The Battle of Gonzales officially begins the Texas Revolution. The Texian settlers retained their cannon; Castañeda and his men retreated.; Cós occupies Goliad and awaits the arrival of 450 reinforcements from the Morelos battalion.; Cós sends Capt. Manuel Sabriego and twenty-five men to Guadalupe Victoria, Texas to seize their cannon and arrest José María Jesús Carbajal. Alcalde Plácido Benavides leads the militia of Victoria; The settlers retained their cannon.; 5 – Cós departs for San Antonio, leaving a residual force of about 30 men in Goliad.; 10 – The Battle of Goliad, afterwards Texians occupy the presidio at Goliad.; 11 – Austin is elected commander of the Texian volunteers. The army begins marching towards San Antonio.; 14 – Philip Dimmitt takes command of the militia that remain to guard Presidio La Bahia.; 27 – Austin sends James Bowie, James Fannin and Juan Seguín with 90 men to scout for a base of operations from which to launch a siege. Despite orders to return that day, Bowie and his men camp overnight on the grounds of Mission Nuestra Señora de la Purísima Concepción de Acuña.; 28 – 400 Mexican troops attack Bowie and his men. The Battle of Concepcion ended with a Mexican retreat.
November	3 – The Consultation meets in San Felipe de Austin to decide the overall goals of the revolution that was underway. The group does not declare independence, and affirms their intention of restoring the Constitution of 1824.; 7 – The Consultation declares the right to form a new independent state and government as long as the 1824 Constitution of Mexico was not valid in Mexico.; 14 – Henry Smith is named Governor.; 14 – The new provisional government elects Austin, William H. Wharton and Branch T. Archer, to serve as commissioners to the United States.	1 – The Texians begin the Siege of Bexar.; 3 – Texians capture Fort Lipantitlan.; 14 – The Consultation names Sam Houston commander-in-chief of a regular Texas Army, with no authority over Huston's volunteers.; 15 – José Antonio Mexía attacks Tampico. When expected help does not arrive from federalists in Matamoros, he retreats to Texas and promotes an attack on Matamoros.; 24 The Texas Army volunteers elect Colonel Edward Burleson as commander in chief to replace departing Stephen F. Austin; 26 – Bowie leads Texians in the Grass Fight.; 28 – Santa Anna leaves Mexico City with a 6,000-strong Mexican Army, marching northward to take back Texas from the rebels.
December	30 – Santa Anna receives declaration from Mexican Congress that all foreigners taken in arms against the government should be treated as pirates and shot.	1 – Edward Burleson commissioned as commander of the volunteer army by the provisional government.; 5 – Under Ben Milam and Frank Johnson, Texians launch an assault on San Antonio.; 7 – Fannin commissioned as a colonel in the regular army by Houston. Neill commissioned as a lieutenant colonel of artillery in the regular army by the provisional government.; 8 – Colonel Domingo Ugartechea returns to San Antonio with over 500 reinforcements to aid General Cós.; 10 – General Cós surrenders over 1,000 Mexican troops and the Alamo to Texian forces at San Antonio. Cós and his men are paroled to Mexico under a promise to not fight against the Texians again.; 12 – Houston issues a proclamation to recruit a Regular Texas Army.; 15 – Edward Burleson resigns command. Most volunteers return home for Christmas. Frank W. Johnson assumes command of remaining militia.; 17 – Sam Houston is ordered by the Texas Governor Henry Smith to attack Matamoros. Houston delegates the orders to James Bowie for the attack of Matamoros.; 29 – James Bowie's order to attack Matamoros is confirmed by the U.S. General Council.1835 the Texas revolution

== 1836 ==
Date	Political Events	Military Events
January 5		James Grant and Frank Johnson are ordered by the Texas General Council to attack Matamoros. They strip the Alamo fort of most of its remaining men and supplies. The few left to support the Alamo fort select James C. Neill as their commander.
January 6		Santa Anna arrives at Saltillo.
January 7		James Walker Fannin is ordered by the Texas General Council to attack Matamoros.
January 11		James Bowie and William Blowout arrive at Goliad to support a Matamoros expedition.
January 14		Sam Houston arrives at Goliad to seize control of the Matamoros expedition.; J.C. Neill, commander of 78 men at the Alamo, pleads for supplies.; Philip Dimmitt, commandant at Presidio La Bahia, resigns his post and heads for Gonzales, after James Grant strips Goliad of its supplies. Peyton S. Wyatt assumes command.
January 19		James Bowie and James Bonham arrive at the Alamo fort with 30 men. Houston orders Francis W. Thornton to command at Goliad.
January 21		Sam Houston arrives at Refugio to control the Matamoros expedition.
February 1	Elections are held in settlements across Texas for an independence convention.	
February 2		James Bowie pleads to Smith for supplies. Fannin arrives with troops at Copano, Texas to aid the Matamoros Expedition.
February 3		William Travis arrives at the Alamo fort with 30 men.
February 4		Fannin and troops march to Refugio to link up with Grant and Johnson.
February 7		Fannin at Refugio and is elected colonel of the volunteer troops who will gather around Goliad. Fannin receives information of a Mexican advance upon Texas and an awaiting ambush at Matamoros. He abandons a Matamoros expedition.
February 8		David Crockett arrives in Bexar, near the Alamo with 12 men.
February 9		James Grant and Frank Johnson continue on their Matamoros Expedition, gathering horses around San Patricio and South Texas.
February 11		Alamo commander J.C. Neill leaves the Alamo command due to a family illness. He appoints Travis commander.
February 12		James Fannin leaves Refugio with his troops and assumes command at Presidio La Bahia in Goliad.
February 13		Santa Anna and his army reach the city of Guerrero.; Urrea reinforces Matamoros and marches toward San Patricio and South Texas.
February 14		Travis and Bowie agree upon joint command of the Alamo's forces.
February 16		Santa Anna crosses the Rio Grande.
February 17		Travis sends out letters pleading for men and supplies. General José de Urrea crosses the Rio Grande.
February 21		Santa Anna arrives at the Medina River.
February 22		Heavy rains swell the Medina and spoil a surprise attack by Sesma's cavalry.
February 23		Santa Anna enters San Antonio with generals Sesma, Amador and Castrillón and the Vanguard Brigade.; The Alamo fort comes under artillery fire from Mexican troops.; The siege of the Alamo begins.
February 24		Travis writes his famous "To the People of Texas & all Americans in the world" letter.; Bowie becomes ill.
February 25		Fannin, commander of troops at Goliad, receives Travis' plea for aid. Fannin orders Chenoweth to abandon Copano and sends his company to hold the Cibolo in anticipation of Fannin's relief march to aid the Alamo defenders.
February 26		James Fannin attempts his relief march to the Alamo compound but turns back. R.M Williamson arrives in Gonzales to help organize the Alamo relief forces gathering there .
February 27		Mexican General José de Urrea attacks and defeats Frank Johnson and a small band of Texians at the Battle of San Patricio.
February 28		Juan Seguín and his relief forces waiting on the Cibolo Creek encounter the Goliad advance led by Francis L. DeSauque and John M. Chenoweth while near the Cibolo. They inform Seguin that Fannin was en route to relieve the Alamo defenders and should only be about two days away.
February 29	Houston arrives at Washington on the Brazos.	The Gonzales relief forces arrive on the Cibolo below Bexar.
March 1	The Convention of 1836 of elected delegates convenes at Washington-on-the-Brazos.	Thirty-two to sixty men from Gonzales of the "Gonzales Company of Mounted Volunteers" enter the Alamo at 1:00 A.M.
March 2	Texas Declaration of Independence is signed and the Republic of Texas is declared.; David G. Burnet is elected at interim president by the delegates.	Texians with James Grant are defeated at the Battle of Agua Dulce.; Cos arrives at the Alamo, just ahead of the First Brigade.
March 3		James B. Bonham arrives back at the Alamo telling Travis that Fannin was not coming.; Mexican Aldama, Toluca and Zapadores battalions arrive in San Antonio.
March 4	Sam Houston is appointed commander of all Texas forces.	Santa Anna holds a council of war with generals Joaquín Ramírez y Sesma, Martín Perfecto de Cos, Manuel F. Castrillón and Colonels Juan Almonte, Agustín Amat, Francisco Duque and Manuel Romero to plan the final assault.
March 5		Mexican artillery stops shelling the Alamo.; General Juan Valentín Amador formulates the plan to assault the Alamo.; Neill at Gonzales in command of 375 troops gathering there.
March 6	Travis's March 3 plea reaches Washington on the Brazos. Houston and his staff head for Gonzales.	Battle of the Alamo: the Alamo falls. Approximately 180-250 Texians, Tejanos, and Anglos die. The thirteen-day siege resulted in the deaths of all of its defenders, including William B. Travis, David Crockett, and Jim Bowie. Several civilians survived.
March 8	Fannin receives the news of the Texas Declaration of Independence.	Mexican Generals Antonio Gaona, Adrián Woll, Vicente Filisola, and Juan Arago arrive with artillery and the remainder of the First Brigade at the Alamo.; Houston orders Fannin with his command at Goliad and Neill with his command at Gonzales to go aid the Alamo defenders.
March 10		Mexican General Andrade arrives at the Alamo in San Antonio.; Edward Burleson at Gonzales is elected as an infantry colonel.
March 11		Houston arrives, takes command and begins his retreat from Gonzales precipitating the Runaway Scrape.; Houston orders Fannin to fall back from Goliad and to relocate at Victoria.; General Sesma departs for Gonzales.
March 12		Battle of Refugio begins: Amon B. King and his men are attacked by General Urrea, and Texian troops commanded by Lt. Col. William Ward are dispatched for relief.
March 13		Ward's troops arrive and the Mexicans are repelled, fighting continues.
March 14		After several hours of fighting, Amon King, William Ward and the Texians attempt to fall back to Victoria.
March 15		King's troops are captured by the Mexicans.
March 16		Amon King and 14 men are executed.; General Eugenio Tolosa and the 2nd Brigade arrive near the Alamo in San Antonio.
March 17		Albert C. Horton's scouts locate Col. Juan Morales nearing Goliad with the Jiménez and San Luis battalions.
March 18		Albert C. Horton's cavalry and Urrea's advance forces skirmish near Fort Defiance.
March 19		Fannin's command departs for Victoria.; Urrea learns of Fannin's departure and pursues.; Battle of Coleto: General Urrea halts Colonel James Fannin near Goliad.
March 20		Urrea receives reinforcements. Mexican troops now total near 1000. Fannin surrenders.
March 21		Battle of Copano: General Urrea captures the port of Copano. The Mexicans held on to the port until the end of the war, using it to obtain reinforcements and send the injured and prisoners to Mexico.
March 23		William Ward surrenders.
March 24		General Antonio Gaona departs Bexar on an eastward path towards Nacogdoches.
March 27		Goliad Massacre: James Fannin and nearly 400 Texians are executed by order of Santa Anna.; Houston and his army camp near San Felipe de Austin.
March 28		Houston orders Wiley Martin and Mosley Baker with Juan Seguín to guard his retreat thus delaying Santa Anna's army from crossing the Brazos River.
March 29 – 31		Santa Anna finally departs San Antonio de Bexar.; General Andrade is left in command with 1000 troops at Bexar.
April 5		General Antonio Gaona, upon new orders from Santa Anna and after an eight-day delay, abandons his occupation of Mina to proceed to San Felipe de Austin.
April 7		Santa Anna's army reaches San Felipe and is pinned down by Baker's men.
April 8		Santa Anna joins Ramirez y Sesma at Beason's Crossing.
April 12	David G. Burnet and his cabinet barely escape the arriving Mexican army. Colonel Almonte decides not to shoot the fleeing party.	Santa Anna crosses Fort Bend on the Brazos River.; Houston uses the boat Yellow Stone to cross the Brazos River.
April 15		Santa Anna and his army arrive at Harrisburg.
April 18		Houston and his army arrive outside of Harrisburg.
April 20		Texian and Mexican patrols clash at New Washington.; Houston moves his army to Buffalo Bayou; J.C. Neill is wounded and replaced by G.W. Hockley.; A cavalry attack led by Sidney Sherman engages the Mexican army.
April 21		Martín Perfecto de Cos arrives with 500 reinforcements to aid Santa Anna.; Battle of San Jacinto: Texian army under Sam Houston overwhelmingly defeats Mexican force under Santa Anna, securing Texas independence.
April 22		Santa Anna captured.
April 23		News of Santa Anna's defeat and capture reaches Santa Anna's second-in-command, General Vicente Filisola.
April 25		All Mexican troops in Texas (2,573 men) assemble at Elizabeth Powell's Tavern near Old Fort, including General José de Urrea's troops, where in a council of war headed by Filisola, they agree to withdraw south of the Colorado River.
April 28		Retreating Mexican army crosses the Colorado River at the Atascosito Crossing near present-date Columbus, Texas. Because of heavy rains and dwindling food and supplies, the Mexicans continue to withdraw south.
May 10		Mexican army reaches the Atascosita Road at Victoria.
May 14		Treaties of Velasco signed by Republic of Texas officials and General Santa Anna.
May 17		Mexican army arrives in Goliad.
May 28		Lead elements of Mexican army arrive in San Patricio.
May 31		Mexican army arrives on the west bank of the Nueces River.
June 4		Mexican army at the Alamo fort formally surrenders to Juan Seguín, military chief of San Antonio.
June 5 – June 12		Mexican army camps at Rancho Chiltipiquin. Extreme heat from the summer season forces the army to further move on.
June 15		Filisola, leading the defeated and demoralized Mexican army, crosses the Rio Grande back into Mexico and arrives later that day at Matamoros, Tamaulipas.
