= USS San Jacinto =

Three ships of the United States Navy have been named USS San Jacinto, after the Texas battle of San Jacinto in 1836, and the navy considered acquiring a fourth ship of the name:

- The first USS San Jacinto (1850) was an early screw frigate of the navy, launched in 1850. She bombarded the Taku Forts in support of British and French troops on the ground during the Second Opium War and was active during the American Civil War, but wrecked at the beginning of 1865. The ship is also known for its role in the Trent Affair.
- The US Navy considered acquiring a civilian passenger-cargo ship, SS San Jacinto, for use during World War I as USS San Jacinto (ID-1531), but never acquired or commissioned her.
- The second USS San Jacinto (CVL-30) was a light aircraft carrier that saw action in the latter half of World War II and was decommissioned in 1947.
- The third USS San Jacinto (CG-56) was a guided missile cruiser commissioned in 1988, and decommissioned in 2023.
