= Joaquín Ramírez y Sesma =

Joaquín Ramírez y Sesma (fl. 1835–1836) was a 19th-century general for the Republic of Mexico.

Sesma commanded the brigade sent in advance of the main body of Antonio López de Santa Anna's main body of troops that were heading to put down the rebellion in the Mexican state of Texas. His orders were to relieve Gen. Martín Perfecto de Cos in San Antonio, but news of Cos's surrender (December 1835) and retreat to Laredo (Mexico) reached Mexican authorities shortly after Ramírez's departure. Ramírez joined Cos at Laredo with 1,000 infantry and 500 cavalry.

Santa Anna linked up with them at the Rio Grande. Together the troops advanced to San Antonio, where they seized the Alamo on March 6, 1836, after a thirteen-day siege. On March 11, Sesma was ordered to go with Gen. Adrián Woll to San Felipe de Austin and then to Anahuac. On March 24, his orders were changed, and he was instructed to support the left wing of José de Urrea's forces, but the resistance encountered at Beeson's Ford on the Colorado River caused Sesma and Woll to camp on the south bank of the river about two miles from the Texas forces on the opposite side. Santa Anna then proceeded with an advance detachment, and Ramírez followed at a distance.

He began crossing his troops over the Brazos River at Thompson's Ferry on April 13 with orders to continue toward Harrisburg. At the time of the Battle of San Jacinto, Sesma was encamped on the right bank of the Brazos near the Old Fort settlement. He joined Vicente Filisola and the other Mexican generals on April 25 and accompanied the troops in the general Mexican retreat.

== See also ==
- Timeline of the Texas Revolution
