= Manuel Fernández Castrillón =

Mexican Army officer (1780–1836)

Major-General Manuel Fernández Castrillón (c. 1780 – April 21, 1836) was a Mexican Army officer who served in the Texas Revolution. A close friend of President Antonio López de Santa Anna, Castrillón frequently advocated merciful treatment for captured Texian soldiers. He was killed in action at the 1836 Battle of San Jacinto, despite attempts by Thomas Jefferson Rusk to save his life.

== Early life ==
Manuel Fernández Castrillón was born in either Cuba or Spain. Although he was originally a member of a Spanish force attempting to subdue the Mexican rebels during the Mexican War of Independence, Castrillón soon switched sides and served with the Mexican independence forces. He served under Mexican General Antonio López de Santa Anna in an 1822 battle for Veracruz, and again later as Santa Anna worked to quell various rebellions.

== Texas Revolution ==
During the Texas Revolution, Castrillón served as Santa Anna's aide-de-camp.

=== Battle of the Alamo ===
He joined Santa Anna on the 1836 invasion of Texas, which first journeyed to San Antonio de Bexar, and besieged the small Texan force garrisoned at the Alamo. Castrillón often argued against Santa Anna's decision to immediately assault the Alamo, advocating instead that the Mexican army wait for the arrival of the heavier cannon that would reduce the Alamo walls to rubble.

On March 6, 1836, during the final assault of the Alamo, Castrillón took command of the Toluca Battalion after Colonel Francisco Duque was wounded. This column attacked the north wall of the Alamo. According to the diary of José Enrique de la Peña, after the Mexican victory at the Battle of the Alamo, Castrillón brought before Santa Anna six or seven Texians who he had taken prisoner during the final Alamo assault. Historian Edmondson speculates that these men may have been sick and unable to participate in the fighting; other historians have theorized that the prisoners may have included Davy Crockett, who Castrillón spared when the final small band of Texians was overwhelmed. Castrillón petitioned that their lives be spared. Santa Anna had stated that no prisoners would be taken and ordered the Texians executed on the spot. Weeks later, during the Goliad Massacre, Fernández Castrillón also protested – in vain – the execution of nearly 400 Texian prisoners, including their leader, James Fannin.

After the Battle of the Alamo, the Mexican army moved east into the more settled areas of Texas.

=== Battle of San Jacinto ===
Castrillón saw no further fighting until April 21, 1836, when Texas General Sam Houston launched a surprise attack on Mexican forces at the Battle of San Jacinto.

As Texian forces jumped the makeshift barricades surrounding the Mexican army encampment, Castrillón, Santa Anna, and Colonel Juan Almonte all began shouting orders, some contradictory, in the hopes of rallying their troops to mount a defense. Castrillón took charge of the men operating the army's single cannon, the "Golden Standard". Within a few moments, most of the Mexican artillerymen had been killed by Texian riflemen. The surviving troops fled, shouting at Castrillón to join them. According to reports from survivors of the battle, Castrillón shouted back that "I have been in forty battles and never showed my back. I am too old to do it now." He then turned back to the cannon.

His bravery impressed Thomas J. Rusk, the acting Secretary of the War for the new Republic of Texas government. Rusk rode along the Texian lines, shouting at his men to spare the general. At one point, he knocked aside rifles that were trained on Castrillón. His efforts were in vain; other Texian troops rode straight past Rusk and shot and killed Castrillón. Many Texians held Castrillón as a hero who chose to fight when he could have run. Santa Anna, however, later decried Castrillón as an incompetent fool whose actions led to the Mexican defeat.

Castrillón's body was claimed by his friend Lorenzo de Zavala, a member of the Republic of Texas cabinet, and buried in the nearby de Zavala family cemetery.

== See also ==
- Timeline of the Texas Revolution
