= History of slavery in Texas =

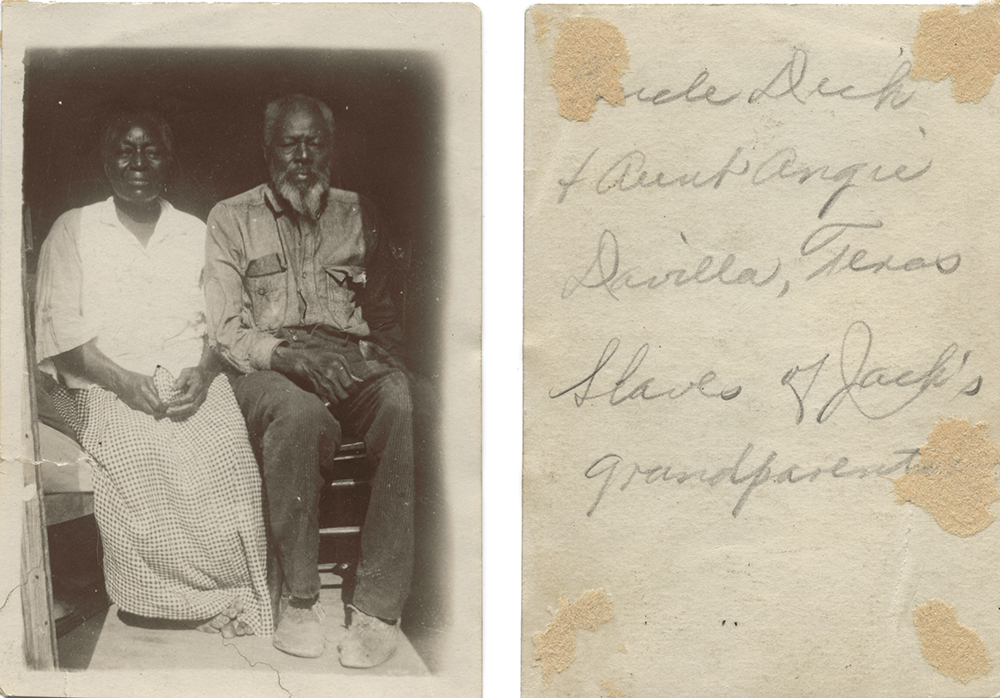
"Uncle Dick and Aunt Angie, Davilla, Texas, slaves of Jack's grandparents" (DeGolyer Library, Southern Methodist University)

The history of slavery in Texas began slowly at first during the first few phases in Texas' history. Texas was a colonial territory, then part of Mexico, later Republic in 1836, and U.S. state in 1845. The use of slavery expanded in the mid-nineteenth century as White American settlers, primarily from the Southeastern United States, crossed the Sabine River and brought enslaved people with them. Slavery was present in Spanish America and Mexico prior to the arrival of American settlers, but it was not highly developed, and the Spanish did not rely on it for labor during their years in Spanish Texas.

The issue of slavery became a source of contention between the Anglo-American settlers and Spanish governors. The governors feared the growth in the Anglo-American population in Texas, and for various reasons, by the early 19th century, they and their superiors in Mexico City disapproved of expanding slavery. In 1829 the Guerrero decree conditionally abolished slavery throughout Mexican territories. It was a decision that increased tensions with slave-holders among the Anglo-Americans.

After the Texas Revolution ended in 1836, the Constitution of the Republic of Texas made slavery legal. Sam Houston made illegal importation from Mexico a crime in 1836. The General Provisions of the Constitution forbade any owner of enslaved people from freeing them without the consent of Congress and forbade Congress from making any law that restricted the slave trade or emancipating slaves.

Americans of European extraction and enslaved people contributed greatly to the population growth in the Republic and State of Texas. Settlements grew and developed more land under cultivation in cotton and other commodities. The cotton industry flourished in East Texas, where enslaved labor became most widely used. The central part of the state was dominated by subsistence farmers. Free and runaway African Americans had great difficulty finding jobs in Texas. Many worked in other parts of the state as cowboys herding cattle or migrated for better opportunities in the Midwest, California, or southward to Mexico.

== Early slavery ==
The first known non-Native slave in Texas was Estevanico, a Moor from North Africa who had been captured and enslaved by the Spanish when he was a child. Estevanico accompanied his enslaver Captain Andrés Dorantes de Carranza on the Narváez expedition, which landed at present-day Tampa. Trying to get around the Gulf Coast, they built five barges, but in November 1528 these went aground off the coast of Texas. Estevanico, Dorantes, and Alonso Castillo Maldonado, the only survivors, spent several months living on a barrier island (now believed to be Galveston Island) before making their way in April 1529 to the mainland. American Indians captured and enslaved the party, putting them to work as laborers. They survived with the help of Castillo's faith healing among the Indians. Later they were joined by Álvar Núñez Cabeza de Vaca. Five years later, in September 1534, they escaped to the interior. Although Estevanico was still enslaved, after these events the Spaniards treated him more as an equal. Later he was given leadership of a Spanish expedition. His account, along with those of the others, led to more extensive Spanish exploration of the new territory.

== Slavery in colonial times ==
Both the civil and religious authorities in Spanish Texas officially encouraged freeing enslaved people, but the laws were often ignored. Beginning in the 1740s in the Southwest, when Spanish settlers captured American Indian children, they often had them baptized and "adopted" into the homes of townspeople. There they were raised to be servants. At first, the practice involved primarily Apaches; eventually Comanche children were likewise "adopted" as servants.

Importation of enslaved Africans was not widespread in Spanish Texas. In 1751, after three Frenchmen were found to have settled along the Trinity River to trade with the American Indians, the Spanish arrested and expelled them from the colony. A 1777 census of San Antonio showed a total of 2,060 people, with 151 of African descent. Of these, only 15 were enslaved, 4 males and 11 females. The 1783 census for all of Texas listed a total of 36 enslaved people. There was intermarriage among blacks, Indians, and Europeans. In 1792 there were 34 blacks and 414 mulattos in Spanish Texas, some of whom were free men and women. This was 15 percent of the total 2,992 people living in Spanish Texas.

When the United States purchased Louisiana in 1803, Spain declared that any enslaved person who crossed the Sabine River into Texas would be automatically freed. For a time, many enslaved ran away to Texas. Free blacks also emigrated to Texas. Most escapees joined friendly American Indian tribes, but others settled in the East Texas forests. When some French and Spanish slaveholders moved to Texas, they were allowed to retain their enslaved people. In 1809, the Commandant General of the Interior Provinces, Nemesio Salcedo, ordered the Texas-Louisiana border to be closed to everyone, regardless of ethnic background. His nephew, governor of Texas Manuel María de Salcedo, interpreted the order as allowing slaveholders from the United States to enter Texas to reclaim runaways.

The United States outlawed the importation of enslaved people in 1808, but domestic trade flourished, especially in New Orleans during the antebellum decades. In part due to the trade in enslaved people, New Orleans was the fourth largest city in the US in 1840 and one of the wealthiest. Between 1816 and 1821, Louis-Michel Aury and Jean Lafitte smuggled enslaved people into the United States through Galveston Island. To encourage citizens to report unlawful activity, most southern states allowed anyone who informed on a slave trader to receive half of what the imported enslaved people would earn at auction. The men sold enslaved people to James Bowie and others, who brought them directly to a customhouse and informed on themselves. The customs officers offered the enslaved people for auction, and Bowie would buy them back. Due to the state laws, he would receive half of the price he had paid. After that, he could legally transport the enslaved people and sell them in New Orleans or areas further up the Mississippi River.

== Mexican Texas ==
In 1821 at the conclusion of the Mexican War of Independence, Texas was included in the new nation. That year, the American Stephen F. Austin was granted permission by Mexican authorities to bring Anglo settlers into Texas. Most of the settlers Austin recruited came from the southern slave-owning portions of the United States. Under Austin's development scheme, each settler was allowed to purchase an additional 50 acres (20 ha) of land for each enslaved person he brought to the territory. At the same time, however, Mexico offered full citizenship to free blacks, including land ownership and other privileges. The province continued to attract free blacks and escaped enslaved people from the Southern United States. Favorable conditions for free blacks continued into the 1830s.

In 1823, Mexico forbade the sale or purchase of people, and required that the children of the enslaved be freed when they reached age fourteen. By 1825, however, a census of Austin's Colony showed 1,347 Anglo-Americans and 443 people of African descent, including a small number of free blacks. In 1827, the legislature of Coahuila y Tejas outlawed the introduction of additional enslaved people and granted freedom at birth to all children born to an enslaved person.

In 1829, Mexico abolished slavery, but it granted an exception until 1830 to Texas. That year, Mexico made the importation of enslaved people illegal. Anglo-American immigration to the province slowed at this point, with settlers angry about the changing rules. To circumvent the law, numerous Anglo-American colonists converted their enslaved people to indentured servants, but with life terms. Others simply called their enslaved people indentured servants without legally changing their status. Slaveholders trying to enter Mexico would force the people they enslaved to sign contracts claiming that they owed money and would work to pay the debt. The low wages the enslaved person would receive made repayment impossible, and the debt would be inherited, even though no enslaved person would receive wages until age eighteen. In 1832, the state passed legislation prohibiting worker contracts from lasting more than ten years.

Many enslaved people who escaped from slaveholders in Texas or in the United States joined various East Texas Indian tribes. Although not considered equals in the tribes, they were generally treated well. Many former enslaved people fought with the Cherokee against the Texan army that drove the tribe from East Texas in 1838. Enslaved people often fought against the Comanche tribe, however. The Comanche indiscriminately killed enslaved people and their white owners during raids. The Comanche sold any captured enslaved people to the Cherokee and Creek in Indian Territory, as they were both slaveholding tribes.

By the 1800s, most enslaved people in Texas had been brought by slaveholders from the United States. A small number of enslaved were imported illegally from the West Indies or Africa. In the 1830s, the British consul estimated that approximately 500 enslaved people had been illegally imported into Texas. By 1836, there were approximately 5,000 enslaved people in Texas.

Exportation in the slave-owning areas of the state surpassed that of the non-slave-owning areas. A survey of Texas in 1834 found that the department of Bexar, which was mostly made up of Tejanos, had exported no goods. The Brazos department, including Austin's colonies and those of Green DeWitt, had exported 600,000 pesos worth of goods, including 5,000 bales of cotton. The department of Texas, which included the eastern settlements, expected to export 2,000 bales of cotton and 5,000 head of cattle.

The abolition of slavery created tensions between the Mexican government and slave-holding settlers from the United States. These tensions came to a head in the Anahuac Disturbances. In August 1831, Juan Davis Bradburn, the military commander of the customs station on Upper Galveston Bay, gave asylum to two men who had escaped from slavery in Louisiana. The slaveholder hired William Barret Travis, a local lawyer, in an attempt to retrieve the men. When Bradburn arrested Travis on suspicion of plotting an insurrection, settlers rebelled. The disturbances were resolved through a combination of arms and political maneuvering. One result was the Turtle Bayou Resolutions, which were an explanation of the grievances that had led to the disturbances. One of the resolutions challenged Bradburn for "advising and procuring servants to quit the service of their masters, and offering them protection; causing them to labor for his benefits, and refusing to compensate them for the same."

== Republic ==
As the Texas Revolution began in 1835, some enslaved people sided with Mexico, which provided for freedom. In the fall of 1835, a group of almost 100 enslaved people staged an uprising along the Brazos River after they heard rumors of approaching Mexican troops. Whites in the area defeated and severely punished them. Several enslaved people ran away to serve with Mexican forces. Texan forces executed one runaway taken prisoner and resold another into slavery. Other enslaved people joined the Texan forces, with some killed while fighting Mexican soldiers. Three enslaved people were known to be at the Battle of the Alamo; a boy named John was killed, while William B. Travis's enslaved person, Joe, and James Bowie's enslaved person, Sam, survived to be freed by the Mexican Army.

The Section 9 of the General Provisions of the Constitution of the Republic of Texas, ratified in 1836, made slavery legal again in Texas and defined the status of the enslaved and people of color in the Republic of Texas.

- People of color who had been servants for life under Mexican law would become property.
- Congress should pass no law restricting emigrants from bringing their enslaved people into Texas.
- Congress shall not have the power to emancipate enslaved people.
- Slaveowners may not free their enslaved servants without Congressional approval unless the freed people leave Texas.
- Free persons of African descent were required to petition the Texas Congress for permission to continue living in the country.
- Africans and the descendants of Africans and Indians were excluded from the class of 'persons' having rights.

The following year all those who had been living in Texas at the time of independence were allowed to remain. On the other hand, the legislature created political segregation; it classified free residents with at least 1/8 African heritage (the equivalent to one great-grandparent) as a separate category, and abrogated their citizens' rights, prohibiting them from voting, owning property, testifying against whites in court, or intermarrying with whites. As planters increased cotton production, they rapidly increased the purchase and transport of enslaved workers. By 1840 there were 11,323 enslaved people in Texas.

== Statehood ==
In 1845 the state legislature passed legislation further restricting the rights of free blacks. For example, it subjected them to punishments, such as working on road gangs if convicted of crimes, similar to those of enslaved rather than free men.

By 1850, the enslaved population in Texas had increased to 58,161; in 1860 there were 182,566 enslaved, 30 percent of the total population. Texas ranked 10th in total enslaved population and 9th in percentage enslaved (30 percent of all residents).

Forty percent of Texas's enslaved people lived on plantations along the Gulf Coast and in the East Texas river valleys, where they cultivated cotton, corn, and some sugar. Fifty percent of the enslaved people worked either alone or in groups of fewer than 20 on small farms ranging from the Nueces River to the Red River, and from the Louisiana border to the edge of the western settlements of San Antonio, Austin, Waco, and Fort Worth. Some enslaved people lived among the cattlemen along the southern Gulf Coast and helped herd sheep and cattle. Rarely, an enslaved person also broke horses, but generally only white men were used for that dangerous task. If they died, the boss did not suffer a monetary loss. Enslaved people were not held between the Nueces River and the Rio Grande. A large supply of cheap Mexican labor in the area made the purchase and care of a slave too expensive.

Although most enslaved people lived in rural areas, more than 1000 resided in both Galveston and Houston by 1860, with several hundred in other large towns. Unlike in most southern cities, the number of urban enslaved people in Texas grew throughout the 1850s. Most worked as house servants or on farms on the edges of towns, but others served as cooks and waiters in hotels, as teamsters or boatmen, or as coachmen and skilled artisans, such as blacksmiths, carpenters, and barbers.

Plantation enslaved people generally lived in one or two-room log cabins. Most field hands received two sets of clothing twice each year, with a hat and coat for winter. Meals often consisted of bread, molasses, sweet potatoes, hominy, and beef, chicken, and pork. Enslaved people often lived similarly to poor whites in Texas, especially those new to the territory and just getting started. The whites, however, could hope to improve their lives with their own hard work, while the enslaved people could have no such hope or expectation as their work belonged by law to their owners and not to them.

Many churches in Texas accepted enslaved people as members. Both the Baptist and Methodist churches appointed missionaries to the enslaved people and allowed active participation by them. In 1860, the Methodists claimed 7,541 enslaved people among their members in Texas. Some enslaved people became ministers, but their masters often tried to instruct them in what they were supposed to preach. As in other southern states, however, the enslaved people made Christianity their own and they developed strong religious faith.

Many local communities adopted laws forbidding enslaved people from having liquor or weapons, from selling agricultural products, hiring their own time, or being hired by free blacks. In rural areas, counties often set up patrols to enforce restrictions on enslaved people traveling without passes from planter owners. Urban enslaved people often had greater freedoms and opportunity. Unlike most southern states, Texas did not explicitly ban education of enslaved people, but most slaveholders did not allow the practice. In 1865, 95% of the enslaved were illiterate.

Many enslaved people ran away. Some hid in the bayous for a time, while others lived among the Indians, and a few managed to board ships bound for northern or foreign ports. Most runaways attempted to go to Mexico. By 1850, an estimated 3,000 enslaved people had successfully escaped to Mexico, and an additional 1,000 crossed into Mexico between 1851 and 1855. Ninety percent of the runaways were men, most between ages 20 and 40, because they were best equipped to deal with the long, difficult journey. All ages were represented, however, from 5 months to 60 years. As early as 1836, Texas slaveholders sent representatives to Matamoros to try to reclaim their runaways, but Mexico refused. See Underground Railroad § South to Mexico.

A group of enslaved people killed the sheriff of Gonzales when he attempted to stop their going to Matamoros. Over 30 of the fugitives made it safely to freedom in Mexico. From 1849 until 1860, Texas tried to convince the United States government to negotiate a treaty with Mexico to permit extradition of runaways, but it did not succeed. Some slave hunters illegally traveled to Mexico and captured runaways. After José María Jesús Carvajal promised to return all escapees, more than 400 Texans joined his revolt of 1851. He tried to create a Republic of Sierra Madre in Northern Mexico but was defeated by the Mexican Army.

White Texans were fearful about revolts, and as in other southern states, rumors of uprisings took hold rapidly, often in times of economic and social tension. In 1854, citizens in Austin and other towns drove many poor Mexicans from the area in fear that they might assist in revolts. Two years later, Colorado County hanged several enslaved people and drove one white man and several Mexicans from the area after uncovering a plot to equip 200 enslaved people with pistols and knives to escape into Mexico.

In 1860, mass hysteria ensued after a series of fires erupted throughout the state. Planters had hundreds of enslaved people arrested and questioned forcefully. Several confessed to a plot by white abolitionists to avenge John Brown's execution by burning food supplies and poisoning slaveowners. Up to 80 enslaved people and 37 whites may have been executed as a result of the supposed plot. Later newspaper accounts revealed that most of what was confessed under torture appeared to be false. Many of the fires had coincided with a summer drought, and new matches were susceptible to spontaneous combustion. The supposed "poison" found in enslaved quarters was baby powder. There was an auction block next to the Menger Hotel and near the Alamo. (Note: "The Texas Slave Insurrection of 1860," by William White, Southwestern Historical Quarterly, Vol. 52, No. 3, 1949, pps. 259–285; OCLC 5542888113, ISSN 0038-478X, JSTOR 30235055) (Note: Texas Terror: the Slave Insurrection Panic of 1860 and the Secession of the Lower South, by Donald Eugene Reynolds, PhD (born 1931), Louisiana State University Press (2007); OCLC 226066662, ISBN 978-0-8071-3283-8) (Note: (re: Insurrection Scare in East Texas) "Smith County and Its Neighgors During the Slave Insurrection Panic of 1860," by Donald Eugene Reynolds, PhD (born 1931), Chronicles of Smith County, Vol. 10, Fall 1971)

== Confederacy ==
Texas seceded from the United States in 1861 and joined the Confederate States of America on the eve of the American Civil War. It replaced the pro-Union governor, Sam Houston, in the process. During the war, slavery in Texas was little affected, and prices for enslaved people remained high until the last few months of the war. The number of enslaved people in the state increased dramatically as the Union Army occupied parts of Arkansas and Louisiana. Slaveholders in those areas often moved their enslaved to Texas to avoid having them freed. According to the US Census, there were 182,566 enslaved people in Texas in 1860. By the 1870 Census, as a result of births and inter-state migration after the Civil War, there were 253,475 free people of color and no slaves. Many planters, however, lost part of their workforce temporarily to the Confederate Army, which impressed one-quarter of the enslaved on each plantation to construct defensive earthworks for the Texas coast and to drive military supply wagons. Anyone convicted of providing arms to enslaved people during the war was sentenced to between two and five years of hard labor.

Unlike in other Southern states, only a small number of enslaved Texans, estimated at 47, joined the Union Army. Few battles took place in Texas, which acted as a supply state to the Confederacy. As Texas was much more distant from the Union Army lines for much of the war, enslaved people were unable to reach them. The last battle of the war was fought at Palmito Ranch near Brownsville, in 1865. It was fought between Confederates and a battalion from the all-black XXV Corps under General Sheridan. XXV Corps was a major component of the 50,000 strong Union Army force sent to pacify and reconstruct Texas.

== Emancipation ==
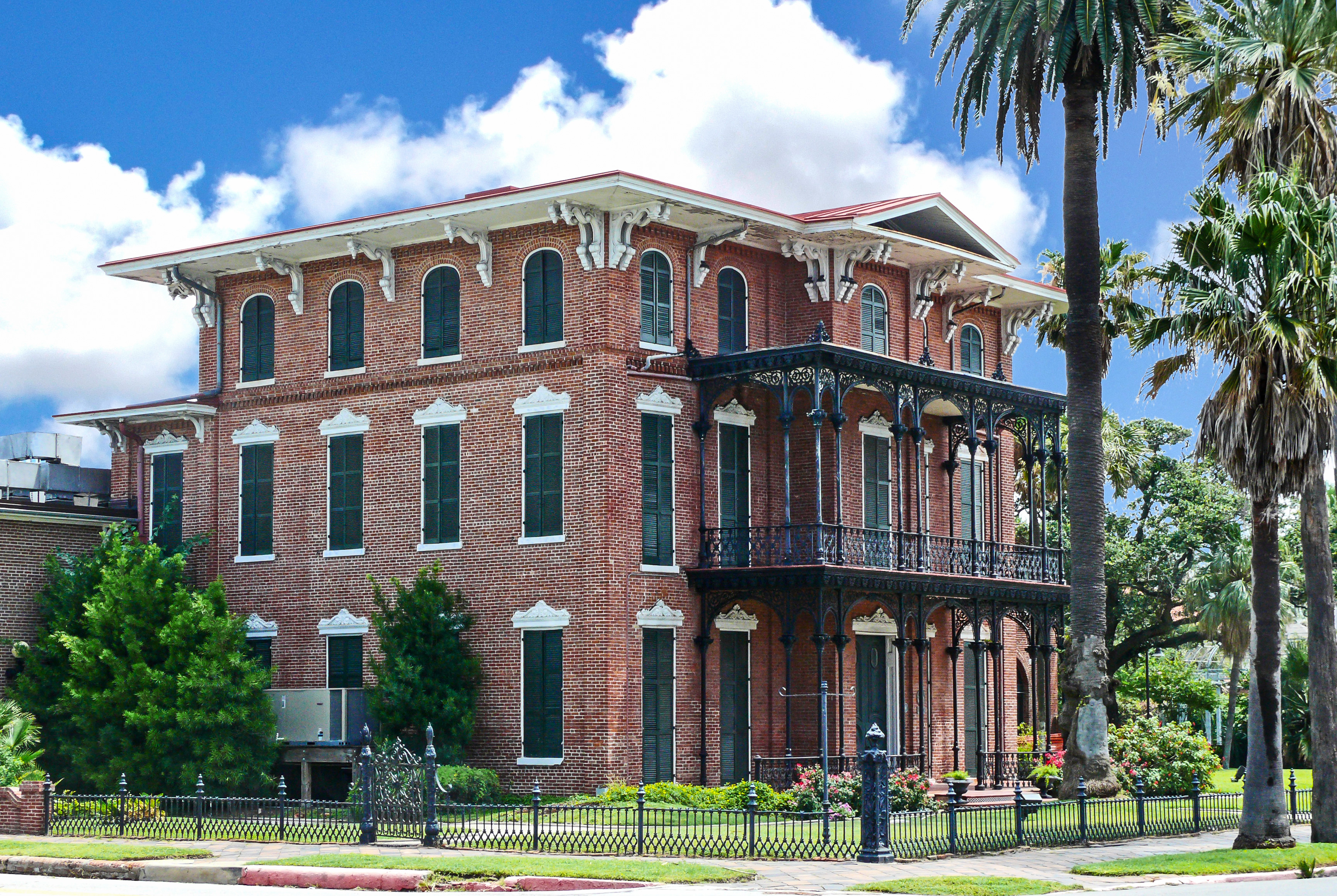
Ashton Villa

On June 19, 1865, Union General Gordon Granger and over 2,000 federal troops arrived at Galveston Island to take possession of the state and enforce the two-year-old Emancipation Proclamation. There, he proclaimed his "General Order No. 3" on the balcony of Ashton Villa:

The people of Texas are informed that, in accordance with a proclamation from the Executive of the United States, all slaves are free. This involves an absolute equality of personal rights and rights of property between former masters and slaves, and the connection heretofore existing between them becomes that between employer and hired labor. The freedmen are advised to remain quietly at their present homes and work for wages. They are informed that they will not be allowed to collect at military posts and that they will not be supported in idleness either there or elsewhere.

On some plantations, many enslaved people left immediately after hearing of the emancipation, even if their former owners offered to pay them wages. Throughout the summer, many East Texas newspapers continued to recommend that slaveholders oppose ratification of the Thirteenth Amendment, which abolished slavery, in the hopes that emancipation could be gradually implemented. Some slaveowners did not free their enslaved people until late in 1865.

Slavery was officially abolished by the Thirteenth Amendment which took effect on December 6, 1865. Slavery had been theoretically abolished by President Abraham Lincoln's Emancipation Proclamation which proclaimed, in 1863, that only those enslaved in territories that were in rebellion from the United States were free. Since the U.S. government was not in effective control of many of these territories until later in the war, many of these people proclaimed to be free by the Emancipation Proclamation were still held in servitude until those areas came back under Union control.

== Legacy ==
June 19, the day of the Emancipation announcement, has been celebrated annually in Texas and other states as Juneteenth.

The long-term effects of slavery can be seen to this day in the state's demographics. The eastern quarter of the state, where cotton production depended on thousands of slaves, is considered the westernmost extension of the Deep South. It contains a very significant number of Texas' African-American population. On the other hand, western parts of Texas were still a frontier during the American Civil War. While settled chiefly by Anglo-Southerners after the war; with the history of ranching, some of these parts have been more associated with the Southwest than the South.

In the 1870s, a system of legalized racial segregation and white supremacy was enforced. In 1876 Texas adopted a new constitution requiring segregated schools and imposing a poll tax, which decreased the number of poor voters both black and white. By the late 19th century, Texas passed other Jim Crow laws. The system of school support was inadequate, and schools for racial minorities were seriously underfunded. Texas did not, however, employ techniques common in other Southern states such as complex voter registration rules and literacy tests; even the "white primary" was not implemented statewide until 1923.

In 1900, African Americans comprised 20% of the state's population of 3,048,710. The drop in proportion of population reflected greatly-increased European immigration to the state in the 19th century, as well as population growth.

Like Georgia, the Texas Democratic Party adopted a whites-only primary. Since they politically dominated the state for decades after 1900, the only contest for office was at the primary level. The white primary was another way to exclude African Americans from making electoral decisions, and it was not overturned by the Supreme Court until 1944 in Smith v. Allwright. States that had used it adopted other means to keep most African Americans from voting.

African Americans immediately started raising legal challenges to disfranchisement, but early Supreme Court cases, such as Giles v. Harris (1903), upheld the states. Through organizations such as the National Association for the Advancement of Colored People (NAACP), African Americans continued to work to regain their ability to exercise their civil and voting rights as citizens. The civil rights movement led to the U.S. Congress and President Lyndon Johnson (Texas Democrat) passing the Civil Rights Act of 1964 and the Voting Rights Act of 1965, which protected the rights of all citizens to integrated public facilities and enforcement of voting rights.

On June 25, 2013, the U.S. Supreme Court struck down Section 4(b) of the Voting Rights Act as unconstitutional, a ruling which was shortly followed the implementation of voter ID laws in Texas. Those against this decision typically argue that it unfairly targets key Democratic constituencies such as minority groups and the elderly, while proponents argue that the law's intention is to prevent voting by illegal immigrants.

== See also ==
- Bibliography of the Texas Revolution, Republic, and Annexation
- History of African Americans in Austin
- History of African Americans in Houston
- History of African Americans in Dallas–Fort Worth
- History of African Americans in San Antonio
- Estevanico
- Juneteenth
- Joshua Houston, former slave of Sam and Margaret Houston
- Jane Elkins, enslaved Texas woman who was convicted of murder
- Texas Confederate Museum
- History of slavery in the United States by state

== Footnotes and references ==
=== References for footnotes ===
- Almaráz, Félix D. Jr. (1971), Tragic Cavalier: Governor Manuel Salcedo of Texas, 1808–1813 (2nd ed.), College Station, TX: Texas A&M University Press, ISBN 0-89096-503-X
- Barr, Alwyn (1996), Black Texans: A history of African Americans in Texas, 1528–1995 (2nd ed.), Norman, OK: University of Oklahoma Press, ISBN 0-8061-2878-X
- Campbell, Randolph B., An Empire for Slavery: The Peculiar Institution in Texas, 1821-1865, Baton Rouge: Louisiana State University Press, 1989
- Chipman, Donald E. (1992), Spanish Texas, 1519-1821, Austin, TX: University of Texas Press, ISBN 0-292-77659-4
- de la Teja, Jesus F. (1996), San Antonio de Bexar: A Community on New Spain's Northern Frontier, Albuquerque, NM: University of New Mexico Press, ISBN 978-0-8263-1751-3
- Edmondson, J.R. (2000), The Alamo Story-From History to Current Conflicts, Plano, TX: Republic of Texas Press, ISBN 1-55622-678-0
- Hopewell, Clifford (1994), James Bowie Texas Fighting Man: A Biography, Austin, TX: Eakin Press, ISBN 0-89015-881-9
- Vazquez, Josefina Zoraida (1997), "The Colonization and Loss of Texas: A Mexican Perspective", in Rodriguez O., Jaime E.; Vincent, Kathryn (eds.), Myths, Misdeeds, and Misunderstandings: The Roots of Conflict in U.S.–Mexican Relations, Wilmington, DE: Scholarly Resources Inc., ISBN 0-8420-2662-2
- Williams, David A. (1997), Bricks Without Straw: A Comprehensive History of African Americans in Texas, Austin, TX: Eakin Press, ISBN 1-57168-041-1
- Salas. Mario Marcel, "Foundation Myth in Political Thought: The Racial Moorings of Foundation Myth", Dubugue:Kendal Hunt Publishers,2011
