= Texian Militia =

1823–1835 militia of American colonists in Mexican Texas

- Active: 5 Aug 1823 – 2 Oct 1835
- Allegiance: First Mexican Empire, 1823; Provisional Government, 1823–1824; First Mexican Republic, 1824–1835; Texian Government, 1835
- Type: Militia
- Role: Desert warfare Force protection Guerrilla warfare Raiding; Reconnaissance; Screening; Skirmishers; Tracking
- Size: ~300 at peak
- Part of: Mexican Army, 1823–1835; Texas Military Forces, 1835
- Engagements: Guerilla Conflicts: Skull Creek Massacre; Battle of Jones Creek; Dressing Point massacre; Insurrection: Fredonian Rebellion; Texas Revolution: Battle of Anahuac; Battle of Velasco; Battle of Nacogdoches; San Felipe Incident; Battle of Gonzales; Battle of the Alamo

Commanders
- Notable commanders: Stephen F. Austin; Frank W. Johnson; John Austin; James Bowie; William B. Travis; John H. Moore; Moses Morrison; John J. Tumlinson; Robert H. Kuykendall

The Texian Militia was the militia forces of Texian colonists in the Mexican state of Coahuila y Tejas from 1823 to 1835 and the inaugurate force of the Texas Military. It was established by Stephen F. Austin on August 5, 1823 for defense of the Old Three Hundred colonists against the Karankawa, Comanche, and Cherokee tribes; among others. Its most notable unit, the Texas Rangers, remained in continuous service of Texas Military Forces until 1935.

The Texian Militia sparked the Texas Revolution at the Battle of Velasco and became legendary at the Battle of Gonzales (the "Lexington of Texas") which marked its transition to the Texian Army and Texian Navy. Their legend continued at the Battle of the Alamo as the only relief force to answer the To the People of Texas & All Americans in the World letter. The Texian Militia comprised 22% of the Texian Army service members who fought until the Battle of San Jacinto, helping the Texian Government win independence from the Centralist Republic of Mexico on May 14, 1836 at the Treaties of Velasco.

== Authority ==
The Texian Militia was first authorized on February 18, 1823 by Agustín de Iturbide of the First Mexican Empire who ordered the Empresario Stephen F. Austin to "organize the colonists into a body of militia to preserve tranquility." On August 5, 1823 Austin officially established the Texian Militia:

"Since the commencement of this Colony no labor or expense has been spared on my part towards its organization, benefit and security—And I shall always be ready and willing to risk my health, my property or my life for the common advantage of those who have embarked with me in this enterprise. As proof of the reality of this declaration I have determined to augment at my own private expense the company of men which was raised by order of the late Governor José Félix Trespalacios for the defense of the Colony against hostile Indians. I therefore by these presents give public notice that I will employ ten men in addition to those employed by the Government to act as rangers for the common defense. The said ten men will form a part of Lieut. Moses Morrison’s Company and the whole will be subject to my orders. The wages I will give the said ten men is fifteen Dollars a month payable in property, they finding [it] themselves. Those who wish to be employed will apply without delay. Stephen F. Austin 5 August 1823."

Stephen F. Austin

5 August 1823

In 1823, the First Mexican Empire transitioned to the Provisional Government of Mexico which established the First Mexican Republic in 1824. In 1828, the Coahuila y Tejas Legislature order colonists to "form a militia to defend themselves".

== Units ==
- Bexar
- Goliad
- Rangers
  - Gonzales Ranging Company
- San Felipe

== Notable engagements ==
Date	Combatant(s)	Conflict	Type	Unit	Commander	Casualties	Outcome	Reference
1823	Coco (Karankawa)	Skull Creek Massacre	Guerilla	Mina (Colorado)	Robert H. Kuykendall	0	Victory/atrocity	
1824	Coco (Karankawa)	Battle of Jones Creek	Guerilla		Randal Jones	Unknown	Inconclusive	
1826	Coco (Karankawa)	Dressing Point massacre	Guerilla		Aylett C. Buckner	0	Victory/atrocity	
1826	Haden Edwards, Benjamin Edwards Martin Parmer	Fredonian Rebellion	Insurrection		Mateo Ahumada, Juan Antonio SaucedoStephen Austin	0	Victory	
1832	Juan Bradburn	Battle of Anahuac	Insurrection		Frank W. Johnson	1 KIA	Victory	
1832	Domingo Ugartechea	Battle of Velasco	Insurrection		John Austin		Victory	
1832	José de las Piedras Francisco Medina	Battle of Nacogdoches	Insurrection		James Bowie James W. Bullock	4 KIA, 3 WIA	Victory	
1835	Antonio Tenorio	Anahuac 1835	Insurrection		William B. Travis	0	Victory	
1835	Francisco de Castañeda	Battle of Gozales	Revolution		John H. Moore	0	Victory	
1836	Santa Anna	Siege of the Alamo	Relief force	Immortal 32	George C. Kimble	32 KIA	Loss	

== Legacy ==
"The Settlement of Austin's Colony" by Henry Arthur McArdle, 1879. Commanding Officer Stephen F. Austin portrayed establishing the Texian Militia in 1824 for defense against the Karankawa tribe.

Since 1823, the Texian Militia has undergone many re-designations and reorganizations in the Texas Military Forces:

- Texian Militia, 1823–1835 (Colonist era), 1835–1836 (Texas Revolution)
- Texas Militia, 1836–1845 (Republic era), 1845–1861 (Frontier era)
- Texas Home Guard/State Troops, 1861–65 (American Civil War)
- Texas Volunteer Guard, 1871–1904 (Reconstruction era)

Following the Militia Act of 1903, the Texas Militia was divided into separate forces:

1. The Texas Army National Guard and Texas Air National Guard, subject to Title 32 and Title 10 of the United States Code which legally empowers the United States government to mobilize it when more resources are needed than available in the United States Armed Forces for war, national emergency, or national security.
2. The Texas State Guard, only subject to Title 32 of the United States Code which legally empowers individual states to maintain military forces.

Since 1903, the Texas National Guard designation has remained the same while the Texas State Guard has been designated as the:

- Texas Reserve Militia, 1905–1913
- Texas Home Guard, 1914–1918 (World War I)
- Texas Reserve Militia, 1919–1940
- Texas Defense/State Guard, 1941–45 (World War II)
- Texas State Guard Reserve Corps, 1945–1965
- Texas State Guard, 1965–present

== See also ==
- Immortal 32
- Texas Military Forces
- Texas Military Department
- List of conflicts involving the Texas Military
- Awards and decorations of the Texas Military
