= Anahuac disturbances =

Uprisings of settlers in Texas in 1832 and 1835

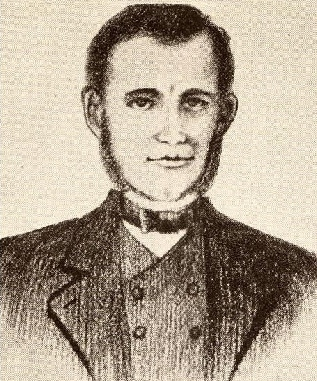
William B. Travis played a key role in the Anahuac Disturbances of 1832.

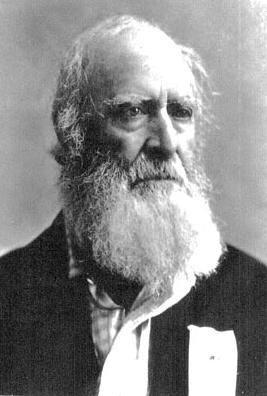
Frank W. Johnson commanded Texan forces during the 1832 Battle of Anahuac.

The Anahuac disturbances were uprisings of settlers in and around Anahuac, Texas, in 1832 and 1835 which helped to precipitate the Texas Revolution. This eventually led to the territory's secession from Mexico and the founding of the Republic of Texas. Anahuac was located on the east side of the Trinity River near the north shore of Galveston Bay, which placed it astride the trade route between Texas and Louisiana and from there to the rest of the United States. In new attempts to curtail smuggling and enforce customs tariffs from the coastal settlements, Mexico placed a garrison there after 1830. American settlers came into conflict with Mexican military officers, rose up against them, and increased political activity and residents of numerous communities declared support for the federalists, who were revolting against the Mexican Government.

== Background ==
After Mexico gained independence from Spain, it legalized immigration from the United States. Empresarios were granted contracts to settle immigrants from the United States and Europe in Mexican Texas. As the number of Americans living in Texas increased, Mexican authorities began to fear the United States would want to annex Texas. On April 6, 1830, the Mexican government passed a series of laws restricting immigration from the United States into Texas. The laws also canceled all unfilled empresario contracts and established customs houses in Texas to enforce the collection of customs duties. Mexican military officer Juan Davis Bradburn, formerly an American citizen, was appointed commander of a new customs and garrison post on Galveston Bay. In October 1830, Bradburn established a post atop a 30 feet (9.1 m) bluff at the entrance to the Trinity River. The post became known as Anahuac.

Bradburn was unpopular from the beginning of his tenure with those seeking to expand Anglo-American settlement in Texas. He opposed the efforts of the state land commissioner to grant titles to settlers who lived near Anahuac. The Mexican Constitution of 1824 prohibited immigrants from settling within 26 miles (42 km) of the coast, and most of these settlers lived too close to the coast. Although the commissioner was finally able to grant the titles, Texian settlers were angry with Bradburn for enforcing Mexican law.

In January 1832, Bradburn received a letter listing 10 men in his jurisdiction who wanted to separate Texas from Mexico. From that point onward, Bradburn became increasingly obsessed about the Texians and their intentions, believing that every event was part of a conspiracy to detach Texas.' In June 1832, two of Bradburn's soldiers attacked a Texian woman. Angry settlers tarred and feathered a neighbor who had failed to aid her. They demanded for Bradburn to turn over the soldiers for a similar punishment. After Bradburn refused, local men organized a Texian Militia company, supposedly to protect the settlement from the Indians. Mexican law forbade residents from creating militias and so Bradburn arrested the ringleader, Patrick Jack. After Bradburn received death threats, he released Jack.

== 1832 Disturbance ==
=== Prelude ===
Tensions between Bradburn and the colonists escalated. Bradburn strongly supported the Mexican law forbidding slavery. In August 1831 he gave asylum to three men who had escaped slavery in Louisiana. The owner retained local lawyer William Barret Travis to represent him in trying to get the slaves returned. In May 1832, Bradburn received a letter, ostensibly from a friend, warning that 100 armed men would come from Louisiana to reclaim the slaves. When Bradburn realized that the letter was a hoax, he arrested William B. Travis for questioning. He intended to send Travis to Matamoros for a military trial on charges of attempted insurrection to separate the territory from Mexico. Conviction on this charge would lead to Travis's execution. Unfamiliar with Mexican law, the settlers were outraged that Bradburn could arrest the man without a warrant, a statement of charges, or trial by jury. Most erroneously assumed they were still covered by the United States Bill of Rights.

Jack threatened Bradburn, who arrested him again. Travis and Jack then began plotting their escape. They attempted to smuggle letters to David G. Burnet, a fellow instigator; the letters called on Texians to aid them but stopped short of calling for armed rebellion. Bradburn intercepted the letters before delivery.

Although settlers at first did not get involved, they became alarmed at learning that Bradburn was taking statements from potential witnesses without allowing Travis, Jack, or their legal representation to speak with the witnesses. Jack's brother organized a contingent of men to march from Brazoria to Anahuac. Texians began arriving from other villages as well. One of the Brazoria councilmen, John Austin, stopped to consult Colonel Domingo Ugartechea, who commanded the garrison on the Brazos. Ugartechea recommended that Austin request that the men be remanded into civilian custody.

Bradburn's officers explained to Austin and company that the laws prohibited turning the accused men over to civilian authorities. The Brazoria men returned home. After they left, the Mexican officers discovered that their horses had been stolen. They arrested two local men on suspicion of the theft. On hearing of the new arrests, the Brazoria contingent returned to Anahuac. They camped with other angry civilians several miles from Anahuac and elected Frank W. Johnson as commander. The group soon captured Bradburn's nineteen cavalry officers, who had been trying to reconnoiter the Texian position.

On June 10, the insurgents occupied buildings in northern Anahuac. Bradburn worried that the armed men wanted to do more than free the American prisoners; he suspected a full-scale revolt. Bradburn had Travis and Jack tied to the ground and held at gunpoint. Bradburn threatened to shoot both men if the Texians attacked. Travis encouraged Johnson to lead an attack anyway. During the ensuing negotiations, the Texians offered to exchange the cavalry officers for Travis and the other prisoners. Mexican officers agreed to release their prisoners into civilian custody in exchange for the cavalry officers and for the withdrawal of the Texians to Turtle Bayou. Although most of the rebels left Anahuac, between 15 and 30 of them remained scattered through the town. Bradburn believed this violated their agreement and warned that he would begin firing on the village within two hours. Most of the Texians believed that Bradburn had lied to them just to get them out of the buildings they had occupied. Unbeknownst to the Texians at the time, the buildings contained extra ammunition and supplies.

=== Battle of Anahuac ===
After hearing Bradburn's warning, the women and children of Anahuac fled the town. Mexican soldiers briefly engaged the men who remained; five Mexican soldiers and one Texian died in the conflict. After the skirmish, the remaining Texians gathered at Turtle Bayou to await the arrival of cannons coming from Brazoria.

On June 5, the Texians adopted the Turtle Bayou Resolutions. In this document, they announced they were federalists who supported rebellious Mexican general Antonio Lopez de Santa Anna. They decried "the present dynasty" that kept them under military rather than civil authority. While the Texians waited for their artillery, Bradburn appealed for reinforcements from Colonel Piedras, stationed at Nacogdoches 200 miles (320 km) north, and Colonel Elosúa at San Antonio, about 300 miles (480 km) to the west. On June 19, Piedras and about 100 of his men set out to support Bradburn.

John Austin and his men returned to Brazoria for the cannons. On June 20, he called the residents together, and they voted to oppose the centralist government. Austin invited Colonel Domingo Ugartechea, who commanded the small Fort Velasco on the Brazos, to join their cause. After Ugartechea refused, on June 26 the Brazoria residents attacked the fort. The action became known as the Battle of Velasco. The next morning, Ugartechea surrendered under an agreement that he and his men would return to Matamoros but leave their artillery behind.

When Piedras was within 30 miles (48 km) of Anahuac, he sent a delegation to Johnson, who provided him with a list of grievances against Bradburn. Piedras negotiated a resolution of the conflict. Among the measures to which he agreed were:

- to reestablish the ayuntamiento at Liberty;
- to release the civilian prisoners at Anahuac to civilian authorities
- to have Bradburn resign in favor of an officer of his choice.

With Texians' acceptance of the terms on June 28, Piedras marched to Anahuac on July 1.

=== Aftermath ===
Bradburn's chosen successor, Lieutenant Colonel Felix Maria Subarán, refused to take his place. Piedras took temporary command of the garrison. On July 2, he released the prisoners to the civilian authorities; within a week they were released with no charges filed. On July 8, Piedras left for Nacogdoches. He gave command of the Anahuac garrison to Lieutenant Cortina, previously the third-in-command.

Three days after Piedras left, the bulk of the Anahuac troops declared themselves federalists. The troops were drunk and Cortina, unable to maintain order, asked Bradburn to resume command. Bradburn refused, instead recommending that Subarán take responsibility.

After an attempt at his assassination was forestalled, Bradburn decided to leave Texas. None of the local ship captains would give him passage. On July 13, Subarán announced he would not guarantee the safety of any officers who supported the centralist government. That night, Bradburn left Anahuac; a hired guide took him on foot to Louisiana. Other officers sought sanctuary with sympathetic locals.

Historians have discussed Bradburn's role. William C. Davis believes that he "overreacted and made heroes of two local malcontents whose actions their own people otherwise had not been much inclined to sanction". The resulting Turtle Bayou Resolutions, however, encouraged other Texians to follow similar courses. Many communities declared support for Santa Anna. When Piedras returned to Nacogdoches, he discovered citizens were forming Texian Militia companies. He asked the local ayuntamiento to order the militias to disband; they refused and instead formed their own militia. On August 1, the combined militias ordered Piedras to vow support for the federalist revolt. When he refused, the Texians attacked and the Battle of Nacogdoches commenced. Several days later, they took Piedras and his men prisoner and "convinced" them to become federalists. With the soldiers' surrender and retreat into the Mexican interior, no Mexican troops remained in eastern Texas. This encouraged the colonists to increase political activity. Soon after, they organized the Convention of 1832, marking the first attempt to gather Texians from each of the colonies to discuss common goals.

== 1835 disturbance ==
A second dispute arose in late June 27, 1835, again over the issue of customs. Leading up to this crisis, a large number of Texian settlers had invaded the Anahuac area. The current commander was reported as being uneasy about the insubordinate attitudes of the locals, and he requested additional military assistance from his superiors. Tensions continued to escalate as some citizens demonstrated with anti-taxation protests and petitions. In addition, a group is known as the Citizens of Texas began to meet with the intention of realizing these demands. Andrew Briscoe, a local merchant and boat captain as well as a member of this group, complained that taxes were not being enforced equally at all ports. He intentionally tested the new commander, Capt. Antonio Tenorio, by loading his boat in a way to increase the curiosity of the officials. Briscoe simply loaded his boat with ballast. Tenorio was incensed and arrested Briscoe and his partner DeWitt Clinton Harris. The soldiers escorting Harris and Briscoe shot and wounded another Texian, young William Smith.

Travis played a major role afterward. When news of the arrests was heard in San Felipe de Austin, where radical sentiments were taking hold, the political chief Peter Miller authorized Travis to gather a Texian Militia company for a response. Travis commandeered a vessel at Harrisburg, and sailed for Anahuac with the company and a cannon. His 25-man force quickly gained surrender of the more than 40 Mexican troops. After disarming them, Travis and the company freed the Texians and expelled the troops.

Because Travis had acted without broad community support, he apologized to avoid endangering Stephen F. Austin, then in Mexico City. Austin was the most prominent empresario under contract by the Spanish, and later Mexican, governments to oversee the immigration of people to Mexico's frontier. Later that summer, Mexican military authorities demanded the surrender of Travis for military trial. The colonists opposed this.

Travis and Austin continued active in Texas development. Travis died at the Battle of the Alamo. Austin served as secretary of state for the Republic of Texas for a short time before his own death.

== See also ==
- Texian Militia
- List of conflicts involving the Texas Military
- Terán Expedition to Texas
