= Skull Creek massacre =

1823 massacre of Karankawa people in Mexican Texas

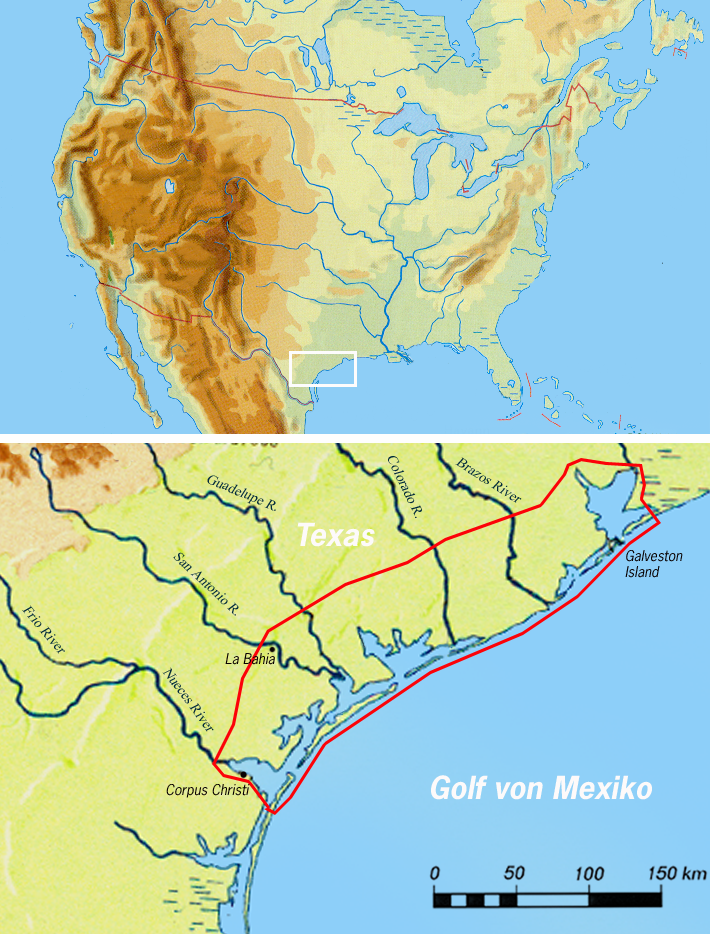
Map of the Karankawa people

The Skull Creek massacre was the murder of at least 19 Karankawa people in Mexican Texas by Texian Militia in February 1823. Before 1823, there were few settlers of European heritage from the United States in the state of Texas. With the formation of the First Mexican Republic in 1823 and the opening of Mexican Texas to colonists from the United States, people began to settle in the state. The subsequent competition for land-based resources, combined with Native American raids on the new settlers' cattle, led to deep hostility and conflict between the two groups.

== History ==
=== Background ===
In the Galveston Bay area, colonists were still a minority in the 1820s. The newest settlers came from well-settled regions of the American South and were not accustomed to living among large Indian populations in a non-dominant relationship. In 1823, after back-and-forth negotiation with the newly independent Mexican government, Stephen F. Austin began to claim rich tracts of land near bays and river mouths populated by the Karankawa. The Karankawa relied on these bays for the fish and shellfish that provided their winter protein sources and thus were fiercely protective of that land. Austin wrote upon scouting the land that extermination of the Karankawa would be necessary, despite the fact that his first encounter with the tribe was friendly.

=== Incident ===
In February 1823, Coco Indians killed two colonists. The colonists, led by Robert Kuykendall, gathered twenty-six Texian Militia who found a Karankawa village on Skull Creek. They killed at least 19 inhabitants of the village, then stole the villagers' possessions and burned their homes to the ground. Multiple participants in the slaughter cited the cannibalism and "warlike" or "repugnant" nature of the Karankawa as a justification for the massacre.

=== Aftermath ===
The colonists soon began working on an alliance with the Tonkawa Indians of the region, whom they saw as "great beggars" who did not threaten their desires to settle on the land. There were further battles and one-sided massacres, and by 1824 the local Carancaguase chief Antonio signed a treaty abandoning their homelands east of the Guadalupe River. Soon this treaty was violated on both sides, leading to Austin’s 1825 orders to pursue and kill all Karankawa on sight, the Dressing Point Massacre, and the eventual permanent loss of the land by the local Indians by 1827. Having difficulty in finding uninhabited regions in which a living could be had, the remaining bands of Karankawa scattered out, became day laborers in cities and on plantations, were taken as slaves by Austin's settlers, or were killed in later conflicts. By 1860, free Karankawa had been eliminated.

== See also ==
- Texian Militia
- List of conflicts involving the Texas Military
- List of Indian massacres
- Terrorism in the United States
