= Battle of Nacogdoches =

1832 battle of the Mexican Federalist War

- Part of Mexican Federalist War
Date	August 2 – August 3, 1832
Location	Nacogdoches, Texas, Coahuila y Tejas
Result	Texian victory, Mexican army expelled from East Texas

Belligerents
Mexico	Texian Militia

Commanders and leaders
(Mexico) Col. José de las Piedras (surrendered) (Mexico) Capt. Francisco Medina	James W. Bullock; James Bowie

Strength
387	350

Casualties and losses
47 killed, 40 wounded & 300 captured	4 killed, 3 wounded

The Battle of Nacogdoches culminated on August 2, 1832, after a group of Texians resisted an order issued in July by the commander of the Mexican Army at Nacogdoches, Texas to surrender their arms. The situation soon escalated into a major battle.

== Background ==
Numerous communities advocated support for the Mexican federalists, who were revolting against the central government. The Texians thought they had found their champion when Antonio López de Santa Anna declared against the Centralist regime in 1832.

The Mexican army commander in Nacogdoches, José de las Piedras, after reviewing all that occurred during the Anahuac Disturbances, had issued an order that all residents in his area surrender their arms. James Bowie heard of the situation and cut short a visit to Natchez in July 1832 to return to Texas. The city officials of Nacogdoches resisted the order and soon organized a militia.

== Call to arms ==
On July 28, they issued a call for help from the local settlements. Messengers were sent out requesting military assistance. Samuel S. Davis and Bailey Anderson, Jr. brought men to Nacogdoches from the area surrounding the Ayish Bayou, John M. Bradley brought men from the San Augustine area, and James Bradshaw brought a company from the Neches settlement. Parties from the Sabine and Shelby settlements also sent assistance. On August 1, a force of about 300 met up at Pine Hill and elected James W. Bullock of Attoyac Bayou as their captain.

== Conflict ==
On the morning of August 2, 1832, Bowie joined the Texian Militia and they marched into Nacogdoches to voice their demands to Piedras and to declare favor for Santa Anna. Piedras declined to rescind his order and to support Santa Anna.

The group returned in the evening and before they had reached the building housing the city officials, they were attacked by a force of 100 Mexican cavalry. The Texians returned fire, but some eventually fell back. Fighting continued and the cavalry retreated. 100 Texians initiated a siege of the garrison. As house-to-house fighting progressed, the Texians took possession of several buildings and the Old Stone Fort. With Mexican casualties escalating, the Mexican Army took refuge in the main fort. A second battle line began to form from the north, that drove the cavalry from the Mexican headquarters known as Old Red House, while Redlanders arriving from San Augustine approached from the rear. During the night, the Mexican army evacuated from the city.

On August 3, James Carter, Bowie, and 15 companions ambushed the fleeing army on the Angelina River and Piedras fled to a nearby home. His men turned against him and Captain Francisco Medina took charge. Medina declared to be federalist and surrendered Piedras and 300 troops to the Texians. Piedras had lost some forty-seven men killed, with forty plus wounded. The Texians marched the rest of the soldiers back to Nacogdoches and on to San Antonio, where they were released. Asa Edwards escorted Piedras to Stephen F. Austin at San Felipe. Piedras was paroled and sent to the Mexican interior. The Texians suffered three killed and four wounded, one mortally.

== See also ==
- Texian Militia
- List of conflicts involving the Texas Military
