= John Austin (soldier) =

Soldier and settler (1801–1833)

John Austin (March 17, 1801 – August 11, 1833) was a Texian settler, one of Stephen Austin's Old Three Hundred, and the Texian commander at the Battle of Velasco during the Anahuac Disturbances before Texas Revolution.

No relation (or a distant relation) to the empresario Stephen Austin, John was born to John Punderson Austin and Susan Rogers Austin in New Haven, Connecticut. He initially also bore the middle name Punderson but apparently ceased using it, as it appears on none of his Texan records. John found work as a sailor and joined the Long expedition in New Orleans in 1819. Captured and imprisoned in Mexico, John later returned to Texas and joined Stephen Austin's colony, befriending him and becoming constable of his settlement at San Felipe de Austin. He was joined in Texas by his brother William.

Stephen provided the capital for John's cotton gin on Buffalo Bayou, and his brother James opened a store with John in Brazoria, Texas. Involved through his business with the coasting trade, John became the port officer in 1831 and alcalde for Brazoria the next year. He was also the delegate for Victoria at the Convention of 1832, signed the Turtle Bayou Resolutions, and following his command at Velasco was elected brigadier general of the Texian militia.

John Austin died with his two children in a cholera epidemic at Gulf Prairie. His wife Elizabeth married Thomas Parrott in 1834, returning the upper half of John's Buffalo Bayou grant to his father. His father, arriving in Texas, also succumbed to cholera and died in 1834. Half of the lower John Austin league was later sold to John and Augustus Allen for the settlement which became Houston, Texas.

== See also ==
- List of Convention of 1832 delegates

== Sources ==
- Site of his home in Brazoria, Texas
