= Dressing Point massacre =

1826 murders of Karankawa people in Mexican Texas

Coordinates: 28.691°N 95.968°W

The Dressing Point massacre was the murder in 1826 of 40–50 Karankawa people in Mexican Texas near present-day Matagorda at the mouth of the Colorado River by Texan farmers, in response to the constant murders and depredations against Stephen F. Austin's Anglo colonists who settled along the Colorado River in Texas.

== History ==
=== Background ===
Due to the Spanish empressario contracts, colonists from Mexico and North America were granted property provided they settle their families and improve the lands. Between December 1821 and 1826, 300 heads of families made their way up the Colorado River, settling between 60 and 80 miles upriver from the native lands of the Karankawa people. Like the neighboring Tonkawa, Tawakani and Waco, the Karankawa visited the settlers. A man named Baily quickly set up a trading post among them. However, all of the tribes began to steal from the settlers causing tension. Austin's colonists were welcomed by the Tonkawa natives who ranged between the Colorado River and Brazos conducting peaceful trades. Under the Tonkawa chief, Plácido, a strong bond between the two peoples emerged.

On October 15, 1819, a French sloop freighted with Mexican supplies, wines, etc. and bound for Cassano became stranded on Galveston Island, at the opposite end of Bolivar Point on the east end of the island. A party of 200 Karankawa were encamped in the immediate vicinity and seeing the opportunity to plunder attacked all at once. All the castaways were butchered and the sloop plundered.

In 1820 the Karankawa were described as, "a poor and miserable race, emphatically cannibals, with a population from 650-750, 150 of which are warriors, occupying the mouths of the Brazos and the beautiful bayou Los Buros and the intervening country. They are almost amphibious and derive from numerous little water courses which intersect the lowlands they inhabit living in deer skinned huts and almost impenetrable fastness. They are friendly with the Spaniards from whom they obtain some scanty but necessary supplies, and hostile to all other human beings. They are cowardly treacherous and cruel, and invariably eat their prisoners. The men are large and of light complexion and subsist mostly on alligators."

In September 1821, after meeting with and being warned by the Mexicans about the Karankawa, Stephen F. Austin wrote:

"These Indians and the Karankawa may be called universal enemies to man. They killed of all nations that came into their power, and frequently feast on the bodies of their victims. The approach of an American population will be the signal of their extermination for there will be no way of subduing them but extermination.

On February 23rd, Karankawa ambushed three of Austin's colonists paddling a lone pirogue full of corn on the Colorado River. They were fifteen miles below Austin’s settlement at the mouth of Skull Creek at the Colorado River. Mr. Loy and Mr. Ally were killed instantly by a flurry of arrows, the third occupant, John C. Clark, was shot in the back with an arrow and reported the attack.

This same evening, Robert Brotherton was riding along the from the settlement to Skull Creek. He saw the Indians but thinking they were friendly Tonkawa and not the Karankawa so far up river, he approached them and dismounted his horse. An Indian stepped up to him and took his loaded rifle from the saddle and attempted if it was loaded. The Indians were acting strange and Brotherton realized it was the Karankawa and attempted to get it back from the Indian. It was pulled away and the Indian pointed it at Brotherton and pulled the trigger. The gun did not go off as it was a “double trigger” and the Indian could not figure it out. Brotherton ran and the Indian dropped the rifle and fired an arrow into Brotherton's back as he ran into the trees. He escaped and made it back to the settlement in a few hours.

The farmers retaliated, electing a captain named Abner Kirkendall, returned to Skull Creek and killed 19 men. The Karakawa retaliated on June 10, when a large party went above the head of Bay Prairie, cross over the river and killed some of the settler's stock and wounded two men named John C. Clark and Alexander Jackson at the head of Bay Prairie. The Karankawa then captured three men, and American named White who was traveling with two Mexicans in a canoe toward San Antonio. They let White free under the promise that White would bring down corn from the settlement and divide it with Karankawa.

"The fight [with the Karankawa] was an entire surprise." Wrote John H. Moore. "We all felt it was an act of justice and self-preservation. We were too weak to furnish food for [them] and had to be let alone to get bread for ourselves. Ungainly and repugnant, their cannibalism being beyond question, they were obnoxious to whites, whose patience resisted with difficulty their frequent attacks upon the scanty population of the colonies, and when it passed endurance they went to their chastisement with alacrity."

Soon, the Tawakani and Keechi began stealing from the settlers as well. The colonists, consisting of a dozen families, were living -if such existence could be called living – huddled together for security against the Karankawa, who, though not openly hostile, were not friendly. The rude log cabins, windowless and floorless...gave only partial protection against the rain and sun and they were absolutely devoid of comfort. Barely eking out a living, the settlers held their possession dear and when precious items, such as their horses were stolen or work oxen killed, the reaction could lead to murderous revenge. Fortunately, as Smithwick informed us, game was plenty the year around so there was no need of starving.

"To prevent, hereafter, such outrages, and to recover the stolen horses,” Austin wrote to the governor, "I resolved to march against them, which I did. I surprised their camp on the 2nd of October 1823 and compelled the captain to deliver to me all the stolen animals, and to inflict, with his own hands, in my presence, a severe lashing to the marauders. I ordered them also to leave this river and the Colorado at once, with a warning that if they attempted agains to steal cattle, or molest the settlers on these river, I would not be satisfied with lashes oly, but would cause the delinquents to be shot, and extrmity to which I do not wish to be compelled to resort."

But peace between the colonists and the Karankawa Indians along the Colorado River was never attained as thefts continued. In 1825, a settler at the mouth of San Bernardo Creek was killed, Austin wrote to Mexican official, Mateo Ahumada:

"In consequence of the continuous hostilities of the [Karankawa], and considering the treaty of peace we made with them…was broken by them without any cause whatever…I have been compelled to view of the security of our people to give positive orders to the Lieutenant of the militia…to pursue and kill all those Indians wherever they are found."

=== Incident ===
In 1826, near the lower Colorado River, the home of Charles Cavanaugh and neighbor, Elisha Flowers had been attacked by an estimated seventy Karankawa men near Live Oak Bayou on Old Caney Creek in Austin's Colony. Four white women in the house were murdered, as was Mrs. Flowers. Two badly wounded girls survived the assault.

=== Consequences ===
Cavanaugh sounded the alarms and sixty of Austin's settlers under command of Captain Aylett C. Buckner set out to the cabin. From there they followed the trail to an encampment about three miles east of the present town of Matagorda where they surprised enemy at daybreak, completely routing them, killing about thirty.

The Karankaw moved west and the following year, they attacked a Mexican Ranch near present-day Sarita, killing ten, nine of them women, while taking three girls captive.

Homicide, war and disease had taken their toll on the Karankawa. In 1828, a French naturalist, Jean-Louis Berlandier, visited Texas by way of Coahuila where he observed, “an uninhabited country except for crosses of the dead that lined the roads, victims of generations of Native American assaults on travelers." Upon reaching the Rio Grande, he noted that there were but 100 families of the Karankawa remaining. According to one chronicler, “In 1836 the Mexicans began to kill the remnants of the tribe for robberies and murders, and then, notwithstanding the treaty boundary of the Lavaca River, the Karankawa sought protection with the colonists and were distributed among the white families."

== See also ==
- Texian Militia
- List of conflicts involving the Texas Military
- Karankawa people
- Stephen F. Austin
- List of Indian massacres
- Terrorism in the United States
