= San Antonio de Béxar: A Community on New Spain's Northern Frontier =

1995 non-fiction book by Jesus F. de la Teja

San Antonio de Béxar: A Community on New Spain's Northern Frontier is a non-fiction book by Jesus F. de la Teja, published by the University of New Mexico Press in 1995.

The book chronicles the history of what is now San Antonio, Texas in the 1700s. It includes information on the city's demography at the time. Gilberto M. Hinojosa of University of the Incarnate Word stated that "A Ranching Frontier" and "Wealth of Land" form "the core of the book".

== Reception ==
Donald E. Chipman of the University of North Texas praised the book for having "so many merits", being "nicely written", and having been "meticulously researched".

Hinojosa stated that "A Ranching Frontier" and "Wealth of Land" were the "strongest chapters".
