= Juan Davis Bradburn =

Brigadier general in the Mexican Army (1787–1842)

Juan Davis Bradburn (born John Davis Bradburn; 1787 – April 20, 1842) was a brigadier general in the Mexican Army. His actions as commandant of the garrison at Anahuac in Mexican Texas in 1831 and 1832 led to the events known as the Anahuac Disturbances.

Born and raised in the United States, Bradburn's first career was as a merchant and slave trader. He likely first entered Mexico in 1812 as part of the Gutiérrez–Magee Expedition fighting Spanish control of Texas. When the expedition was quashed, Bradburn moved to Louisiana, where he served in the Louisiana militia during the Battle of New Orleans. After his discharge, Bradburn spent several years fighting for Mexican independence. After Spain relinquished its hold on Mexico in 1821, Bradburn became an officer in the new Mexican Army, in which he served as a courier for Emperor Agustín de Iturbide.

In 1830, Bradburn established a new military and customs post, Anahuac, in Texas. The local settlers resented Bradburn's efforts to withhold land titles from those who had squatted in unauthorized areas. They were further angered by his attempts to enforce customs laws which had been largely ignored. The hard feelings escalated when Bradburn, following Mexican law, refused to return runaway slaves to their owners in the United States. After receiving a hoax letter claiming that armed men were marching on Anahuac to retrieve runaway slaves, Bradburn arrested local lawyers William B. Travis and Patrick Churchill Jack. Settlers were outraged that Travis did not receive some of the protections offered by the United States Bill of Rights, even though these rights were not guaranteed in Mexico. A large force of Texians marched on Anahuac to secure Travis's release. The resulting confrontation forced Bradburn's expulsion from Texas and encouraged other immigrants to take armed action against Mexican soldiers. As a result of his actions, Bradburn was "one of the most maligned men in historical accounts of" Texas in the 19th century.

== Early years ==
John Davis Bradburn was born in 1787 in Virginia. (Note: Although Mexican military records report his birthplace as Richmond, Virginia, Henson found no indication that any Bradburn families lived in the area. She believes he was likely born in one of the frontier counties of Virginia. Henson (1982), p. 20.) His father was probably William C. Bradburn, and John likely had an elder brother, also named William. At some point after 1800, the family moved to Christian County, Kentucky. As a young adult, Bradburn became a merchant in nearby Springfield, Tennessee. He trafficked in slaves and was once jailed in Natchez, Mississippi, over a disputed slave sale.

It is likely that Bradburn participated in the 1812 Gutiérrez–Magee Expedition, which intended to establish independent Mexican control of Spanish Texas. (Note: Biographer Margaret Swett Henson believes Bradburn participated in this expedition because of his election as a militia officer in 1814; most of the men who elected him were documented members of the expedition, and she speculates they would have only voted for someone who had already proven himself militarily. Henson (1982), p. 23.) The rebels were initially successful, taking Nacogdoches, Goliad, and provincial capital San Antonio de Béxar. After the execution of Governor Manuel María de Salcedo, many Americans left the movement in disgust. The remaining members of the expedition were decisively defeated by royalist forces at the Battle of Medina in August 1813; a few Americans escaped to Louisiana.

By 1814, Bradburn resided in Louisiana. Rumors abounded that British troops were preparing to land troops to capture the New Orleans region. After the December call for volunteers to help defend the state, Bradburn enlisted in the Eighteenth Louisiana Regiment and was elected third lieutenant. His unit arrived in New Orleans on January 24, just after the Battle of New Orleans, and remained until martial law ended March 11. (Note: Bradburn served alongside James Bowie and his brother Rezin. Edmondson (2000), p. 145.)

== Mexican War of Independence ==
Following his discharge from the militia, Bradburn remained in New Orleans. The Mexican War of Independence was raging, and many filibusters—men planning unauthorized military expeditions—gathered in the city to plan the liberation of Texas from Spanish control. Bradburn became a sergeant major in the movement led by Juan Pablo Anaya and Henry Perry. When Perry's forces entered Texas in early 1816, Bradburn was initially stationed in Nacogdoches to direct recruits and supplies to the main body of the expedition. In June, Bradburn joined Perry at his headquarters, a bluff along the Trinity River which became known as Perry's Point. Little activity occurred over the next few months.

In November 1816, another filibuster, Martín Javier Mina y Larrea, arrived with more men and supplies. Mina planned to invade Tampico and assist the revolutionary army in the Mexican interior. Bradburn allied himself with Mina, whose plan was better-developed than Perry's, and was soon appointed second-in-command of the American troops, under Colonel Gilford Young. The filibusters traveled to Fort Sombrero, an insurgent stronghold in Guanajuato province. Rebel supplies dwindled when the fort was besieged by Spanish royalist troops. Mina attempted to negotiate a surrender, but the Spanish offered safe passage only to native Mexicans; Americans and other foreigners were required to surrender at discretion. As the filibusters pondered this development, Young was killed, leaving Bradburn in sole command of the American troops. On August 19, he ordered a retreat. Spanish cavalrymen attacked, and less than one-quarter of the Americans escaped.

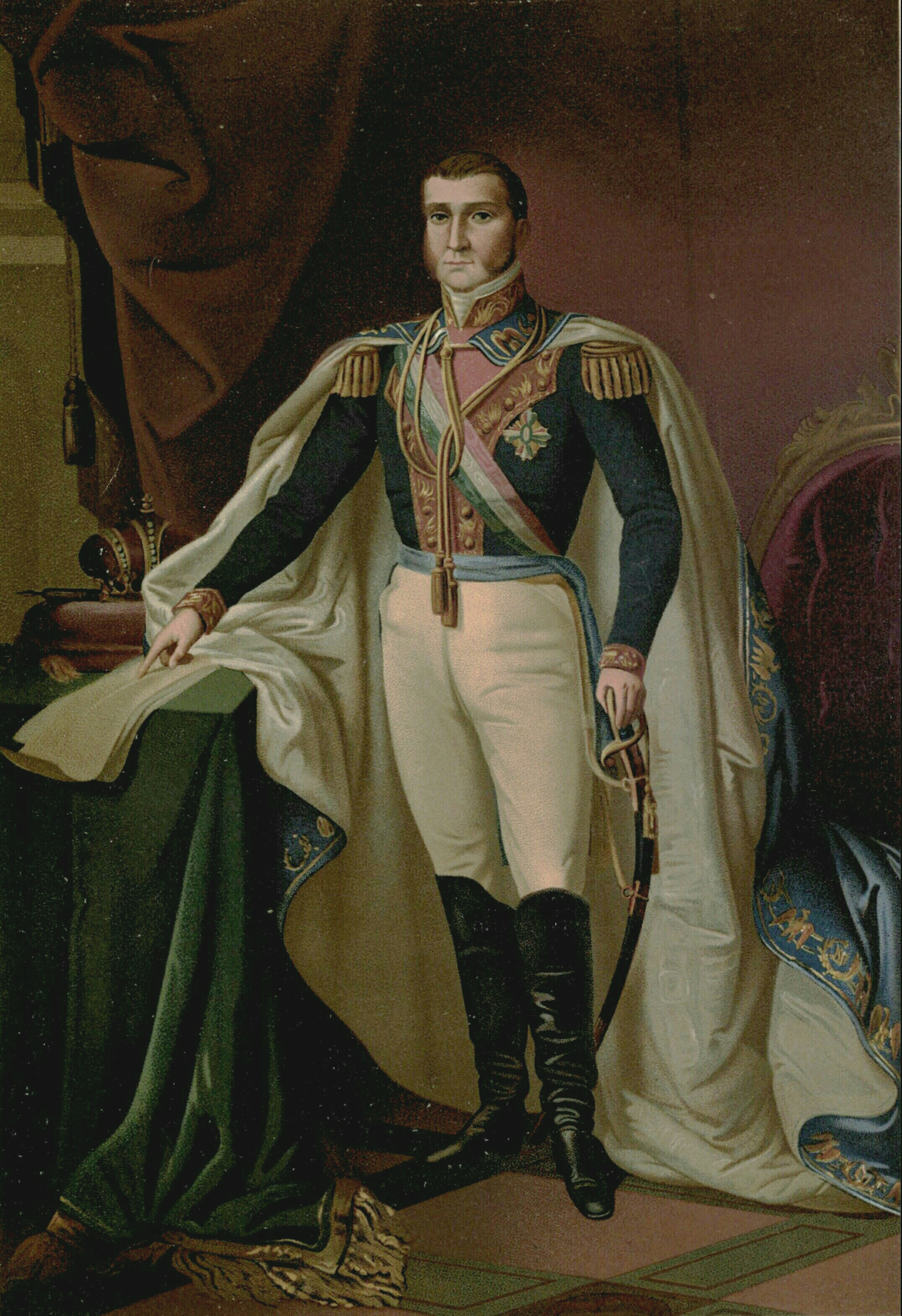
Bradburn served under Agustín de Iturbide (pictured).

Bradburn remained in Mexico and soon joined the forces led by Vicente Guerrero. Despite Guerrero's reputation for cruelty, the two men developed a close relationship. At least once, Bradburn countermanded Guerrero's orders, refusing to allow the execution of captured Spanish officers. His action impressed Agustín de Iturbide, the commander of the Spanish forces fighting Guerrero. In December 1820, Bradburn left the insurgent army to join Iturbide. Most Mexican historians believe his defection was due to a weariness with the conflict, though at least one historian speculates that Bradburn joined the Spanish Army as Guerrero's spy. Within a month, Bradburn had been appointed intermediary between Iturbide and Guerrero.

Iturbide defected from the Spanish Army, intending to place himself at the head of a new independent Mexico. He recruited his forces from both the Spanish and rebel armies, offering all who joined him an equal or higher rank in his new organization. Bradburn was appointed a colonel.

== Independent Mexico ==
In August 1821, Mexico officially received its independence from Spain. The following year Iturbide became emperor of Mexico and sent Bradburn as an envoy to the United States. Bradburn returned with news that the United States was prepared to recognize Mexico as an independent country. Later that year, Iturbide arranged Bradburn's marriage to a well-connected Mexican woman, María Josefa Hurtado de Mendoza y Caballero de los Olivos. Her brother, Agustín Hurtado, was the 9th Count of the Valley of Orizaba. Bradburn and his wife had one son, who entered the priesthood as a young man.

Iturbide was overthrown in 1823. The new government was based on federalist principles, and Bradburn, a staunch centralist, kept a discreet distance from politics over the next few years. He reappears in Mexican records in 1828, when he was granted a monopoly on steamboat traffic on the Rio Grande from the Gulf of Mexico through Coahuila. His charter was revoked in 1830 when he was unable to meet its terms. (Note: Bradburn was required to have the venture operational by April 1830. Political unrest and a threatened Spanish invasion had delayed the venture until early 1830. Bradburn then hired Henry Austin, a cousin of Texas empresario Stephen F. Austin, to run a steamboat. Austin discovered that the river was too shallow in some places and abandoned the idea. Henson (1982), pp. 44–45.)

== Texas ==
The new federalist government officially authorized immigration from the United States to Mexican Texas in 1824. The resulting mass influx of settlers, combined with failed attempts by the United States government to purchase the territory, concerned Mexican authorities, who feared that the United States wished to forcibly take Texas. In response, on April 6, 1830, the Mexican government enacted a series of laws restricting immigration from the United States. The laws also called for the establishment of customs houses within Texas to begin enforcing customs duties. On October 4, 1830, Bradburn was ordered to create the first customs post, to be located at Galveston Bay. He was chosen for the assignment partly because he was bilingual and would be able to communicate with both the immigrants from the United States and the native Mexicans and partly due to his knowledge of the area and its terrain.

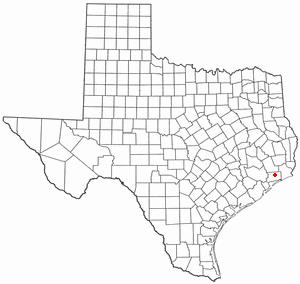
The dot shows the location of Anahuac, Texas.

Bradburn and his men arrived at Galveston Bay on October 26 and established a post atop the same 30-foot (9.1 m) bluff where Bradburn had camped with Perry. As ordered, Bradburn named the fort Anahuac after the Anahuac Valley, the ancient capital of the Aztecs. The soldiers erected two large kilns to produce bricks to build a more permanent fort. When the kilns were operational, however, Bradburn sold the bricks to settlers who wished to live near the fort. The town grew quickly and by June 1 the population had reached 300 civilians and 170 military personnel. At this point, Bradburn redirected his attention to building a permanent fort. The soldiers, who had been largely idle while the kilns produced bricks for settlers, were angry that they were now expected to do significant physical labor. Their displeasure was augmented by Bradburn's high standards; he often forced the men to tear down and rebuild sections that did not meet his benchmark for quality. Many soldiers deserted.

Bradburn also angered the colonists. The Mexican Constitution of 1824 prohibited immigrants from settling with 26 miles (42 km) of the coast, and many foreigners had established homes close to the coast. In January 1831, a new state land commissioner, José Francisco Madero, arrived to grant land titles to people who had settled in the area before 1830. Bradburn believed that only the federal government had the authority to grant titles in the area near the coast, and that as the representative of the federal government he was the only individual who could authorize surveys of the land.

Bradburn arrested Madero and his assistant, José María Jesús Carbajal. Within 10 days, Bradburn received orders from his superiors to release the men. Madero issued deeds as quickly as he could. Madero then established an official council, an ayuntamiento, for the residents in the disputed area. The new community, "Villa de la Santissima Trinidad de la Libertad", is now known as Liberty, Texas. Although Bradburn believed that Liberty was created illegally, as the town was too close to the coast, he made no attempt to interfere with its establishment. On December 9, Bradburn's superior, Commandant General Manuel Mier y Terán, ordered Bradburn to dismantle the town and establish the ayuntamiento at Anahuac.

=== Tariffs ===
The Mexican government had granted specific tariff exemptions to the first group of immigrants to Texas. Known as the Old Three Hundred, this initial colony had been established by empresario Stephen F. Austin. Most Texas colonists, including those who settled in Austin's other land grants, erroneously assumed the exemption applied to all settlers. With Bradburn's arrival, tariff collections began. After hearing complaints from ship captains, Bradburn's influence helped the law be amended to curtail some excessive charges. Nevertheless, colonists were angry that their goods were more expensive. Many of the settlers in Austin's colony also refused to accept that their exemption had expired and were vocal in their dislike of the tariffs and Bradburn. To keep the peace, Bradburn appointed local men to collect fees near Austin's colony; these men did not try to enforce the law rigidly, and tensions cooled.

In an effort to resolve the issues, Stephen F. Austin wrote Bradburn seeking help in getting the tariffs repealed throughout Texas. Bradburn promptly forwarded the letter up the chain of command. Bradburn's commander sent Austin a sharply-worded letter which, according to Bradburn's biographer Margaret Swett Henson, "remind[ed] the empresario that tariff was collected by every nation in the world but that only in Brazoria did it cause rioting". Austin blamed Bradburn for the reprimand.

=== Anahuac Disturbances ===
In January 1832, Bradburn received a letter listing 10 men in his jurisdiction who favored separating Texas from Mexico. From that point on, according to Henson, "Bradburn became increasingly obsessed about the Anglo-Americans and their intentions, believing that every event was part of a conspiracy to detach Texas". Several months later, local men organized a militia, supposedly to protect the settlement from Indian attacks. (Note: Not only was it Bradburn's duty to protect the settlers from external threats, the only natives in the area were peaceful. Henson (1982), p. 90.) Mexican law forbade residents from creating militias, so Bradburn arrested the ringleader, Patrick Jack. Although citizens were outraged, few were willing to intervene. An exception was Robert "Three-Legged Willie" Williamson—his threat to kill Bradburn resulted in Jack's release.

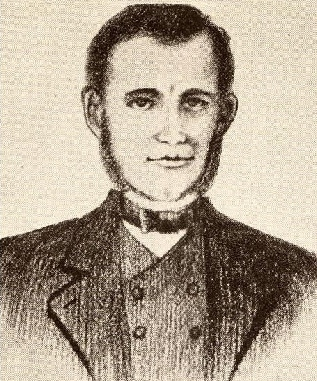
Bradburn's arrest of William Barret Travis (pictured) triggered the Anahuac Disturbances.

Bradburn was also worried about the intentions of Jack's law partner, William Barret Travis. The previous year, Bradburn had granted asylum to two men who had escaped slavery in Louisiana. (Note: Mexican law forbade slavery, but most American-born colonists disregarded the law, classifying their slaves as indentured servants with a 99-year contract.) Travis represented the men's owner in a series of failed attempts to return the former slaves to the United States. In May 1832, Bradburn received a letter warning that 100 armed men were stationed 40 miles (64 km) away, intent on reclaiming the slaves. After realizing the letter was a hoax, Bradburn arrested Travis for questioning. He intended to send Travis to Matamoros for a military trial on charges of attempted insurrection. Conviction on this charge would have led to Travis's execution. The settlers were outraged that the arrest did not require a warrant, a statement of charges, or trial by jury. Most were unfamiliar with Mexican law and assumed that the United States Bill of Rights still applied to them.

Jack threatened Bradburn, who angrily rearrested him. Colonists had reached their limit, and men began marching towards Anahuac from various Texas settlements. By early June, over 150 Texians had gathered. They elected Frank W. Johnson as commander. Without firing a shot, Johnson's group soon captured Bradburn's 19 cavalry officers, who had been trying to reconnoiter the Texian position. This left Bradburn with only 80 soldiers; the rest had deserted.

On June 10, the insurgents occupied buildings in northern Anahuac and began negotiations to peacefully end the dispute. Mexican officers agreed to release their prisoners into civilian custody if the Texians would release the captured cavalry officers and then withdraw from the town to Turtle Bayou. Although most of the rebels left Anahuac, 15 to 30 men remained scattered through the town. Bradburn believed this violated their agreement and in retaliation threatened to fire on the village within two hours. Most of the Texians believed that Bradburn had never intended to follow the agreement.

Fearing imminent cannon fire, the women and children of Anahuac fled. Mexican soldiers briefly engaged the men who remained, leading to the deaths of five Mexican soldiers and one Texan. After the skirmish, the remaining Texians gathered at Turtle Bayou to await the arrival of cannons that were stored at Brazoria. Taking advantage of the civil war currently engulfing the Mexican interior, the Texians drafted the Turtle Bayou Resolutions. In this document, they declared themselves federalists who supported rebellious Mexican general Antonio López de Santa Anna and decried "the present dynasty" which gave them military order instead of civil authority.

While the Texians waited for their artillery, Bradburn sent messages to Colonel Piedras, stationed at Nacogdoches (200 miles (320 km) north), and Colonel Elosúa at San Antonio (300 miles (480 km) to the west). On June 19, Piedras and about 100 of his men set out to reinforce Bradburn. Unsure how many Texians he actually faced, Piedras was eager to defuse the conflict without violence. At his urging, Bradburn agreed to relinquish his authority, but his chosen successor, Lieutenant Colonel Félix María Subarán, refused to take his place. (Note: Lieutenant Colonel Felix Maria Subarán had been sent to Texas as a political prisoner because he supported the federalist leader Antonio López de Santa Anna against the current centralist administration. Bradburn believed that Subarán would defend Texas against any separation attempts. Henson (1982), p. 103.) Piedras agreed to take temporary command of the garrison. On July 2, he transferred the prisoners to civilian authorities; within a week they were all released with no charges filed. Piedras left for Nacogdoches on July 8; three days later, the bulk of the Anahuac troops declared themselves federalists. Only Bradburn and a few others remained committed to the centralist cause.

== Later life ==
After an aborted assassination attempt—widely attributed to Travis—Bradburn resolved to leave Texas. None of the local ship captains would allow him passage. On July 13, Subarán announced that he would not guarantee the safety of any officers who still supported the centralist government. That night, Bradburn left Anahuac on foot. Years later, Anahuac carpenter William B. Scates related that after Bradburn's departure, locals gathered up the other centralist officers and tarred and feathered them before taking them into the water and "scour[ing] them with corn cobs to scrub their Bradburn sins off".

On August 6, Bradburn arrived in New Orleans and sought refuge with the Mexican consul. Many New Orleans residents had a highly unfavorable view of Bradburn; ten days earlier the local paper had published a letter from Travis describing Bradburn as a "tyrant" and saying that Travis had been jailed solely for his political opinions. Bradburn quickly booked passage to Matamoros. On arriving in Mexico, he learned that he had been officially relieved of his duties in Anahuac on June 29, before his superiors had learned of the armed conflict.

Bradburn remained in the army, fighting for the centralist government. Acting president Anastasio Bustamante promoted Bradburn to brigadier general after his bravery in a major battle on September 18. For the next few months, Bradburn commanded a regiment near Reynosa. In December, Bustamante and Santa Anna negotiated an end to the war. Bradburn's forces were merged with that of the federalist general operating in the same area, Lorenzo Cortina. Cortina commanded the joint regiment, and Bradburn retired from military service. For several years, Bradburn raised vegetables near Matamoros. Henson related that "a Texas visitor noted that [Bradburn] had the respect of the foreign community in the city, even the Anglo merchants".

When the Texas Revolution erupted in 1835, Bradburn rejoined the military under General José de Urrea on the condition that he was not required to fight in eastern Texas. Urrea's forces eradicated opposition along the Texas Gulf Coast, and Bradburn was left to command the small port at Copano, just north of the Nueces River. (Note: Bradburn did not participate in the Battle of Coleto or the Goliad Massacre. Henson (1982), p. 120.) In April 1836, Santa Anna (now president of Mexico) was captured at the Battle of San Jacinto and all Mexican troops were ordered to retreat beyond the Rio Grande. Bradburn remained at Copano to intercept Mexican supply vessels before they could fall into the hands of the Texians. In mid-May, he was ordered to retreat south to Refugio and wait for the arrival of a specific supply ship. His force was reduced to five men. After two deserted and the remainder fell ill, Bradburn set out alone and on foot for Mexico. He reached Matamoros in ill health on June 13.

Bradburn again served in the army during the federalist war in 1838, but by the end of 1840 he had retired to Matamoros. He died on April 20 and was buried on his ranch, likely east of present-day Mission. The property is now the home of the La Lomita Seminary, but there is no record of the location of Bradburn's grave.

== Legacy ==
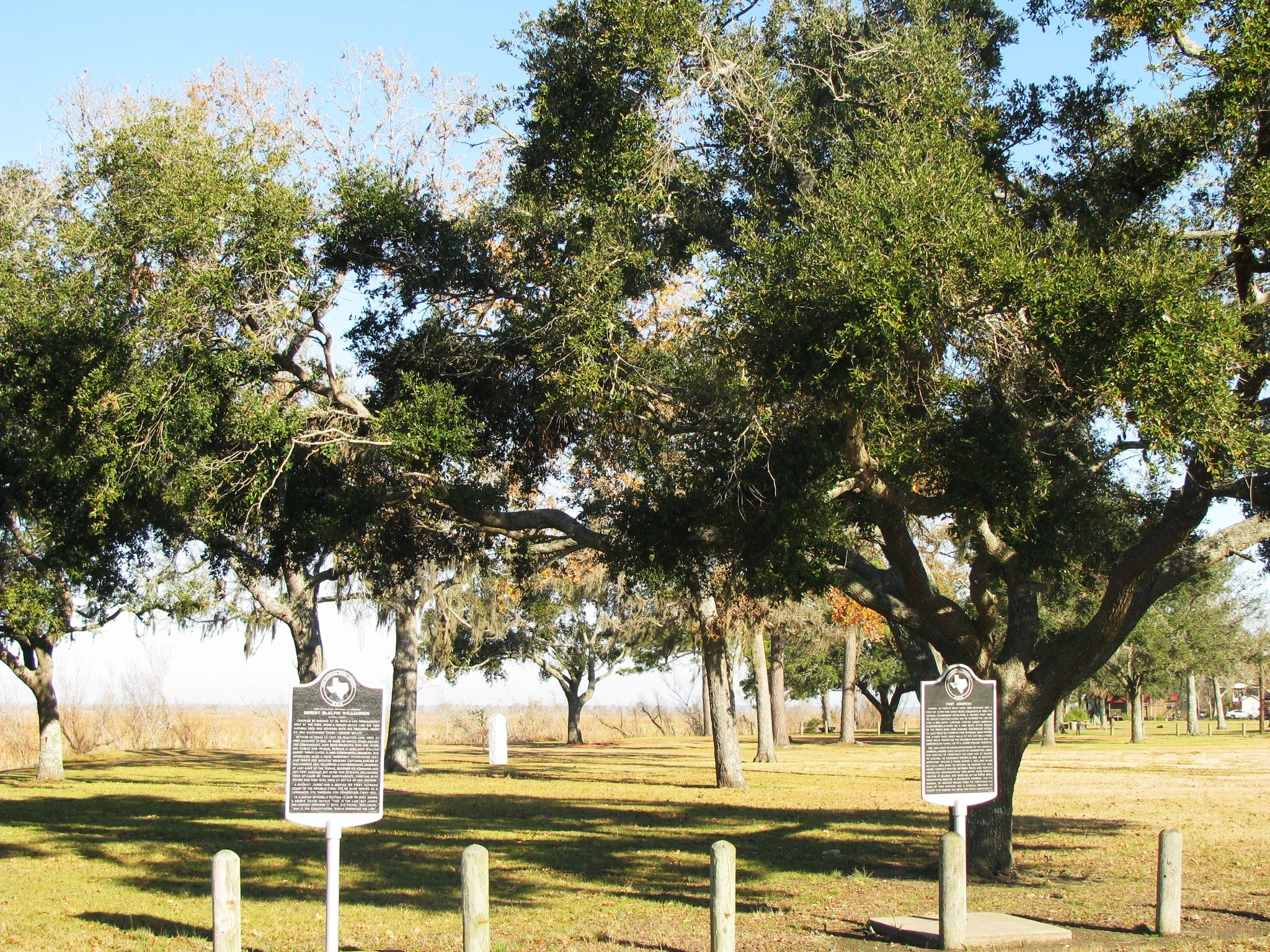
Historical markers in Anahuac commemorating Fort Anahuac and Robert McAlpin Williamson, who briefly secured Patrick Jack's release

Bradburn's death was announced in Texas newspapers in a very neutral manner. The Telegraph and Texas Register said simply that "Gen. Bradburn, who had long been in the Mexican service, and formerly commanded the garrison of Anahuac, lately died at Matamoros". The history books of the time did not speak kindly of his actions. In his 1841 book Texas and the Texans; or, Advance of the Anglo-Americans to the South-West Henry Stuart Foote described Bradburn as an "evil spirit, hovering, with gloomy and malignant aspect, in the rear of Santa Anna's army". Henson posits that Bradburn was "one of the most maligned men in historical accounts of that period", partially because he had no descendants to try to "preserv[e] his name and reputation in Texas".

Many of Bradburn's contemporaries appeared to share Stephen F. Austin's belief: "The fact is [Bradburn] is incompetent to such a command and is half crazy part of his time." His actions "appeared arbitrary and authoritarian to the colonists, who were ignorant about the power traditionally exercised by the Mexican military". Texians were further disgusted that Bradburn, who shared their American roots, often sided against American immigrants. According to historian J. R. Edmondson, colonists "would probably have resented any officer—Anglo or not—sent among them to initiate the collection of customs". Few Texans in the 19th century understood that Bradburn was following orders and attempting to enforce the national laws of Mexico, and that he was no longer bound by the laws of the United States. Even as late as the 20th century, historians often described Bradburn as a "petty tyrant".

The historian William C. Davis believes that Bradburn "overreacted and made heroes of two local malcontents whose actions their own people otherwise had not been much inclined to sanction". The resulting Turtle Bayou Resolutions empowered other Texians to follow a similar course of action. Many communities began declaring in favor of Santa Anna, and in August Piedras and his troops were driven from Nacogdoches. Their retreat into the Mexican interior temporarily left eastern Texas free of Mexican military control, encouraging the colonists to increase their political activity. Shortly thereafter, colonists organized the Convention of 1832, which marked the first attempt to gather Texians from each of the colonies to discuss their common goals.

Shortly after Bradburn left Texas, the garrison at Anahuac was dismantled. With no troops to purchase supplies, the civilians in the area soon dispersed. The fort was not regarrisoned until January 1835, when Captain Antonio Tenorio arrived with 40 men. His command was no more successful than Bradburn's. Within months, Travis led a group of insurgents to overthrow Tenorio in the second of the Anahuac Disturbances.

== Sources ==
- Davis, William C. (2006), Lone Star Rising, College Station, TX: Texas A&M University Press, ISBN 978-1-58544-532-5 originally published 2004 by New York: Free Press
- Edmondson, J.R. (2000), The Alamo Story-From History to Current Conflicts, Plano, TX: Republic of Texas Press, ISBN 1-55622-678-0
- Epperson, Jean L. (January 1989), "1834 Census – Anahuac Precinct, Atascosito District", Southwestern Historical Quarterly, vol. 92, no. 3, archived from the original on August 9, 2020
- Henson, Margaret Swett (1982), Juan Davis Bradburn: A Reappraisal of the Mexican Commander of Anahuac, College Station, TX: Texas A&M University Press, ISBN 978-0-89096-135-3
- Henson, Margaret Swett (July 1986), "Tory Sentiment in Anglo-Texan Public Opinion, 1832–1836", Southwestern Historical Quarterly, 90 (1)
- Manchaca, Martha (2001), Recovering History, Constructing Race: The Indian, Black, and White Roots of Mexican Americans, The Joe R. and Teresa Lozano Long Series in Latin American and Latino Art and Culture, Austin, TX: University of Texas Press, ISBN 0-292-75253-9
- Ward, Forrest E. (October 1960), "Pre-Revolutionary Activity in Brazoria County", Southwestern Historical Quarterly, 64 (2)
