= Robert McAlpin Williamson =

American judge

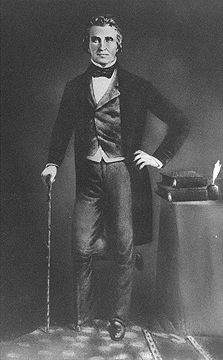
- Judge Robert McAlpin Williamson

Republic of Texas Supreme Court Justice
- In office 1837–1840

Robert McAlpin Williamson (1804? – December 22, 1859) was a Republic of Texas Supreme Court Justice, state lawmaker and Texas Ranger. Williamson County, Texas is named for him. He was the first white person documented to have played the banjo.

== Early life ==
Williamson was born in Wilkes County, Georgia to a prestigious family. His mother died shortly after and he was raised by his paternal grandmother, Sarah Gilliam, in Milledgeville, Georgia. At the age of fifteen, he contracted tuberculous arthritis that caused his right leg to permanently stiffen at a 90-degree angle. In order to walk, a wooden leg had to be fastened to his knee. Because of this, he later acquired the nickname "Three-Legged-Willie". He passed the bar at the approximate age of nineteen before practicing one year of law in Georgia.

== Life in Texas ==
Williamson came to Stephen F. Austin's colony (San Felipe de Austin) in June 1827. He became acquainted with both Stephen F. Austin and William B. Travis during this time. He co-founded the newspaper The Cotton Plant in 1829 and became the first prosecuting attorney for San Felipe shortly after. He later went on to edit the newspapers The Texas Gazette and The Mexican Citizen.

He was made the first Major of all the Rangers on November 28, in the Texas Rangers in 1835 and went on to participate in the Texas Revolution fighting in the Battle of Gonzales and the Battle of San Jacinto in William H. Smith's 2nd REG. "J" cavalry.

== Political activity ==
- 1833 – Delegate to Convention of 1833
- 1835 – Delegate to Consultation (Texas)
- 1837 to 1840 – Justice of Texas Republic Supreme Court
- 1840 to 1843 – Texas Republic House of Representatives
- 1843 to 1844 – Texas Republic Senate
- 1843 to 1844 – Texas Republic House of Representatives
- 1846 to 1848 – Texas State Senate
- 1849 – Unsuccessfully ran for U.S. Representative from Texas,
- 1851 – Unsuccessfully ran for Lieutenant Governor of Texas

== Death and burial ==
Williamson died in Wharton County, Texas on December 22, 1859 after a long illness. He is buried in the Texas State Cemetery.

== See also ==
- Statue of Robert McAlpin Williamson
