= Turtle Bayou, Texas =

- Unincorporated community
- Location within Texas Location within the United States
- Coordinates: 29°49′38″N 94°40′03″W
- Country: United States
- State: Texas
- County: Chambers
- Elevation: 30 ft (9.1 m)
- Time zone: UTC-6 (Central (CST))
  - Summer (DST): UTC-5 (CDT)
- Area code: 409
- GNIS feature ID: 2034881

Turtle Bayou is an unincorporated community in Chambers County, Texas, United States. According to the Handbook of Texas, the community had a population of 42 in 2000. It is located within the Greater Houston metro area.

== History ==
During the Battle of Velasco, Turtle Bayou was the site of the Turtle Bayou Resolutions. Set forth by the Texians, the resolutions called for loyalty and more widespread rebellion against the current government.

== Education ==
Anahuac Independent School District operates schools in the area.
