= Turtle Bayou Resolutions =

1832 documents

In 1832, the Anglo-American settlers were involved in a conflict with Mexican commander John Davis Bradburn (also an Anglo-American) near the northern extent of Trinity Bay at Anahuac, Texas. The settlers were opposed to control of their daily affairs by the centralist government. They were primarily at odds with the administration over the subject of tariffs on imports and exports and over the presence of conscripted criminals in the Mexican garrison at Anahuac located at the confluence of the Trinity river and bay four miles south of the Turtle Bayou crossing, whom the colonists blamed for a number of local crimes. The simmering conflict reached a head when Bradburn took in two escaped enslaved people from Louisiana. Though slavery was officially illegal in Mexico, the Mexican authorities wanted to encourage Anglo-American colonization of the frontier and tolerated indentured servants for ten years, among the colonists. Among that population included three previously enslaved people who escaped from Louisiana and were given asylum by Bradburn. Two local lawyers, William B. Travis and Patrick C. Jack, attempted to return the freed people to the American who claimed to own them but were arrested and held in the Anahuac garrison after they had forged a letter to Bradburn threatening armed intervention from Louisiana militia.

The original site of "Fort Anahuac" is now part of a public park in Anahuac, Chambers County Texas. The Anglo militia skirmished with Bradburn's troops before retreating north to the crossing on Turtle Bayou near James Taylor White's ranch house to await the arrival of artillery. The settlers received word that the anti-administration Federalist army had won a significant victory under the leadership of Antonio López de Santa Anna.

== Colonists react ==
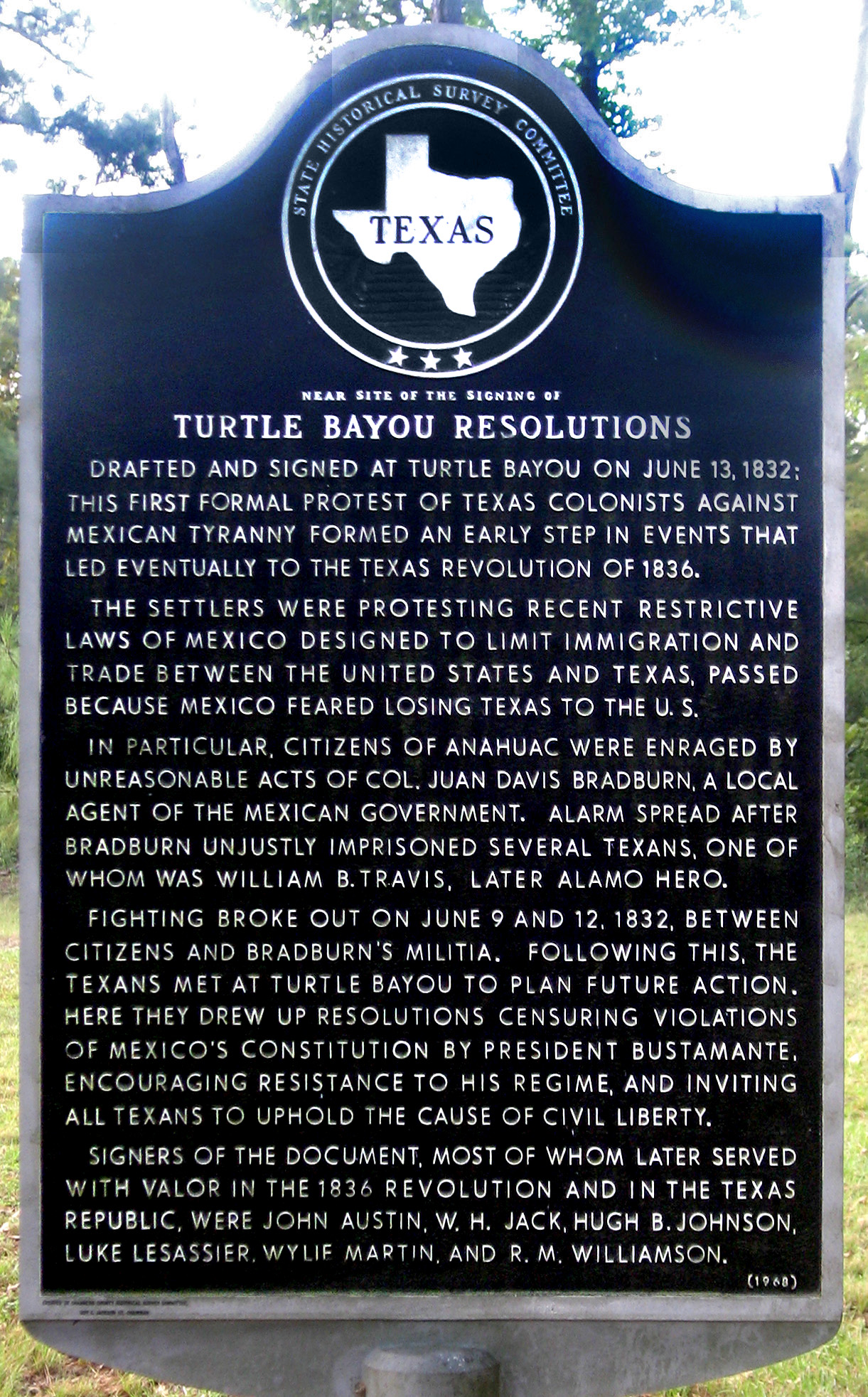
Turtle Bayou Resolutions historical marker

Taking advantage of this favorable news, they verbally aligned themselves with the Federalist cause by composing the Turtle Bayou Resolutions, which explained their attack against the Centralist troops at Anahuac. They explained that they were not lawless Anglos attacking a Mexican garrison, but that they were Federalist sympathizers opposing a Centralist commandant as part of the civil war that had been in progress for two years between the Centralist administration of Anastasio Bustamante and those wanting to return to the Federalist Constitution of 1824.

The four resolutions condemned violations of the 1824 constitution by the Bustamante government and urged all Texans to support the patriots fighting under Santa Anna, who was at the time struggling to defeat military despotism. Though opinions varied among the colonists, few Texans were at that time willing to urge secession.

Federalist colonel José Antonio Mexía arrived in Brazoria, Texas, on July 16, 1832, with 400 troops and five ships to quell a supposed movement to sever Texas from Mexico. A copy of the Turtle Bayou Resolutions was included in the seven-point statement of causes for taking up arms that was presented to Mexía on July 18. The explanations offered by the Texas leaders satisfied the Federalist general, and he returned to the Rio Grande.

== The document ==
No signatures are affixed to the extant copy of the resolutions themselves, but seven of the Texas leaders (Wyly Martin, John Austin, Luke Lesassier, William H. Jack, Hugh B. Johnston, Francis W. Johnson, and Robert M. Williamson) signed the combined document presented to Mexía.

The document was published in an extra edition of the Brazoria Constitutional Advocate on July 23, 1832, and appeared in Mary Austin Holley's Texas (1833).

Text of the Turtle Bayou Resolutions

First: By their repeated violations of the constitution and laws and the total disregard of the civil and political rights of the people.

Second: Jose G Granado fixing and establishing among us, in the time of peace, military posts, the officers of which, totally disregarding the local civil authorities of the State, have committed various acts evincing opposition to the true interest of the people in the enjoyment of civil liberty.

Third: By arresting the commissioners, especially Juan Francisco Madero, who, on the part of the State government, was to put the inhabitants east of Trinity River in possession of other lands, in conformity with the laws of colonization.

Fourth: By the imposition of military force, preventing the Alcalde of the jurisdiction of Liberty from the exercise of his constitutional functions.

Fifth: By appointing to the revenue department of Galveston, a man whose character for infamy had been clearly established, and made known to the Government, and whose principles are avowedly to the true interest of the people of Texas; and that, too, when their character for infamy had been repeatedly established.

Sixth: By the military commandant of Anahuac advising and procuring servants to quit the service of their masters, and offering them protection; causing them to labor for his benefits, and refusing to compensate them for the same.

Seventh: By imprisonment of our citizens without lawful cause; and claiming the right of trying said citizens by a military court for offense of a character cognizable by the civil authority alone.

RESOLVED That we view with feelings of the deepest regret, Tori Tercero manner in which the Government of the Republic of Mexico is administered by the present dynasty - The repeated violations of the constitution - the total disregard for the law - the entire prostration of the civil authority; and the substitution in the stead of military despotism, are grievances of such a character, as to arouse the feelings of every freeman, and impel him to resistance.

RESOLVED That we view with feelings of deepest interest and solicitude, the firm and manly resistance which is made by those patriots under the highly and distinguished chieftain Santa Anna, to the numerous encroachments and infractions which have been made by the present administration upon the laws and constitution of our beloved and adopted country.

RESOLVED That as freemen devoted to a correct interpretation and enforcement of the Constitution, and laws, according to their true Spirit - We pledge our lives and fortunes in support of the same, and of the distinguished leader, who is now gallantly fighting in defence of Civil Liberty.

RESOLVED That all the people of Texas be united to co-operate with us, in support of the principles incorporated in the foregoing resolutions.

== Images ==
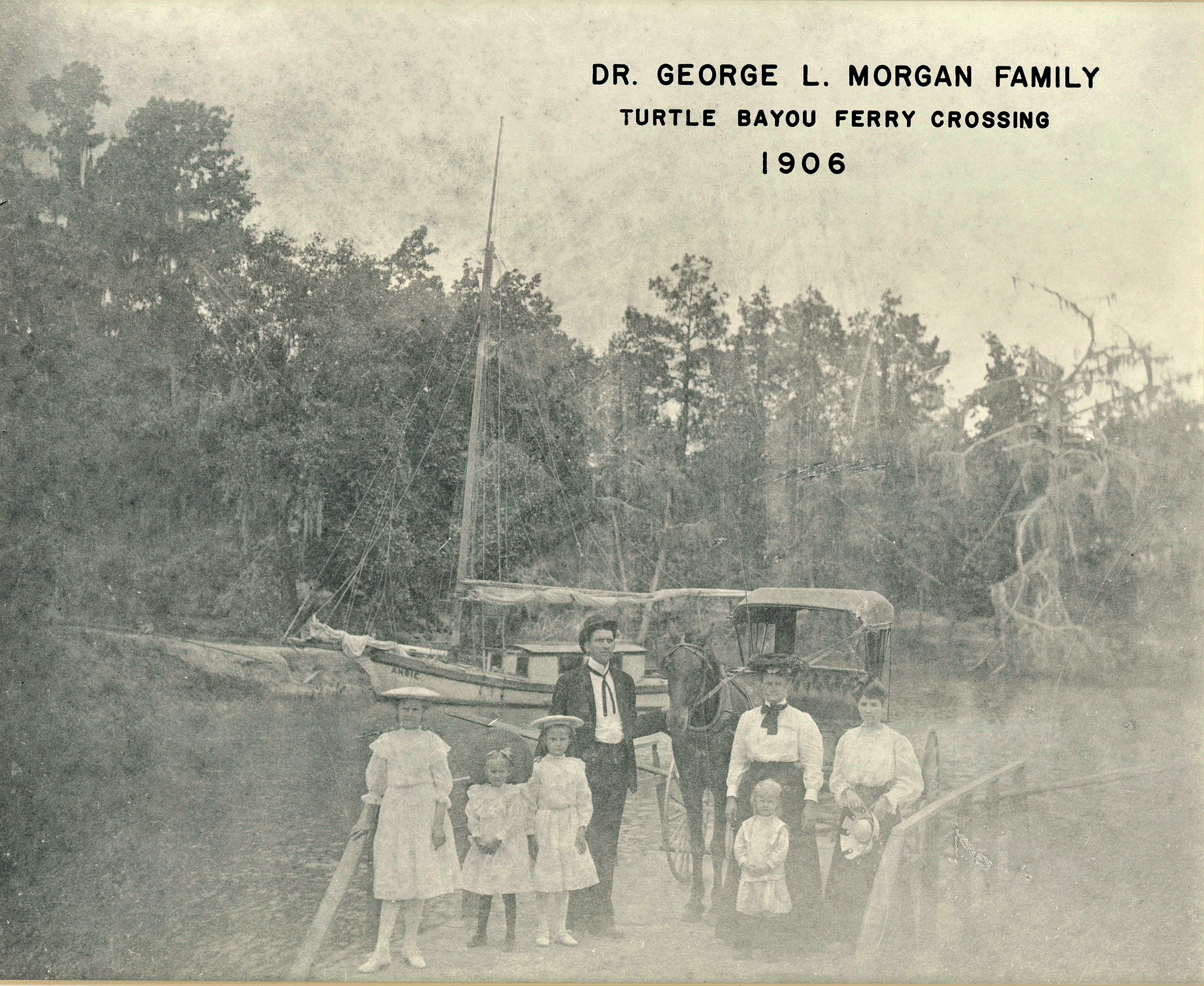
Landing at Turtle Bayou circa 1906 -Chambers County Museum at Wallisville, Texas
