= Texan brig Potomac =

- Brig Potomac

History

Republic of Texas
- Name: Potomac
- Namesake: Potomac River
- Commissioned: 1838
- Decommissioned: 1843
- Home port: Galveston, Texas
- Fate: Converted to pilot boat in Galveston harbor

General characteristics
- Class & type: Brig
- Beam: 28
- Propulsion: wind
- Speed: variable
- Complement: 28

The Texan brig Potomac was a ship of the Second Texas Navy that never sailed as a warship. For a while, in 1838, she was the only ship in the Texas Navy. She was decommissioned in 1843.

== Background of the Texas Navy ==
The Texas Navy was officially formed in January 1836, with the purchase of four schooners: Invincible, Brutus, Independence, and Liberty. These ships, under the command of Commodore Charles Hawkins, helped Texas win independence by preventing a Mexican blockade of the Texas coast, seizing Mexican ships carrying reinforcements and supplies to its army, and sending their cargoes to the Texas volunteer army. Nevertheless, Mexico refused to recognize Texas as an independent country. By the middle of 1837, all of the ships had been lost at sea, run aground, captured, or sold. With no ships to impede a possible invasion by Mexico, Texas was vulnerable to attack.

In 1838, President Mirabeau B. Lamar responded to this threat by forming a second Texas Navy. Unlike Sam Houston, Lamar was an ardent supporter of the Texas Navy and saw the urgent need for its continuation. The second Texas Navy was placed under the command of Commodore Edwin Ward Moore, an Alexandria Academy graduate who was recruited from the United States Navy. One of the ships of this second navy was the Potomac.

== History of the Potomac ==
The merchant brig Potomac was bought for the Texas Navy by the Secretary of the Navy from Capt. L. M. Hitchcock in early 1838 for $8,000. It was the only ship in the navy until the Texan schooner Zavala was purchased in November 1838.

The Secretary of the Navy, Memucan Hunt, Jr. spent over $10,000 equipping the Potomac for service, but as the sale had never been completed due to the Texas Congress not having approved the expenditure of funds to purchase Potomac, the work was suspended without being completed.

Eventually, President Lamar completed the purchase, but the Potomac was never completely fitted out for service. By 1840, her crew was ordered aboard the Wharton and she was in use in Galveston as a receiving ship.

In 1843, with the Potomac unfit to serve as a warship, she was transferred to other public use with the Galveston Harbormaster as a pilot ship. She ended her career in the Texas Navy never having left port or fired a weapon in conflict.
