= Texan sloop-of-war Austin =

History

Republic of Texas
- Namesake: Stephen F. Austin
- Builder: William and George Gardner Baltimore
- Launched: 1839
- Commissioned: 5 January 1840
- Decommissioned: 11 May 1846
- Renamed: Originally called the Texas
- Home port: Galveston, Texas
- Fate: Transferred to the U.S. Navy upon annexation of Texas; towed to Pensacola, run aground and broken up, 1848

General characteristics
- Class & type: Sloop of War
- Displacement: 600 tons
- Length: 125 ft (38 m)
- Beam: 31 ft (9.4 m)
- Draught: 12.5 ft (3.8 m)
- Propulsion: wind
- Complement: 23 officers; 151 sailors & marines
- Armament: 16-24 pounders.; 2-18 pounders., medium; 2-18 long pounders

Austin was a sloop-of-war of the Texas Navy, serving as its flagship from 1840 to 1846. Commanded by Commodore Edwin Ward Moore, she led a flotilla in the capture of Villahermosa in 1840. After a period of inaction in port, Austin participated in the Naval Battle of Campeche in 1843. She was transferred to the United States Navy when Texas was annexed by the United States in 1845, but was run aground and broken up in 1848.

== Background of the Texas Navy ==
The Texas Navy was officially formed in January 1836, with the purchase of four schooners: Invincible, Brutus, Independence, and Liberty. These ships, under the command of Commodore Charles Hawkins, helped Texas win independence by preventing a Mexican blockade of the Texas coast, seizing Mexican ships carrying reinforcements and supplies to its army, and sending their cargoes to the Texas volunteer army. Nevertheless, Mexico refused to recognize Texas as an independent country. By the middle of 1837, all of the ships had been lost at sea, run aground, captured, or sold. With no ships to impede a possible invasion by Mexico, Texas was vulnerable to attack.

In 1838, President Mirabeau B. Lamar responded to this threat by forming a second Texas Navy. Unlike Sam Houston, Lamar was an ardent supporter of the Texas Navy and saw the urgent need for its continuation. The second Texas Navy was placed under the command of Commodore Edwin Ward Moore, an Alexandria Academy graduate recruited from the United States Navy. One of the ships of this second navy was the Austin, which served as the flagship of the navy.

== History of the Austin ==
Pennant of the Austin

The Austin, named after Stephen F. Austin, was originally slated to be named the Texas. Built in the Baltimore shipyard of William and George Gardner in 1839, Austin was referred to as a sloop-of-war and had a full ship rig.

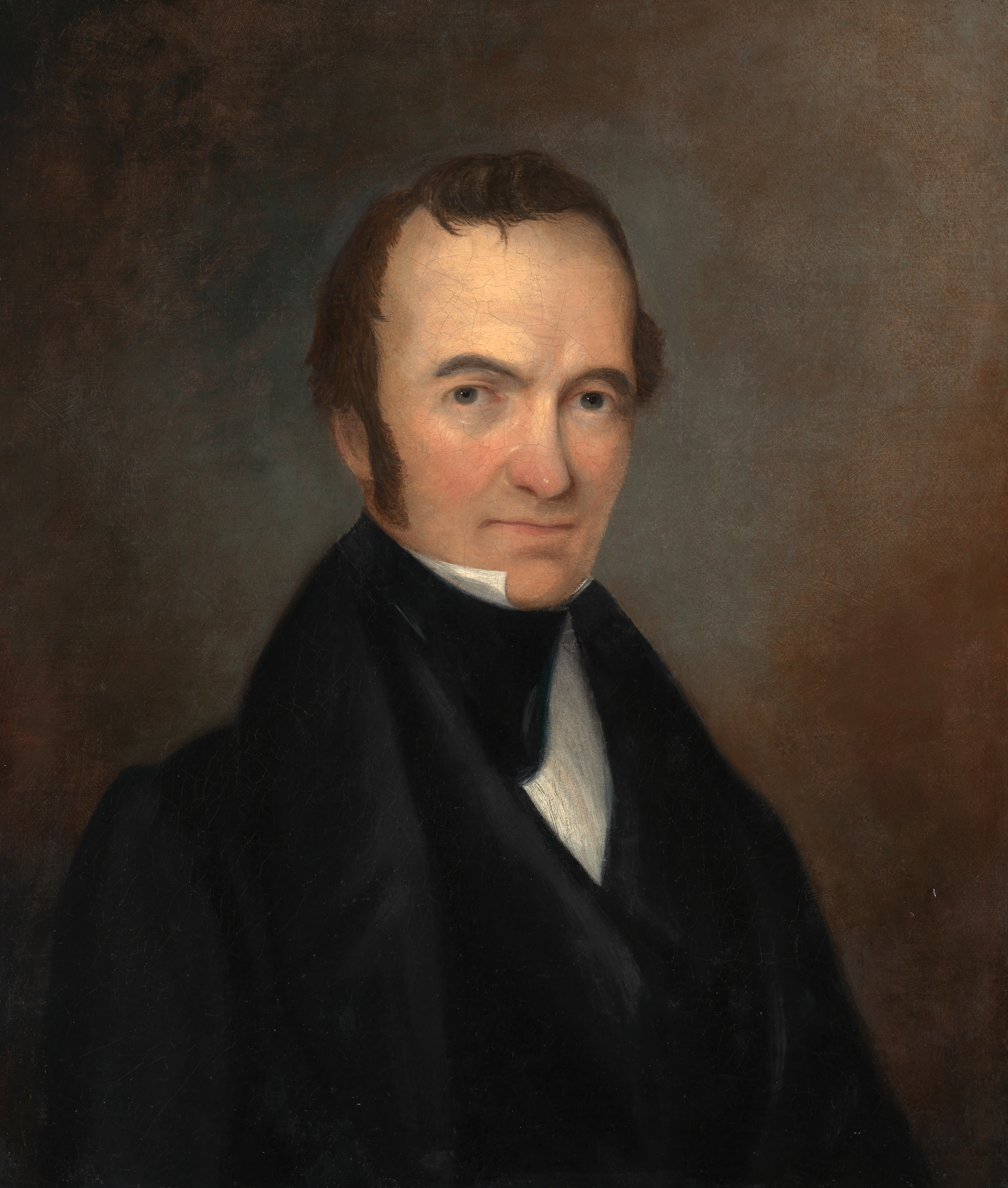
Stephen F. Austin, namesake of the flagship of the Second Texas Navy

Austin was 125 feet in length and 31 feet across the beam, with a displacement of 600 tons and a draft of 12½ feet. She carried a crew of twenty-three officers and warrant officers and 151 sailors and marines and was armed with sixteen medium twenty-four-pound cannons, two eighteen-pound medium cannons, and two eighteen-pound long cannons.

== Career ==
Upon arrival in Galveston, the Austin's crew underwent months of training before the ship was dispatched in June 1840 to the Yucatán Peninsula, where a rebellion had broken out by the short-lived Republic of Yucatán against the central government in Mexico City. Commodore Moore was ordered to confer with the rebel leaders, but not to commence hostilities against Mexico until a delegation of Texas diplomats had completed a mission to secure recognition of Texas' independence. Thus Austin spent her time cruising around the gulf coast of Mexico and Yucatán gathering intelligence and investigating ports and suitable anchorages. When a large storm blew up near Lobos Island on 14 October 1840, Austin came upon a Mexican ship in distress. Austin recovered all of the crew of the stricken ship Fama, delivering them to Tampico to great local acclaim. This did not deter a Mexican shore battery from opening fire a few days later on the flagship as she was close to the Mexican shore looking to replenish her water stores. Concluding that hostilities had recommenced, Commodore Moore hastened to rejoin his flotilla near Campeche.

=== Tabasco attack ===
Upon reaching the Cayos Arcas, where the rest of his flotilla had remained, Moore found that the San Jacinto had run aground on a sand bar and the rest of the ships were not to be seen. Austin set out to find the rest of the ships, Zavala and San Bernard, touching at the port of Campeche on 8 November and Sisal on 10 November. The flagship finally caught up with the rest of the ships at Frontera on 14 November. In order to salvage the San Jacinto and provide fuel for the lone steamship, Zavala, Moore hatched a plan to gain money. The Zavala towed the other two ships 60 miles up the San Juan Bautista River to the capital of the Mexican state of Tabasco, Villahermosa. There the small flotilla pointed their guns at the city and then sent troops into the seemingly deserted capital. Commodore Moore encountered a man bearing a white flag on a tree branch, and when he ascertained that this was the Mayor, the Texas commodore demanded $25,000 or he would level the town. The Mayor asked if silver would be acceptable, and upon receiving an affirmative reply, delivered the ransom. The commodore set sail with the silver and used the money to repair and outfit his ships.

Returning to the wreck of the San Jacinto, Austin picked up the sick sailors and returned to Galveston, crossing the bar on 1 February 1841. During Austin's absence, Texas had achieved a hard-won diplomatic recognition from the United Kingdom. Moore wanted to repair and recruit quickly in New Orleans and then continue to press Mexico by sea. Instead, President Lamar decided to pull back and allow Britain to try to negotiate a settlement between Texas and Mexico. Moore was ordered to put most of his ships "in ordinary" in Galveston. Austin's crew were placed in reduced commission with most seamen discharged, and the ship only serving on harbor patrol. She remained there through most of 1841 before returning to full commission early in December 1841.

=== Second cruise ===
Austin once again sailed for Yucatán on 13 December 1841, the day President Sam Houston was inaugurated for a second non-consecutive term. Houston's opposition to the navy may have played a role in the decision to sail that day. During this cruise, Yucatán rebels paid $8,000 a month toward the maintenance of the Texas Navy.

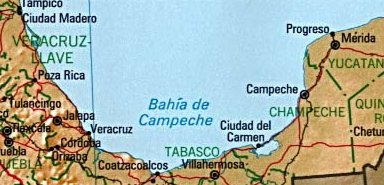
Map of the Bay of Campeche, scene of most of the exploits of the Austin

After a re-provisioning stop in New Orleans, Austin arrived at Sisal on 6 January 1842 where she met up with San Bernard and the San Antonio. From there the flotilla, under the command of Commodore Moore, again cruised the Mexican coast in search of prizes. After a stop at the port of Campeche, they continued on to Veracruz where they took up station as close to shore as conditions permitted. On 6 February, Austin and San Bernard sighted, pursued, and captured the 180-ton Mexican brig Progreso which was sent to Galveston with a small prize crew. Throughout the month of February, bad weather plagued the two Texas ships and they captured no more ships. On 17 February, Austin hoisted the United States flag and sailed into Veracruz harbor to get a first-hand look at the Mexican situation. In Veracruz, Moore saw with alarm an old commercial steamer undergoing naval conversion and a new schooner readying as well. Austin released her captives in Progreso's boats, exited the harbor, and set sail for Cayo Arcos and rendezvous with the San Antonio.

Eventually, the three Texan ships reunited and stopped in Carmen for water and repairs, where they remained until 28 March 1842. Upon departure, the flotilla under command of Austin made for Veracruz and instituted a blockade of the port. While conducting the blockade, Austin captured the Mexican ships Dolorita and Dos Amigos, sending prize crews with them to Galveston. After sending Dos Amigos to Galveston accompanied by San Bernard, Austin headed for Sisal, arriving on 18 April. The following day, San Bernard arrived off Sisal with orders for Commodore Moore to return to Texas to confer with President Houston. The Texas squadron departed the Yucatán coast on 26 April and set a direct course for Galveston, arriving at the beginning of May 1842.

=== A period of inactivity ===
In Galveston, Austin was at anchor while Commodore Moore met with President Houston and Secretary of War and Marine George Washington Hockley to make plans for the Texan fleet. Moore discovered that Houston would not release $20,000 in discretionary money recently appropriated by the Texas Congress for the navy, and thus the sailors and officers would not be paid for the second consecutive year; many sailors deserted. Despite Houston's lack of support for the navy, he did not hesitate to use it when it suited his needs. He ordered a blockade of Mexico in July 1842 and released just over $18,000 for the repair and provisioning of the ships. However, the repairs took so long to complete that the blockade never materialized. Then, in September 1842, General Adrian Woll led a large force of Mexican regulars in an invasion of Texas, capturing San Antonio in what has become known as the Woll Invasion.

In response to public outrage at the capture of San Antonio, Houston ordered the Austin and the brig Wharton to sail to Mexico and engage a Mexican fleet that contained new and larger ships, the Moctezuma and the Guadalupe, and to support another rebellion in the Yucatán in order to force Mexico to the bargaining table. The flotilla would not leave New Orleans until 15 April 1843.

=== Naval Battle of Campeche ===
The Mexican fleet now possessed the ships Guadalupe and Montezuma. Guadalupe was a Laird-built iron-hulled paddle frigate of 768 tons equipped with two 68-pound pivot guns that fired exploding shells. Moore hoped to encounter the Guadalupe separate from her escort Montezuma.

Austin and Wharton made for the Yucatán coast and encountered the Mexican squadron on 30 April 1843 between Lerma and Campeche. Montezuma and Guadalupe, along with four smaller vessels, comprised the Mexican fleet. The Texans were augmented by two Yucatecan ships and five small gunboats, but were clearly the smaller fleet.

Seeing the Mexican fleet, Moore, on board the flagship Austin, exclaimed: "Damn them, give it to them!" There was a two-hour running battle in which the Austin was struck once in the fighting and lost some of her mizzen rigging. The commander of the Montezuma and twenty of his crew were killed. After a few hours, the Mexican sailing ships departed and only the two steamers remained. The Mexican blockade of the port of Campeche was lifted, however, and the Texan ships put into the port for repairs. Moore was determined to upgrade his guns in Campeche; Austin received two long-range 18-pounders from the Yucatecans ashore and Wharton took on board a single, long-range 12-pounder.

The Texas fleet waited for an opening to leave port and engage the Mexican ships again. Eventually the winds and the Mexican fleet, desiring a confrontation with the smaller Texan squadron, lured the Austin and Wharton out of port on 16 May 1843. With the wind pushing them forward, the two Texan ships engaged the larger Mexican adversaries despite heavy damage to the Austin and three dead. The Mexicans fared worse, losing 183 sailors, and were forced to leave the scene. This battle would represent the only time that steam-driven warships would be defeated by sail powered ships. The scene was memorialized on the engraving on the cylinder of the famed Colt Navy Revolver.

=== After Campeche ===
Austin under Moore returned victorious to Campeche only to discover that in March, President Houston had declared the ships and their men pirates. Moore wanted to return to Galveston and answer the charges, but hostile Mexican fleets delayed the Austin until 29 June 1843. Austin and Wharton arrived in Galveston on 14 July 1843 to a tumultuous welcome. The sailors of Austin were never court-martialed, but Moore and Lieutenant C.B. Snow were relieved of their commissions, and subsequently all but three officers of the Texas Navy resigned. With no officers or seamen, Austin remained in port in Galveston.

== USS Austin ==
After Texas was formally annexed into the United States in 1845, Austin was commissioned into the U.S. Navy on 11 May 1846 under the name USS Austin, the first ship of that name. She was in poor condition when towed to the Pensacola Navy Yard, where she was used as a receiving ship until, two years later in 1848, USS Austin was run aground and broken up. According to the commandant of the Pensacola Navy Yard, she was "unworthy of repairs."
