= Texan schooner San Antonio =

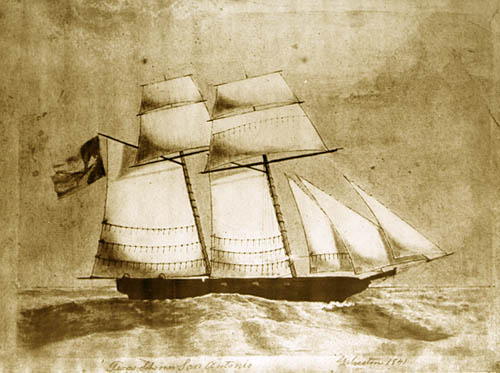
- Schooner San Antonio

History

Republic of Texas
- Namesake: San Antonio River
- Builder: Schott and Whitney, Baltimore
- Launched: 1836
- Commissioned: 27 June 1839
- Decommissioned: October 1842
- Renamed: Originally called the Asp
- Home port: Galveston, Texas
- Fate: Lost at sea

General characteristics
- Class & type: Schooner
- Displacement: 170 tons
- Length: 66 feet
- Beam: 21.5
- Draught: 8 ft.
- Propulsion: wind
- Speed: variable
- Complement: 13 officers; 69 sailors & marines
- Armament: 4-12 lb. med.; 1-9 lb. long

The Texan schooner San Antonio was a two-masted schooner of the Second Texas Navy from 1839 to 1840. She was the sister ship of the San Jacinto and the San Bernard. In 1840, San Antonio was part of the Texas Navy flotilla led by Commodore Edwin Ward Moore which was dispatched to assist Yucatecan rebels that had taken up arms against Mexico. In February 1842, while re-provisioning in New Orleans, the crew of the San Antonio mutinied and the Lieutenant was killed. This was the only mutiny in the history of the Texas Navy. That fall, the San Antonio sailed for Campeche and was never heard from again.

== Background of the Texas Navy ==
The Texas Navy was officially formed in January 1836, with the purchase of four schooners: Invincible, Brutus, Independence, and Liberty. These ships, under the command of Commodore Charles Hawkins, helped Texas win independence by preventing a Mexican blockade of the Texas coast, seizing Mexican ships carrying reinforcements and supplies to its army, and sending their cargoes to the Texas volunteer army. Nevertheless, Mexico refused to recognize Texas as an independent country. By the middle of 1837, all of the ships had been lost at sea, run aground, captured, or sold. With no ships to impede a possible invasion by Mexico, Texas was vulnerable to attack.

In 1838, President Mirabeau B. Lamar responded to this threat by forming a second Texas Navy. Unlike Sam Houston, Lamar was an ardent supporter of the Texas Navy and saw the urgent need for its continuation. The second Texas Navy was placed under the command of Commodore Edwin Ward Moore, an Alexandria Academy graduate who was recruited from the United States Navy. One of the ships of this second navy was the San Antonio, along with her sister ships, the San Jacinto and San Bernard.

== History of the San Antonio ==
Pennant of the San Antonio

Originally built as one of the Baltimore clippers at the Schott and Whitney shipyard in Baltimore, Maryland and called Asp, she was one of the smallest of a class of schooners and brigs built specifically for the slave trade between 1820 and 1850. A group of six schooners, including La Amistad was built in Baltimore around 1836. They were identified as being "[p]urposely built and fitted out for use in the slave trade by the United States Consul General in Havana", and Asp was typical of the class.

=== On patrol and carrying dispatches ===
On 26 June 1840, the San Antonio sailed from Galveston with the rest of the flotilla under the command of Commodore Edwin W. Moore. After a two-month cruise, San Antonio returned to Galveston with James Treat, who had unsuccessfully sought diplomatic recognition for Texas from the Mexican government. For the rest of 1840, San Antonio patrolled Texas waters, conducting surveying and cartographic operations and suppressing smuggling.

Joining the flagship Austin and her sister ship San Bernard, San Antonio set sail for the Yucatan again on 13 December 1841. The flotilla reached Sisal on 6 January 1842, but she returned to Galveston on 31 January with dispatches from Commodore Moore. Texas Secretary of War and Marine George Washington Hockley sent orders to Moore by way of the San Antonio for him to return to Galveston immediately with the ships. But the San Antonio called first at New Orleans to land the survivors of a shipwreck and to procure supplies for the fleet.

=== Mutiny ===
On 11 February 1842, with the principal officers of the schooner on shore, a number of seamen who had been drinking demanded they be allowed to go ashore. The Officer of the Watch, Lieutenant Charles Fuller, ordered the marine guard to defend the ship, only to have the sergeant of marines, Seymour Oswald, strike him on the head with a tomahawk. Fuller drew his Colt revolver, and in the melee that followed, Fuller was shot dead and his body was beaten with muskets and cutlasses. Two midshipmen were also injured, and another lieutenant was locked below deck. The mutineers fled from the ship, but they soon were apprehended by the United States revenue cutter Jackson and placed in the New Orleans jail. Two of the mutinous sailors were returned to the ship, while the rest remained in New Orleans, pending extradition.

The schooner San Antonio with all her sails set

=== Final voyages ===
From New Orleans the San Antonio sailed for the Cayos Arcas where San Jacinto had wrecked, and from there to Sisal. Commodore Moore dispatched her to pick up Thomas S. Lubbock, a survivor of President Mirabeau B. Lamar's Santa Fe expedition, who had escaped his captors and made his way to Yucatan. The ship then rejoined the fleet at New Orleans on 1 July. Moore dispatched the schooner to Yucatán about 1 October 1842 by way of Galveston and Matagorda to attempt to raise funds for the fast-failing Texas fleet. She never reached Campeche, however, but was lost at sea.

== Fate of the Mutineers ==
The state of Louisiana refused to extradite most of the sailors accused of mutiny and killing Lieutenant Fuller. Furthermore, many witnesses had gone down with their ship when it was lost in October. Nevertheless, Commodore Moore tried those hands aboard his flagship in April 1843. Three were sentenced to lashes, and four were sentenced to death. They were hanged from the yardarm of the Austin on 26 April 1843. Sergeant Oswald escaped jail in New Orleans and was never brought to justice, and Frederick Shepard, a mutineer who was spared because he testifying against the others, was killed in action three weeks later in the Naval Battle of Campeche.

== Commanders of the Vessel ==
The San Antonio was commanded by:

- Lt. Francis B. Wright, November 1839—January 1840
- Lt. James O'Shaunessy, January—February 1840
- Lt. Alexander Moore, February 1840—June 1841
- Lt. William Seeger, June 1841—October 1842

== See also ==
- Texan schooner Invincible
- Texan schooner Independence
- Texan schooner Brutus
