= Texan schooner San Jacinto =

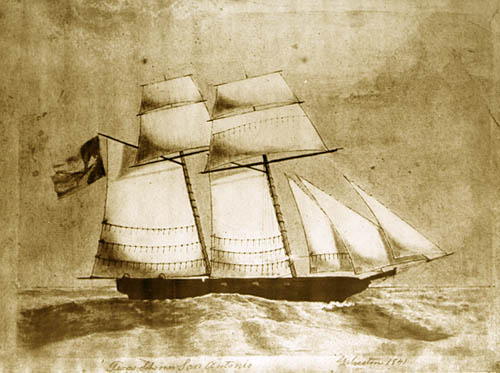
- Schooner San Antonio, San Jacinto's sister ship

History

Republic of Texas
- Namesake: San Jacinto River
- Builder: Schott and Whitney, Baltimore
- Launched: 1836
- Commissioned: 27 June 1839
- Decommissioned: 31 October 1840
- Renamed: Originally called the Viper
- Home port: Galveston, Texas
- Fate: Wrecked in a storm at the Cayos Arcas in 1840

General characteristics
- Class & type: Schooner
- Displacement: 170 tons
- Length: 66 feet
- Beam: 21.5
- Draught: 8 ft.
- Propulsion: wind
- Speed: variable
- Complement: 13 officers; 69 sailors & marines
- Armament: 4–12 lb. med.; 1–9 lb. long

The Texan schooner San Jacinto was a two-masted schooner of the Second Texas Navy from 1839 to 1840. She was the sister ship of the San Antonio and the San Bernard. In 1840, San Jacinto was part of the Texas Navy flotilla led by Commodore Edwin Ward Moore which was dispatched to assist Yucatecan rebels that had taken up arms against Mexico. In a storm, San Jacinto ran aground at Cayos Arcas and was wrecked. The crew were rescued by the flagship Austin.

== Background of the Texas Navy ==
The Texas Navy was officially formed in January 1836, with the purchase of four schooners: Invincible, Brutus, Independence, and Liberty. These ships, under the command of Commodore Charles Hawkins, helped Texas win independence by preventing a Mexican blockade of the Texas coast, seizing Mexican ships carrying reinforcements and supplies to its army, and sending their cargoes to the Texas volunteer army. Nevertheless, Mexico refused to recognize Texas as an independent country. By the middle of 1837, all of the ships had been lost at sea, run aground, captured, or sold. With no ships to impede a possible invasion by Mexico, Texas was vulnerable to attack.

In 1838, President Mirabeau B. Lamar responded to this threat by forming a second Texas Navy. Unlike Sam Houston, Lamar was an ardent supporter of the Texas Navy and saw the urgent need for its continuation. The second Texas Navy was placed under the command of Commodore Edwin Ward Moore, an Alexandria Academy graduate who was recruited from the United States Navy. One of the ships of this second navy was the San Jacinto along with her sister ships, the San Antonio and San Bernard.

== History of the San Jacinto ==
Pennant of the San Jacinto

Originally built as one of the Baltimore clippers at the Schott and Whitney shipyard in Baltimore, Maryland and called Viper, she was one of the smallest of a class of schooners and brigs built specifically for the slave trade between 1820 and 1850. A group of six schooners, including La Amistad was built in Baltimore around 1836. They were identified as being "Purposely built and fitted out for use in the slave trade by the United States Consul General in Havana", and Viper was typical of the class.

=== Blockade duty and wreck ===
On 26 June 1840, the San Jacinto sailed from Galveston with instructions to blockade the Mexican port of Veracruz and seize enemy ships. On 20 August, the San Jacinto rejoined Commodore Edwin W. Moore's flotilla and remained with them until being detached to Galveston with dispatches for the government. In search of drinking water, the San Jacinto called at Cayos Arcas. A violent cold front approached but Lt. O'Shaunessy nevertheless went ashore, leaving Lt. Alfred G. Gray as senior officer on board. When the ship's anchor failed to hold, Gray displayed great ingenuity and seamanship in an attempt to save it, but even a piece of the ship's artillery used as an additional anchor could not save the San Jacinto from being swept ashore by gale winds.

The survivors of The San Jacinto were rescued by the Austin on 31 October 1840 and the ship was declared a loss.

=== Commanders of the vessel ===
The San Jacinto was commanded by:

- Captain John T. K. Lothrop, June—November 1839
- Lt. James E. Gibbons, February—April 1840
- Lt. Alexander Moore, April—May 1840
- Lt. William R. Postell, May—September 1840,
- Lt. James O'Shaunessy, September—31 October 1840.
