= Texan schooner Zavala =

- Zavala

History

United States
- Name: Charleston
- Namesake: Charleston, South Carolina
- Builder: John Vaughan and Son
- Completed: 1836
- Fate: Sold to Texan Navy, November 1838

Republic of Texas
- Name: Zavala
- Namesake: Lorenzo de Zavala
- Acquired: November 1838
- Commissioned: 23 March 1839
- Decommissioned: May 1842
- Home port: Galveston, Texas
- Fate: ran aground, later broken up and sold for scrap

General characteristics
- Type: Schooner
- Length: 201 ft (61 m)
- Beam: 24 ft (7.3 m)
- Draft: 12 ft (3.7 m)
- Propulsion: steam
- Capacity: 120
- Complement: 24 officers; 123 sailors & marines
- Armament: 4-12 lb. med.; 1-9 lb. long

The Texan steamship Zavala was a Texas Navy ship in Texas' second Navy after the Texas Revolution. She was the first steamship-of-war in the Texas Navy.

== Background of the Texas Navy ==
The Texas Navy was officially formed in January 1836, with the purchase of four schooners: Invincible, Brutus, Independence, and Liberty. These ships, under the command of Commodore Charles Hawkins, helped Texas win independence by preventing a Mexican blockade of the Texas coast, seizing Mexican ships carrying reinforcements and supplies to its army, and sending their cargoes to the Texas volunteer army. Nevertheless, Mexico refused to recognize Texas as an independent country. By the middle of 1837, all of the ships had been lost at sea, run aground, captured, or sold. With no ships to impede a possible invasion by Mexico, Texas was vulnerable to attack.

In 1838, President Mirabeau B. Lamar responded to this threat by forming a second Texas Navy. Unlike Sam Houston, Lamar was an ardent supporter of the Texas Navy and saw the urgent need for its continuation. The second Texas Navy was placed under the command of Commodore Edwin Ward Moore, an Alexandria Academy graduate who was recruited from the United States Navy. One of the ships of this second navy was the Zavala.

== History of Zavala ==
Pennant of the Zavala

Zavala was built in 1836 as a passenger steamship named the Charleston serving the Philadelphia-Charleston route. In 1838, when Lamar began rebuilding the Texan fleet, the navy purchased Charleston for $120,000 and renamed it Zavala in honor of Lorenzo de Zavala, the first vice president of the Republic of Texas.

On 10 May 1839, Zavala assisted in the refloating of the French frigate Néréide, which had run aground at Galveston. Captain A. C. Hinton was her first commander in the Texas Navy. Capt. John T. K. Lothrop took command of Zavala on 4 March 1840 and led her on her only campaign. After the successful Texas revolt, other parts of Mexico had rebelled against the regime of Santa Anna, including the Yucatan peninsula. President Lamar was determined to assist the rebels in their struggle with Mexico City. So, on 24 June 1840, Zavala accompanied by Commodore Moore's flagship, the sloop-of-war Austin, and three armed schooners, slipped out of Galveston Bay and turned south across the Gulf to the Bay of Campeche near the Yucatan Peninsula.

During the cruise off the Yucatan, Zavala never engaged the enemy directly, but she proved invaluable in the only action that the flotilla saw. On 20 November 1840, the steamship towed Moore's flagship, Austin and the schooner San Bernard 90 miles (140 km) up the San Juan Bautista River to Villahermosa, the seat of government control in the state of Tabasco. The squadron had made a deal with federalist rebels to drive the centralistas out for $25,000, the first $10,000 to be paid up front. The federalists agreed. Soon the small flotilla pointed their guns at the city and then sent troops into the seemingly deserted capital. Commodore Moore encountered a man bearing a white flag on a tree branch, and when he ascertained that this was the mayor, the Texas commodore demanded $25,000 or he would level the town. The mayor asked if silver would be acceptable, and upon receiving an affirmative reply, delivered the ransom. The commodore set sail with his booty and used the money to repair and outfit his ships.

== Return to Galveston and the end ==
Returning to her homeport in Galveston, Zavala encountered a terrible storm and ran out of coal, forcing the crew to burn anything they could put their hands on to avoid losing her in the storm.

Badly damaged, Zavala was laid up in Galveston harbor awaiting repairs, which due to the state of the Republic's finances were not forthcoming. With the election of Sam Houston in 1841, the navy was no longer a priority and Zavala was allowed to deteriorate. In May 1842, she was in such poor condition that Zavala was eventually scuttled to prevent her sinking.

== The wreck ==
Clive Cussler, founder of the National Underwater and Marine Agency, located the hull of Zavala (archaeological site 41GV95) beneath a parking lot in the former Bean's Wharf area of the harbor in 1986. In Clive Cussler's NUMA Files series of adventure novels, one of the main characters is named Jose 'Joe' Zavala after the ship.
