= Texan schooner San Bernard =

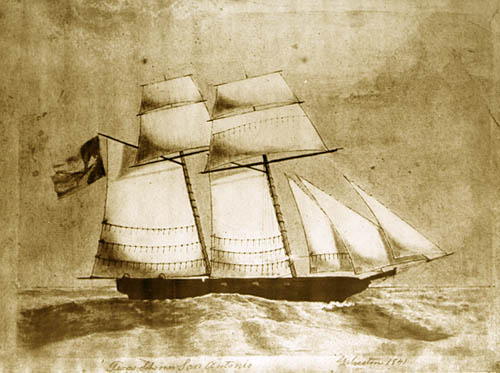
- Schooner San Antonio, sister ship of San Bernard

History

Republic of Texas
- Namesake: San Bernard River
- Builder: Schott and Whitney, Baltimore
- Launched: 1836
- Commissioned: 31 August 1839
- Decommissioned: 11 May 1846
- Renamed: Originally called the Scorpion
- Home port: Galveston, Texas
- Fate: Transferred to the United States Navy upon the annexation of Texas; subsequently sold for $150

General characteristics
- Class & type: Schooner
- Displacement: 170 tons
- Length: 66 feet
- Beam: 21.5
- Draught: 8 ft.
- Propulsion: wind
- Speed: variable
- Complement: 13 officers; 69 sailors & marines
- Armament: 4-12 lb. med.; 1-12 lb. long

The Texan schooner San Bernard was a two-masted schooner of the Second Texas Navy from 1839-1840. She was the sister ship of the San Jacinto and the San Antonio. In 1840, San Antonio was part of the Texas Navy flotilla led by Commodore Edwin Ward Moore which was dispatched to assist Yucatecan rebels that had taken up arms against Mexico. Returning to the Yucatan in 1841, San Bernard assisted in the capture of three Mexican prizes. Upon return to Galveston, San Bernard was driven ashore and was not repaired. When Texas joined the United States in 1846, San Bernard was transferred to the United States Navy and then sold for $150.

== Background of the Texas Navy ==
The Texas Navy was officially formed in January 1836, with the purchase of four schooners: Invincible, Brutus, Independence, and Liberty. These ships, under the command of Commodore Charles Hawkins, helped Texas win independence by preventing a Mexican blockade of the Texas coast, seizing Mexican ships carrying reinforcements and supplies to its army, and sending their cargoes to the Texas volunteer army. Nevertheless, Mexico refused to recognize Texas as an independent country. By the middle of 1837, all of the ships had been lost at sea, run aground, captured, or sold. With no ships to impede a possible invasion by Mexico, Texas was vulnerable to attack.

In 1838, President Mirabeau B. Lamar responded to this threat by forming a second Texas Navy. Unlike Sam Houston, Lamar was an ardent supporter of the Texas Navy and saw the urgent need for its continuation. The second Texas Navy was placed under the command of Commodore Edwin Ward Moore, an Alexandria Academy graduate who was recruited from the United States Navy. One of the ships of this second navy was the San Jacinto along with her sister ships, the San Jacinto and San Bernard.

== History of the San Bernard ==
Pennant of the San Bernard

Originally built as one of the Baltimore clippers at the Schott and Whitney shipyard in Baltimore, Maryland and called Scorpion, she was one of the smallest of a class of schooners and brigs built specifically for the slave trade between 1820 and 1850. A group of six schooners, including La Amistad was built in Baltimore around 1836. They were identified as being "[p]urposely built and fitted out for use in the slave trade by the United States Consul General in Havana", and AScorpion was typical of the class.

=== On patrol and carrying dispatches ===
On 26 June 1840, the San Bernard sailed from Galveston with the rest of the flotilla under the command of Commodore Edwin W. Moore. After a season of patrolling off the Texas coast to intercept smugglers and to engage in surveys and cartography, Lt. Crisp and the San Bernard delivered Texas agent James Webb to Veracruz, arriving on 31 May 1841 but were refused landing rights by port officials. San Bernard remained off the coast of Veracruz until the end of June and then sailed for the Yucatan. While crossing the Bay of Campeche, her topmast was carried away and she was compelled to return to Galveston, reaching port on 20 June 1841.

=== Capturing prizes ===
Joining the flagship Austin and San Antonio, San Bernard set sail again for the Yucatan on 13 December 1841. The flotilla reached Sisal on 6 January 1842, For the next couple of months, she participated in the capture of the Mexican merchant vessels Progreso, Dolorita and the Dos Amigos in April 1842. Off Tampico, Lt. Crisp and San Bernard were ordered back to Galveston to deliver dispatches and reports. San Bernard did not return to Commodore Moore and the rest of the Texas fleet until 24 April 1842.

=== Beached and rotting ===
At the end of this cruise San Bernard returned to Galveston in early September. The ship was badly worm-eaten. Despite authorization to have her repaired in New Orleans, no funds were provided to pay for the work by the Minister of War and Marine. Later that month, the San Bernard was driven ashore by a gale, and lacking the $500 required to refloat her and have her repaired she became a deserted hulk in Galveston harbor.

== Transfer to the U.S. Navy ==
When Texas was annexed by the United States, the San Bernard and Austin were transferred to the United States Navy, on 11 May 1846. When the United States fleet found no place for San Bernard, she was sold for $150.

=== Commanders of the Vessel ===
The San Antonio was commanded by:

- Lt. A.C. Hinton, September—November 1839
- Lt. William R. Postell, November 1839—May 1840
- Lt. William S. Williamson, May 1840—November 1840
- Lt. Thurston W. Taylor, November 1840—January 1841
- Lt. James O'Shaunnesy, January 1841—March 1841
- Lt. Dowling H. Crisp, March 1841—May 1846
