= Texan brig Wharton =

- Brig Wharton

History

Republic of Texas
- Namesake: John Austin Wharton
- Builder: Schott and Whitney, Baltimore
- Launched: 1839
- Commissioned: October 18, 1839
- Decommissioned: May 11, 1846
- Renamed: Originally called the Colorado
- Home port: Galveston, Texas
- Fate: Transferred to the United States Navy and then sold

General characteristics
- Class & type: Brig
- Displacement: 405 tons
- Tons burthen: 419 tons
- Length: 112 ft (34 m)
- Beam: 29 ft (8.8 m)
- Draught: 11 ft (3.4 m)
- Propulsion: wind
- Speed: variable
- Complement: 17 officers; 123 sailors & marines
- Armament: 14-18 lb. med.; 1-9 lb. long

The Texan brig Wharton was a two-masted brig of the Second Texas Navy from 1839 to 1846. She was the sister ship of the Archer. Accompanying the Texas flagship, Austin, she defeated a larger force of Mexican Navy steamships in the Naval Battle of Campeche in May 1843. Transferred to the United States Navy in 1846, she was sold for $55.

== Background of the Texas Navy ==
The Texas Navy was officially formed in January 1836, with the purchase of four schooners: Invincible, Brutus, Independence, and Liberty. These ships, under the command of Commodore Charles Hawkins, helped Texas win independence by preventing a Mexican blockade of the Texas coast, seizing Mexican ships carrying reinforcements and supplies to its army, and sending their cargoes to the Texas volunteer army. Nevertheless, Mexico refused to recognize Texas as an independent country. By the middle of 1837, all of the ships had been lost at sea, run aground, captured, or sold. With no ships to impede a possible invasion by Mexico, Texas was vulnerable to attack.

In 1838, President Mirabeau B. Lamar responded to this threat by forming a second Texas Navy. Unlike Sam Houston, Lamar was an ardent supporter of the Texas Navy and saw the urgent need for its continuation. The second Texas Navy was placed under the command of Commodore Edwin Ward Moore, an Alexandria Academy graduate who was recruited from the United States Navy. One of the ships of this second navy was the Wharton along with her sister ship, the Archer.

== History of the Wharton ==
Pennant of the Wharton

Wharton was built in Baltimore, Maryland, at the Schott and Whitney shipyard. Originally called the Colorado, she was rechristened in honor of John Austin Wharton, a hero of the battle of San Jacinto.

From her commissioning until January 1842, Wharton remained in Galveston awaiting provisions and repairs.

=== Cruises to Campeche ===
Leaving Galveston in January, Wharton reached Commodore Moore's squadron off the Yucatan port of Sisal on April 18, 1842. The Wharton brought word to Commodore Moore that the Republic of Texas had declared a blockade of the Mexican coast, and Wharton remained in Mexican waters to help enforce it until May 1842. Returning to Galveston, the Wharton saw almost her crew quit the service as a result of expiring enlistments and desertions.

In late May 1842, she sailed to New Orleans for much-needed repairs with only nine sailors. After receiving a complete overhaul and recruiting a new crew at New Orleans, the Wharton and Moore's flagship, the Austin set out on April 19, 1843, again for a cruise off the Yucatan coast. They sailed to Campeche and there engaged the Mexican steam frigate Moctezuma on April 30 in the first Naval Battle of Campeche. Although the Austin and the Wharton succeeded in temporarily driving the Mexican fleet from Yucatan waters, the Wharton was struck by a sixty-eight-pound shot; two men were killed and four were wounded when one of her own guns exploded during the two days of fighting. A decisive second engagement with the Mexican fleet on May 16, 1843, resulted in a clear Texan victory. The Austin and the Wharton left Mexican waters on June 25 and arrived at Galveston on July 14, 1843, effectively bringing to an end the active service of the Texas navy, as the ships would never leave port again.

=== Transfer to the U.S. Navy ===
When the United States formally annexed Texas on May 11, 1846, the Wharton was transferred to the United States Navy, which in turn sold the ship to the city of Galveston for fifty-five dollars on November 30, 1846.

== Commanders of the Vessel ==
The Wharton was commanded by:

- Capt. Edwin Ward Moore, November 1839—February 1840
- Commander George W. Wheelwright, February 1840—January 1842
- Lt. John T. K. Lothrop, February 1842—July 1843
