= Texan brig Archer =

- Brig Archer

History

Republic of Texas
- Namesake: Branch Tanner Archer
- Builder: Schott and Whitney, Baltimore
- Launched: April 25, 1840
- Commissioned: 1842
- Decommissioned: May 11, 1846
- Renamed: Originally called the Galveston
- Home port: Galveston, Texas
- Fate: transferred to the United States Navy and then sold

General characteristics
- Class & type: Brig
- Displacement: 405 tons
- Tons burthen: 419 tons
- Length: 112 ft (34 m)
- Beam: 29 ft (8.8 m)
- Draft: 11 ft (3.4 m)
- Propulsion: wind
- Speed: variable
- Complement: 17 officers; 123 sailors & marines
- Armament: 15-18 lb. med.; 1-9 lb. long

The Texan brig Archer was a two-masted brig of the Second Texas Navy from 1842-1846. She was the sister ship of the Wharton. Transferred to the United States Navy in 1846, she was sold for $450.

== History of the Archer ==
Pennant of the Archer

Archer was built in Baltimore, Maryland at the Schott and Whitney shipyard. Originally called the Galveston, she was rechristened in honor of Branch Tanner Archer, a diplomat of the Republic of Texas.

She was the last ship of the Texas Navy to be delivered under a contract with the shipbuilding firm Schott and Whitney. She was constructed in Baltimore and was delivered on April 25, 1840. In response to the raids of Mexican generals Rafael Vásquez and Adrián Woll, she was commissioned in 1842. In April of that year she was sent to New Orleans, Louisiana for refitting and re-arming, most of her guns having been transferred to the Austin and the Wharton. The Archer was never sent to sea on a major cruise.

=== Transfer to the U.S. Navy ===
When the United States formally annexed Texas on May 11, 1846, the Archer was transferred to the United States Navy, which in turn sold the ship for 450 dollars on November 30, 1846.

== Commanders of the Vessel ==
The Archer was commanded by:

- Capt. John Clark, 1840 - 1841
