= Branch T. Archer =

Texian diplomat and politician

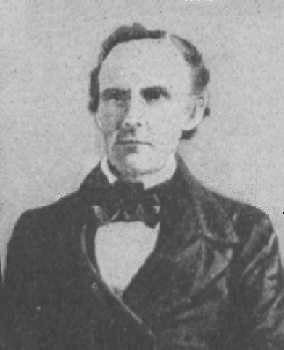

5th Texas Secretary of War
- In office February 1840 – December 13, 1841
- President: Mirabeau B. Lamar
- Preceded by: Albert Sidney Johnson
- Succeeded by: George Washington Hockley

2nd Speaker of the House (Republic of Texas)
- In office 1837–1838
- Preceded by: Ira Ingram
- Succeeded by: Joseph Rowe

Member of the Virginia House of Delegates from the Powhatan County district
- In office 1819–1820
- Preceded by: Colin Clarke
- Succeeded by: Henry W. Watkins

Branch Tanner Archer (December 13, 1790 – September 22, 1856) was a Texan who served as Commissioner to the United States and Speaker of the House of the Republic of Texas House of Representatives and Secretary of War of the Republic of Texas.

== Early life ==
Archer was born in Fauquier County, Virginia on December 13, 1790, to Major Peter Field Archer and Frances Tanner. He attended the College of William and Mary and received his medical degree in 1808 from the University of Pennsylvania. Archer married Eloisa Clarke on January 20, 1813; their union produced six children. Archer practiced medicine and was elected to the Virginia House of Delegates representing Powhatan County from 1819 to 1820. Archer was elected as a presidential elector in the 1820 United States presidential election, casting his vote for Virginia's native son, James Monroe (Democratic-Republican). On May 13, 1828, Archer killed his cousin, Dr. James Ottway Crump, in a duel fought with pistols near Scottsville, Virginia, in Powhatan County.

== In service to Texas ==
Archer arrived in Texas about 1831, residing in Brazoria County. Archer was an active Mason and helped organize a Masonic Lodge in Brazoria. He was also an outspoken advocate of Texas' independence from Mexico and was elected to represent Brazoria at the Convention of 1833. In October 1835, Archer fought at the Battle of Gonzales which ended in a Mexican withdrawal. The next month he was elected Chairman of the Consultation of 1835, meeting in San Felipe de Austin which formed a provisional government for Texas. Although Archer was a hard-liner in favor of independence, he acceded to the will of the majority which voted to support a return to the Mexican Constitution of 1824.

The Consultation subsequently elected Archer, along with Stephen F. Austin and William H. Wharton to serve as Commissioners of Texas in the United States. Their purpose was to raise funds, recruit troops and gain support among Americans for the cause of Texas. The trio sailed from Galveston to New Orleans in late December 1835 and moved up the Mississippi River over the next several weeks making speeches to crowds before moving east to Washington, D.C. While the Commissioners were in Washington, on March 2, 1836, Texas declared its independence from Mexico. The United States refused to recognize the nascent republic at that point.

Archer returned to Texas and was elected to the Texas House of Representatives representing Brazoria. He also supported the election of his former colleague Austin to be President of Texas. In 1837, during the Second Session of the First Congress, Archer was elected Speaker of the Texas House.

While in Congress, Archer joined James Collinsworth in sponsoring legislation to set up the Texas Railroad, Navigation, and Banking Company. Even though President Houston supported the establishment of the company, it later failed primarily due to its banking provisions and because of public opposition led by President Anson Jones.

In 1838–1839, Archer achieved the position of Grand Master of the Grand Lodge of Texas.

During the administration of President Mirabeau B. Lamar, Archer was chosen to serve as Secretary of War from February 1840 until December 13, 1841.

== Final years ==
Archer remained politically active throughout his life. He died on September 22, 1856, at Brazoria and was buried at William H. Wharton's Eagle Island Plantation on Oyster Creek in Brazoria County. Archer City and Archer County, Texas, the brig Archer of the Second Texas Navy were all named in his honor.

Diplomatic posts
Preceded by post created	Texas Commissioner to the United States; 1835 – 1836 served alongside Stephen F. Austin and William H. Wharton	Succeeded by William H. Wharton
Political offices
Preceded by Colin Clarke	Member of the Virginia House of Delegates representing Powhatan County; 1819–1820	Succeeded by Henry W. Watkins
Preceded by Ira Ingram	Speaker of the Republic of Texas House of Representatives; 1837	Succeeded by Joseph Rowe
Preceded by Albert Sidney Johnston	Secretary of War of the Republic of Texas; February 1840 – December 13, 1841	Succeeded by George Washington Hockley
