= Republic of Texas–Yucatán relations =

Texan-Yucatáni relations
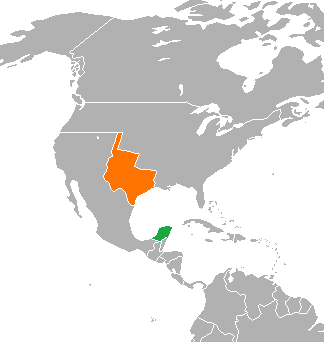

- Yucátan: Texas

Diplomatic mission
- Embassy of Yucatán, Austin: Embassy of Texas, Merida

Texas - Yucatán relations refers to the historical foreign relations between the Republic of Texas and Republic of Yucatán. Relations effectively began in 1841 when Yucatán seceded from Mexico, and ended upon the annexation of Texas by the United States in 1845.

== Secession from Mexico ==
Texas and Yucatán, both territories of Mexico, were resistant to the order of the Mexican government and each decided to secede. The two territories' reasons for secession differed, but nonetheless they shared a common goal of independence. Texas seceded first in 1836, and Yucatán seceded in 1841 with help from Texan naval forces.

== Disputes with Mexico ==
Conflict with Mexico did not end for either republic after independence. The battle on land became minimal but the battle at sea raged on, and the two republics had to strengthen their alliance in order to survive as sovereign nations. The British Empire supplied the Mexican Navy with ironclads, while France supplied Texas and Yucatán with diplomatic support.

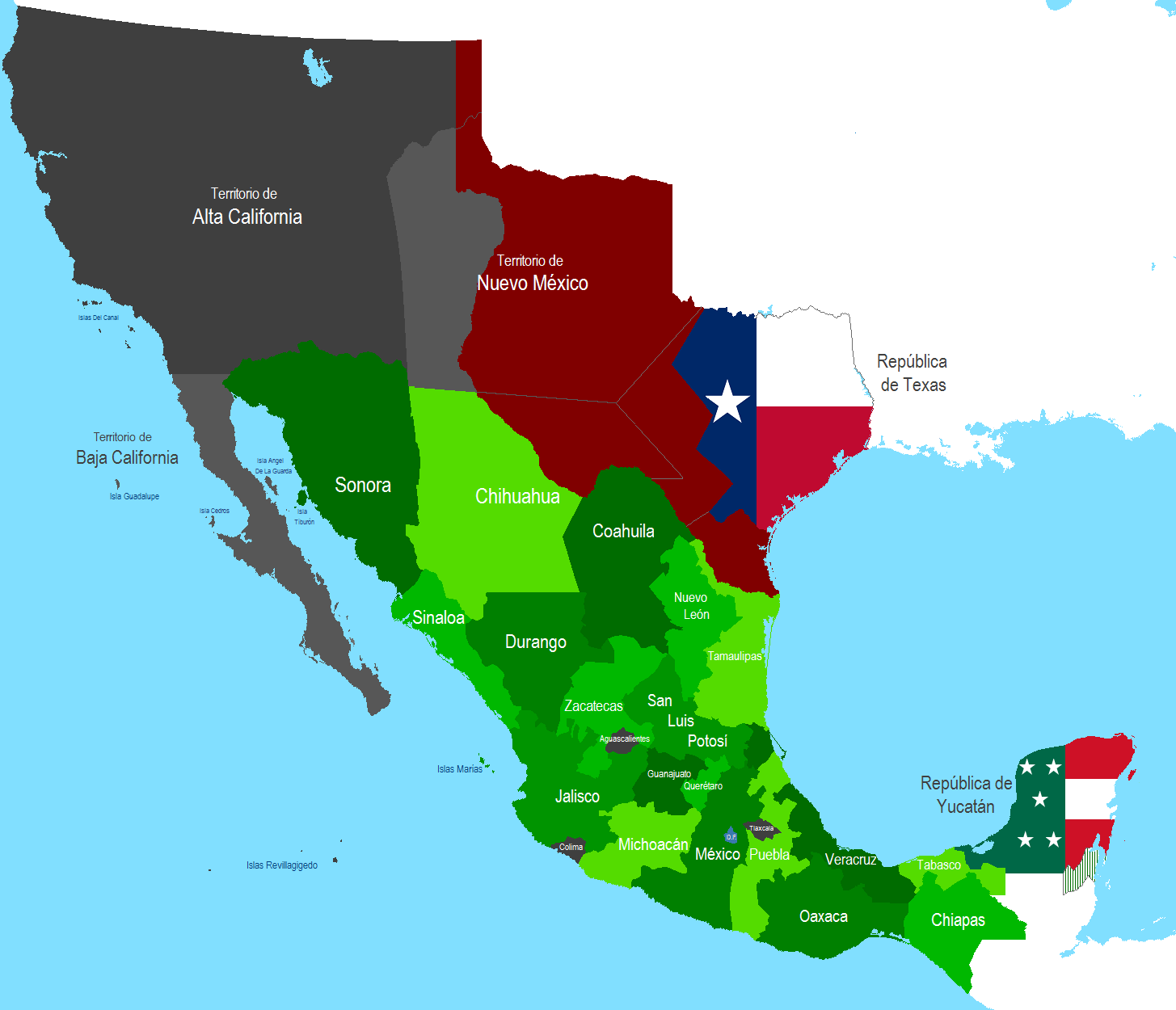
Map of Mexico showing Yucatán and Texas by Flag.

== Diplomatic relations ==
Yucatán had an embassy in Austin, Texas, while Texas had an embassy in Mérida.

== See also ==
- Texas Revolution
- Republic of Yucatan
- Republic of Texas
- Republic of Texas – Mexico relations
- Secession
- Naval Battle of Campeche
