= Naval Battle of Campeche =

Battle

Coordinates: 19°55′N 90°38′W

- Part of Texas-Mexican Wars and Yucatan Rebellion
- The Texan sloop-of-war Austin.
Date	April 30 – May 16, 1843
Location	near Campeche, Mexico
Result	See aftermath

Belligerents
Republic of Texas; Republic of Yucatán	Mexico

Commanders and leaders
(Republic of Texas) Edwin Ward Moore (Republic of Yucatán) James D. Boylan	(Mexico) Tomás Marín

Strength
1 sloop-of-war 1 brig 2 schooners 5 gunboats	3 steamers 2 brigs 2 schooners

Casualties and losses
7 killed 24 wounded	30 killed 55 wounded

The Naval Battle of Campeche took place on April 30, 1843, and May 16, 1843. The battle featured the most advanced warships of its day, including the Mexican steamer Guadalupe and the equally formidable Montezuma which engaged a squadron of vessels from the Second Republic of Yucatán and the Republic of Texas. The latter force consisted of the Texas Navy flagship sloop-of-war Austin, commanded by Commodore Edwin Ward Moore, the brig Wharton, and several schooners and five gunboats from the Republic of Yucatán, commanded by former Texas Navy Captain James D. Boylan.

After the conservative and centralist Centralist Republic of Mexico suspended the 1824 Constitution of Mexico, the Republic of Texas, the Republic of Yucatán, and the Republic of the Rio Grande individually asserted independence. The Republic of the Rio Grande declared independence in early 1840 but was defeated and reunited with Mexico within a year, well before the battle of Campeche. Texas declared its independence in 1836, but Mexico refused to recognize its declaration. The Republic of Yucatán declared independence the same year, and remained in intermittent armed conflict with Mexico from 1836 through 1846. In an attempt to quell the rebellion, Mexico attempted to blockade the Yucatecan port of Campeche. The Battle of Campeche resulted when the allied forces of Texas and Yucatan attempted to lift the blockade. The battle ended indecisively. A scene from this battle is engraved on the cylinder of every Colt 1851 Navy, 1860 Army, and 1861 Navy revolver.

== Background ==
After declaring their independence from the Spanish metropole in 1821, Mexico experienced a period of political and financial instability. In an attempt to address its people's needs and voices, the Provisional Government of Mexico drafted the 1824 Constitution of Mexico. The succeeding First Mexican Republic did not eliminate the political and financial instability, which the Conservative Party blamed on the empowerment of states over the federal government as well as mass participation in the political system through universal male suffrage. After taking power in 1835, the Conservative Party suspended the 1824 Constitution. In response, Texas, Yucatán, and Rio Grande each declared independence over the next few years.

In pre-Republic Mexican Texas, tension had been rising between the Mexican authorities and settlers from the United States over the issues of individual and state rights. Further conflict arose over a ban on immigration that was largely defied by United States settlers, who continued to immigrate to Mexican Texas. By 1834, English-speaking immigrants outnumbered Spanish-speaking Mexicans. After Central Mexican government revoked their autonomy granted by 1824 Constitution of Mexico in 1835, Texians raised a rebellion. Although defeated militarily in the Texas war of independence, resulting in a commitment to self governance in Mexican Texas, the Mexican Congress refused to recognize the independence of the Republic of Texas. The Congress claimed that the agreement was signed by Mexican President General Antonio López de Santa Anna under duress as prisoner of war, and the majority of the Mexican Congress did not approve the agreement. Intermittent conflicts between Mexico and Texas continued into the 1840s.

During the same period, pre-1843, Mexico and the Republic of the Yucatán also engaged in intermittent military conflict.

Commodore Edwin Ward Moore had been waging a campaign against Mexican interests in the Gulf and disrupting commerce, because it was thought the Mexican army was planning an amphibious assault on Texas in order to recapture the province. Moore could only fully refit and rearm his ships by expending his own funds when he put in at New Orleans. The government of Texas refused him more funds and Sam Houston ordered him back to Texas so the fleet could be sold. The fleet, upon being put up for auction in Galveston, was not sold at that time because the citizens of Galveston rioted, thereby preventing the auction. Moore disregarded Houston's orders, and allied himself with the government of the Republic of Yucatan, which was then under siege from the central Mexican government. Yucatan paid Texas $8,000 a month for the services of the Texas Navy. Moore, now fully funded, sailed to lift the Mexican naval blockade of the port of Campeche.

== Battle ==
The brig Wharton depicted on Texan currency.

The battle began on April 30, and involved the Texas-Yucatan force that had been attacking and clearing the Gulf of Mexico of Mexican merchant and fishing boats, against a small Mexican squadron which consisted of sailing ships and a small steamer, the Regenerador. The initial battle lasted a few hours and was a draw, as both sides retired.

After rearming, the Texan ships, including the 600-ton flagship Austin, on May 16 encountered a much stronger Mexican squadron, which included the modern 878-ton iron-hulled (not "ironclad") paddle frigate Guadalupe and the wooden paddle frigate Montezuma, each armed with two 68-pounder Paixhans guns able to fire exploding shells. On board both ships were numerous British sailors, as they were both constructed in England.

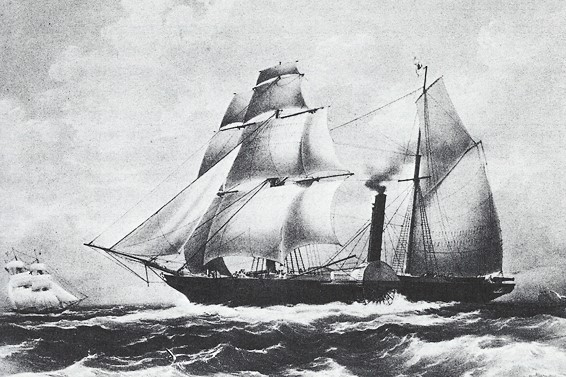
Hand-coloured lithograph of the Mexican 2-gun paddlewheel frigate Guadalupe under steam and sail in a stiff breeze, with vessels to her right and left. Her deck is lined with figures front and aft. One of her two 68-pounder Pivot Guns is visible in her stern. Seagulls effortlessly skim the choppy waves, lending a lively atmosphere to the portrait.

After three hours of broadsides, the battle was essentially a draw, with both sides again withdrawing after sustaining considerable damage and casualties. The Texas ships suffered some physical damage, but the Mexican ships suffered many more casualties of both dead and wounded.

The Mexican steamship Regenerator and its battered attendant squadron rejoined the Guadalupe and the Montezuma flotilla about May 19, and withdrew from the area, and the Texas squadron retired to Galveston.

== Outcome ==
Both engagements resulted in stalemate and ships of both sides received damage. Because the Mexican squadron had to return to friendly port for repair, the naval blockage was lifted.

Texas squadron were acclaimed as heroes on their return, even though Texas President Sam Houston had declared Commodore Moore and the ships' captains and crew pirates for sailing against his wishes. However, after a court martial, Commodore Moore was acquitted of all piracy charges. Having fought an iron-hulled Mexican steamship and 2 other steamers essentially to a draw using only wooden sailing ships was an achievement for Commodore Moore, the Naval Battle of Campeche becoming one of the few, or perhaps only, known naval battle in world history in which sailing ships held their own against steam-powered ships in combat.

The battle proved that one of Mexico's significant tool against Yucatán, naval blockade, could be countered by Yucatán allying with foreign powers. Banking on this ability, Yucatán managed to get concession including full autonomy for their rejoining to Mexico in their negotiation with Mexico on December 5, 1843. Central Mexico soon reneged the agreement and Yucatán seceded again. However, Yucatán suffered conflicts both external, a) with Central Mexico and b) naval blockade by the US Navy in the Mexican–American War, and internal, c) partisanship of their leadership and d) Mayan uprising (called the Caste War). Due to the distressing situation of the Caste War, Yucatán sought economic and military assistance from Mexico. On August 17, 1848, Yucatecan president Miguel Barbachano ordered the resumption of a confederation of Mexico and the restoration of the 1825 Constitution of Yucatán.

== Legacy ==
The battle scene was memorialized by Samuel Colt in an engraving on the cylinder of the famed 1851 and 1861 Colt Navy Revolvers and the Colt 1860 Army Revolver. This was in expression of gratitude to Commodore Moore who in 1837 had purchased Colt Paterson Revolvers for the Republic of Texas Navy. By the time of the Battle of Campeche, however, Colt's enterprise was bankrupt. He would make a comeback in 1847 when under Colonel John C. Hays he was rescued from oblivion and put back to work making guns the Texas Rangers would use in the Mexican War.

== Order of battle ==
Texas Navy:

- Austin, 20 guns, 600-ton sloop-of-war, flagship
- Wharton, 16 guns, brig

Yucatecan Navy:

- Independencia, schooner
- Sisaleno, schooner
- Five gunboats

Mexican Navy:

- Guadalupe, iron hulled paddle frigate, 2 68 pdr. Paixhans guns, 2 32 pdr. 878-ton steamer, flagship
- Montezuma, wooden hulled paddle frigate, 2 68 pdr. Paixhans guns, 6 32 pdr., 1,111-ton steamer
- Regenerator, steamer
- Yucateco, 12 guns, brig
- Iman, 7 guns, brig
- Aguila, 7 guns, schooner
- Campechano, 3 guns, schooner

== See also ==
- Naval operations of the Texas Revolution
- Battle of the Brazos River
- Battle of Matamoros
- Battle of Galveston Harbor (1837)
- Republic of Yucatán
- Republic of Texas
- Centralist Republic of Mexico
