= John Austin Wharton (died 1838) =

Texian statesman and soldier (1806–1838)

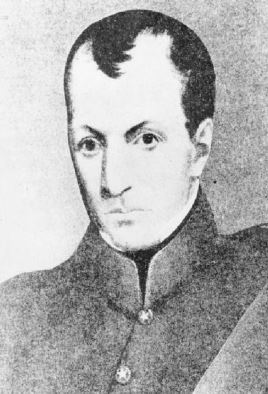

Texas Secretary of War
- In office 1836 – October 1836

Member of the Republic of Texas House of Representatives from Brazoria County
- In office October 3, 1836 – June 13, 1837

Personal details
- Born: April 1806 Nashville, Tennessee, US
- Died: December 17, 1838 (aged 32) Republic of Texas
- Resting place: Founders Memorial Cemetery

Military service
- Allegiance: Republic of Texas
- Branch/service: Texas Army
- Rank: Colonel
- Battles/wars: Texas Revolution; Battle of San Jacinto

John Austin Wharton (April 1806 – December 17, 1838) was a distinguished Texian statesman, lawyer and a soldier. He served as Adjutant General at the Battle of San Jacinto. In a eulogy at his grave, Republic of Texas President David G. Burnet said of him, "The keenest blade on the field of San Jacinto is broken." He died as a bachelor on December 17, 1838, while serving as a member of the Texas Congress. His nephew, John A. Wharton, who would go on to be a Confederate Army general, was named after him.

== Early life ==
John Austin Wharton was born in Nashville, Tennessee, in April 1806. He became an orphan in 1816 and was raised along with his four siblings by his uncle Jesse Wharton who ensured that he received a classical education. His older brother, William H. Wharton preceded him in immigrating to colonial Texas in 1827. John Austin Wharton arrived in Texas between 1829 and 1833.

== In Texas ==
Upon arrival in Texas, Wharton became an agitator for Texas Independence from Mexico. He participated in conventions and consultations which led to Texas declaring independence from Mexico on March 2, 1836. He also formed one of the first Freemason lodges in Texas.

== Hero of San Jacinto ==
Previously, in December 1835, Sam Houston had appointed Wharton as Texas's agent in New Orleans to procure supplies for the coming conflict and was responsible for bringing the cannons known as the "Twin Sisters" to the Texian army. Wharton was later appointed Adjutant General on Houston's staff. Wharton fought bravely during the Battle of San Jacinto, where Mexican strongman Antonio Lopez de Santa Ana was captured. Wharton was recognized by Texas' Secretary of War Thomas Rusk for his service. Wharton also served as Secretary of War of the nascent Republic of Texas in 1836.

== After Texas' independence ==
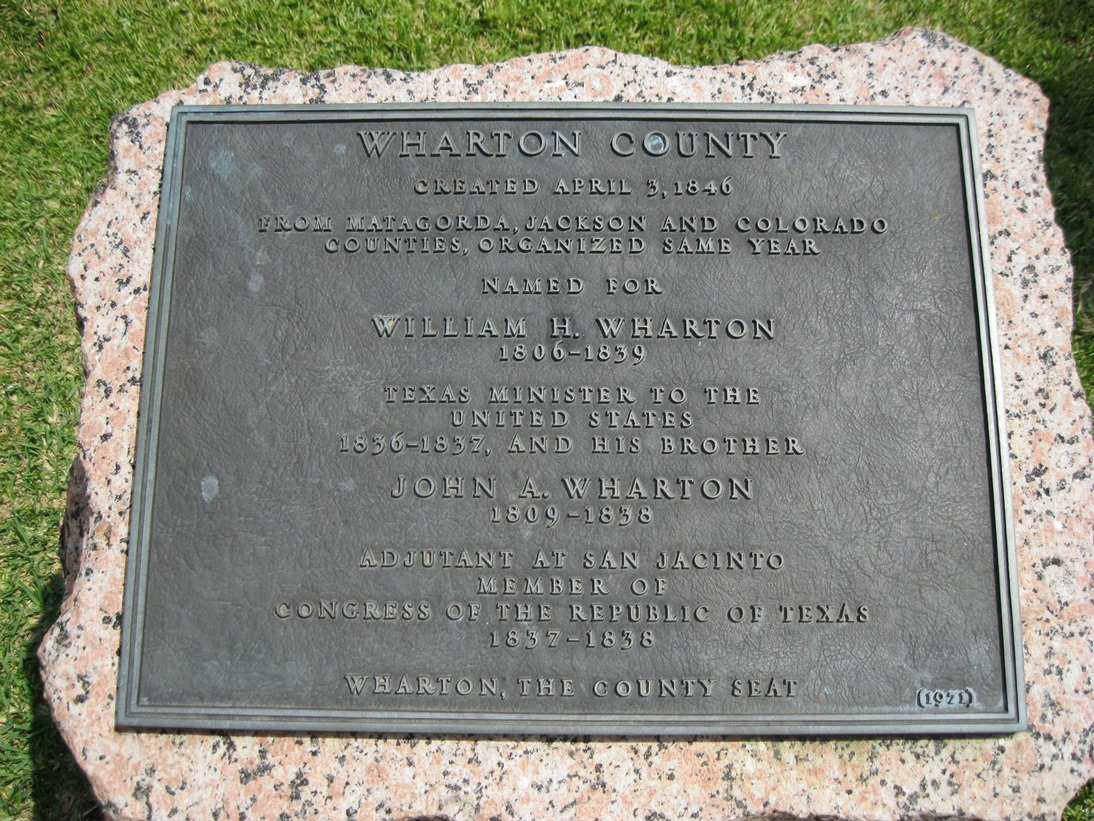
Wharton County, Texas, was named for John A. Wharton and his brother William H. Wharton.

Wharton was elected to the Texas Congress, which was meeting in Houston in 1836 and served until 1837, chairing the Education Committee. During this time, the Texas schooner Independence was busy transporting Texas diplomatic officials, when on April 17, 1837, she was captured by Mexican navy ships. On board was Wharton's brother, William H. Wharton, Texas Minister to the United States, who was imprisoned in Matamoros, Mexico. Wharton attempted to gain the release of his brother and other Texans captured, but he too was imprisoned when he arrived in Mexico. The Wharton brothers eventually escaped and returned to Texas.

Wharton became ill and died on December 17, 1838. He is buried in Founders Memorial Park in Houston. At his funeral, the President of the Republic of Texas provided Wharton's eulogy. In it, he called Wharton, "the keenest blade of San Jacinto."

== Memorials ==
- Wharton County, Texas, is named for the Wharton brothers.
- The Texan brig Wharton was named for John Austin Wharton.

== Sources ==
- Campbell, Randolph B. "Mike" (August 26, 2020). "Wharton, John Austin (1806–1838)". Handbook of Texas Online. Texas State Historical Association.
