= ARM Montezuma =

Mexican naval vessel (1842 - 1846)

History
- Name: Montezuma
- Builder: Green, Wigram's & Green, at Blackwall.
- Completed: 1842
- Acquired: 1842
- Commissioned: 1842
- Decommissioned: 1847
- Maiden voyage: 1842
- In service: 1842
- Out of service: sold to the Spanish Navy in Cuba in 1847
- Renamed: Castilla

General characteristics
- Displacement: 1,080 to 1,111 tons
- Length: 64 m (210 ft)
- Beam: 10.4 m (34 ft)
- Depth: 6.5 ft (2.0 m)
- Installed power: 300 nhp. Made and fitted by Seaward & Capel. 21 strokes per minute.
- Propulsion: wind and steam
- Notes: built for the Mexican Navy.

The Mexican Navy steam paddle frigate Montezuma was part of the Mexican Navy from 1842 to 1847. She participated in the Naval Battle of Campeche in 1843. She was one of the first paddle warships to see action in a naval battle. She was then purchased by the Spanish Navy, renamed Castilla and was their first steam warship to cross the Atlantic Ocean.

== Background of the Mexican Navy ==
The Mexican Navy has its origins in the creation of the Ministry of War in 1821. From that year until 1939 it existed jointly with the Mexican Army in the organic ministry. Since its declaration of independence from Spain in September 1810, through the mid decades of the 19th century, Mexico found itself in a constant state of war, mostly against Spain which had not recognized its independence. Therefore, its priority was to purchase its first fleet from the U.S. in order to displace the last remaining Spanish forces from its coasts.

== Construction of the Montezuma ==
The Montezuma, probably named after Montezuma the last ruler of the Aztec Empire, was built in the Blackwall Yard of London in 1842 as a wooden paddle frigate of around 1,000 tons displacement. Her complement was 6 officers and 75 ratings. It was intended she would mount two 68-pounder guns that fired explosive shells, two 32-pounder guns and four 32 pounder carronades and one 9 pounder gun. Due to diplomatic action in May 1842 by William Kennedy, Republic of Texas consul general in London, and Ashbel Smith, minister to England, she was delivered unarmed as a merchant ship with her guns in her hold. Her first Captain was Commander Richard Francis Cleaveland, of the Royal Navy.

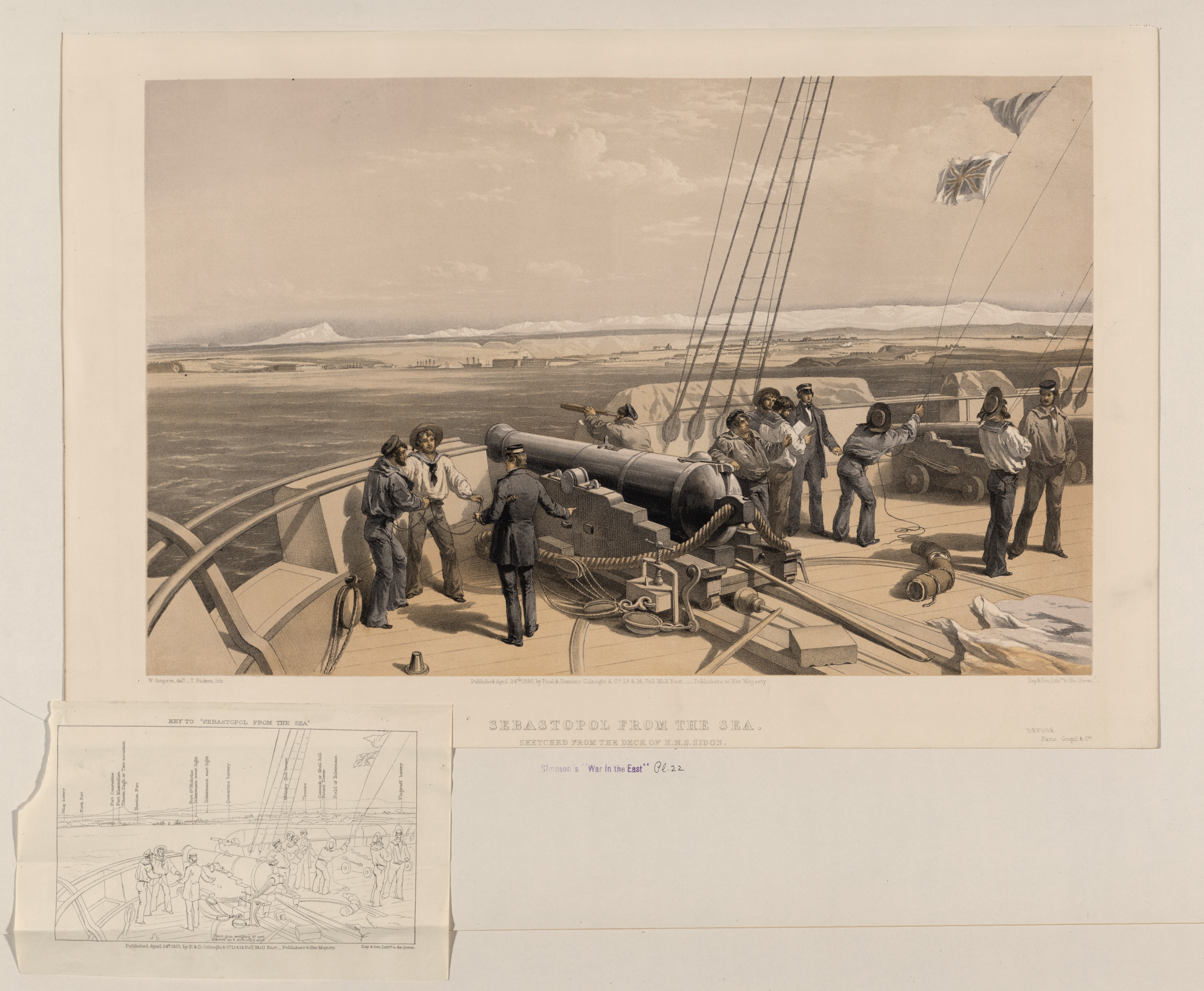
HMS Sidon 68 pounder pivot gun 1855 LOC 05685u

== Career ==
A trial voyage from Blackwall to the Lower Hope and back was made on 28 July 1842. After crossing the Atlantic Ocean on 18 December 1842 she made port at St. Thomas and loaded coal. She then proceeded to Vera Cruz to have her guns fitted and her crew brought up to strength. For her first operation on 20 January 1843 she left Vera Cruz with about 1,500 troops for the Yucatan. After her return she was again despatched to the Yucatan on 21 February 1843 to aid in the siege of the rebels at Campeche. On 1 March 1843. she again arrived at Campeche from Vera Cruz with reinforcements. For her last action before the Naval Battle of Campeche on 14 March 1843 she boarded the schooner ‘Two Sons’, had a glass of wine and left. At Toculxa, near Mexico, a fever was raging and on 29 April 1843 it was reported that Captain Richard Francis Cleaveland and several of the crew, had died, and nearly all the remainder were on the sick list.

=== Naval Battle of Campeche 30 April 1843 and 16 May 1843 ===
The Mexican fleet now possessed the steam frigates Guadalupe and Montezuma. The Texas Navy commander Moore hoped to encounter the Guadalupe separate from her escort Montezuma. Austin and Wharton made for the Yucatán coast and encountered the Mexican squadron on 30 April 1843 between Lerma and Campeche. Montezuma and Guadalupe, along with four smaller vessels, comprised the Mexican fleet. The Texans were augmented by two Yucatecan ships and five small gunboats, but were clearly the smaller fleet. The Mexican shooting at first fell short and then went over the Texas ships. During the two-hour running battle the Austin was struck once in the fighting and lost some of her mizzen rigging and the Guadalupe had 7 dead and the Montezuma 13 dead. After a few hours, the Mexican sailing ships departed and only the two steamers remained. The result was that the Mexican blockade of the port of Campeche was lifted and the Texan ships put into the port for repairs. This first attack was a draw and the fleets separated.

The next event on 16 May 1843 was orchestrated by Commodore Moore and his "Texians" who lured the Mexican Forces into a narrow roadstead, and hounded the Mexican ships away from the harbour firing most of Austin's ammunition as Wharton was not able to engage. The battle toll came out as; "Austin" 3 dead, "Wharton" 2 dead, "Montezuma" 40 dead including her captain and "Guadalupe" 47 dead. The Mexican Fleet was effectively incapacitated. This battle would represent the only time that steam-driven warships would be defeated by sail powered ships. There were numerous falsehoods circulated about Moore's battle with Guadalupe. These seem to be largely the confections of the press, egged on by politicians, and are not to be taken seriously. They include claims to have sunk her.

=== After Campeche ===
On 4 June 1843, it was reported that the Texans caused serious damage to the vessel at the Naval Battle of Campeche. She was overhauled in the U.S. in 1844. On 26 February 1844 she once again sailed from Vera Cruz for Campeche. Next was another Atlantic Ocean crossing and on 15 August 1844 she arrived in Morocco. Next she on 17 August 1844 she sailed from Morocco for Tunis. Finally in August 1846 with Guadalupe she was sold to the Spanish Navy to become their first steam warships and delivered at Havana, Cuba. She was renamed Castilla at this time. She was used under Spanish service as dispatch vessel. In 1847 April she was the first Spanish steam warship to cross the Atlantic. In 1849, the Castilla and León were used with two other Spanish steam ships to intervene in Italy along with French forces during the suppressing of the Roman Republic (1849). The steam ships transported 9,000 troops to Italy and provided logistical support for them for months. The resulting recognition from the Pope, Sardinia, Prussia and Austria strengthened the Spanish government versus its rival Carlist faction.
