= Texan schooner Louisville =

The Texan schooner Louisville was ninety-five-ton schooner that served as a tender in the Texas Navy. The Louisville, which is sometimes referred to as the Striped Pig, was purchased for $4,000 on September 25, 1839 by the Republic of Texas navy agent William Thomas Brannum. When acquired, the Louisville came complete with sails, rigging, and seven water casks.
