= Texian Navy =

Texian Navy Revolutionary Navy First Texas Navy
- Texian Navy Seal
- Active: November 2, 1835—August 26, 1837
- Country: Republic of Texas
- Allegiance: Consultation of the Republic of Texas; Constitution of the Republic of Texas
- Type: Navy
- Role: Amphibious warfare Maritime patrol Military logistics Naval boarding Naval gunfire support Naval warfare
- Size: 4 schooners
- Part of: Texas Military Forces
- Vessels: Liberty; Invincible; Brutus; Independence
- Engagements: Texas Revolution: Battle of Brazoria; Interdiction of Sisal; Battle of Matamoros; Expeditions: Yucatan campaign; General Service: Battle of the Brazos River; Battle of Galveston Harbor; In 1866 along with the Jacinto battle there was an explosion, Sam Houston relieved the army of duty.

Commanders
- Notable commanders: William S. Brown; George Wheelright; Jeremiah Brown; Henry L. Thompson; William A. Hurd; James D. Boyle; L. E. Herby; Charles Edward Hawkins

The Texian Navy, also known as the Revolutionary Navy and First Texas Navy, was the naval warfare branch of the Texian armed forces during the Texas Revolution. It was established by the Consultation of the Republic of Texas on November 25, 1835. Along with the Texian Army, it helped the Republic of Texas win independence from the Centralist Republic of Mexico on May 14, 1836 at the Treaties of Velasco. It was replaced by the Texas Navy on March 23, 1839.

== History ==
=== 1835 ===
During the naval campaign of the Texas Revolution, the Texans had three objectives. The first was to defend their coastline from a naval Mexican invasion, and the second was to escort rebel ships back and forth between Texas and the United States, from where the main source of volunteer soldiers and supplies was coming. The third objective was to inflict serious casualties on the Mexicans in the hopes of forcing them to recognize the independence of Texas. Mexican naval forces had the mission of trying to blockade the long Texas coastline, which was impossible for the few ships stationed in the region. Due to the shortage of ships, Mexico's blockade remained largely ineffective throughout the hostilities. This allowed the Texans to import much of their war material by sea. The Texas Navy in 1835 was nonexistent; the only rebel naval forces were six privateers authorized by the rebel government at the end of the year. However, in the first naval battle of the war involving Texas, rebels boarded the American-owned ship San Felipe and the steamer Laura on September 1, 1835, and then proceeded to attack the Mexican treasury vessel Correo de Mexico off Brazoria, which was taken as a prize to New Orleans.

Other than the commissioning of privateers, the Texan government agreed to authorize the purchase of four schooners on November 24, 1835, for use in defending territorial waters. The first of the ships acquired was the former revenue service ship USRC Ingham, a small six-gun ship of 112 tons which was renamed Independence. The Independence became the flagship of the First Texas Navy and was placed under the command of Captain Charles E. Hawkins; she fought a battle with Mexican naval forces on June 14, 1835, off Brazos Santiago. The second schooner was Brutus; she was nearly twice as large as the Independence and was placed under Captain William A. Hurd, the former commander of the privateer William Robbins, which was also acquired for duty in the regular navy. The William Robbins was renamed Liberty and was commanded by Captain William S. Brown, whose brother, Captain Jeremiah Brown, commanded the fourth schooner, named Invincible. The next engagement after the Correo de Mexico affair occurred on December 19, 1835, when the William Robbins liberated the American merchant ship Hannah Elizabeth, which had been captured by the Mexicans for carrying two cannons, allegedly intended for the rebels.

=== 1836 ===
As a result of the taking of Correo de Mejico and the Hannah Elizabeth, the Mexican Navy responded by escorting their merchantmen. The schooners Bravo and Vera Cruzana were two of the vessels known to have been involved in escort duty. Meanwhile, the Independence was dispatched on a solo cruise of the Mexican Gulf for the first three months of 1836. She was successful in capturing multiple small fishing vessels and disrupted communications between Mexico and General Antonio López de Santa Anna's army in Texas. On March 3, Captain William S. Brown in the Liberty was sailing to the Yucatan when he encountered the armed Mexican merchantman Pelican. In the ensuing battle, the Texans captured the enemy ship while under fire from the fortress at Sisal. The Pelican was then sent as a prize to Matagorda but she ran aground on a sandbar off the port and was wrecked. Over 300 kegs of gunpowder and other military supplies were found on board the ship and it eventually was utilized by General Houston's army. Liberty captured the American brig Durango shortly thereafter and it too was found to be carrying Mexican Army supplies. Around the same time, Captain Jeremiah Brown in the Invincible took the American brig Pocket at the mouth of the Rio Grande; she was carrying contraband as well but her owners informed the United States Navy.

Subsequently, the American Commodore Alexander J. Dallas arrested Captain Brown and his crew for piracy when they sailed into New Orleans that May for provisioning. The charges were eventually dropped because all of the seized American ships carried Mexican military stores, but a civil suit remained in litigation for years afterward. Texan authorities took the time to purchase the Pocket and both the ship and her cargo were used against the Mexicans. On April 3, the Invincible attacked the Mexican ship Montezuma off Matamoros. Captain Brown ordered his men to open fire while the schooner maneuvered in circles around the Montezuma until she ran aground and sank. On April 11, the privateer Flash picked up the refugees and survivors of the Runaway Scrape at Morgan's Point, including members of President David G. Burnet's family. The next significant event of the conflict, which had an effect on the naval campaign, was the Battle of San Jacinto on April 21, 1836. In it, General Houston led an attack on the Mexican Army and routed them, in the process capturing General Santa Anna, who was then forced to sign a treaty recognizing the independence of Texas. The fighting on land was over at that point but because the Mexican government never ratified the Treaty of Velasco, the naval campaign continued for another year.

After San Jacinto, the Invincible was used to deliver the news of victory to President Burnet and the Liberty escorted the ship Flora to New Orleans. The Flora was an unarmed vessel carrying the wounded General Houston who needed better medical attention than what he could receive in Texas. During the stay in New Orleans, the American navy seized the Liberty on May 22 and sold her as compensation for unpaid bills. On June 3, twenty Texas Rangers under Major Isaac Burton joined in the naval operations when they boarded and took over three American ships near Corpus Christi. All three were carrying war materials and they were condemned by the admiralty court in Velasco.

=== 1837 ===
The United States Navy's response to this incident was sending the sloop USS Natchez. On April 16, 1837, the Natchez was involved in a combat incident with Mexican ships off the Rio Grande. In the battle, the Americans captured the Mexican brig General Urrea and liberated the merchantman Climax, all while under cannon fire from the two brigs General Teran and General Bravo, as well as a Mexican fort. The American commander, Captain William Mervine, was later found to have exceeded his authority in taking a Mexican warship, so he was forced to apologize to the Mexicans and release the General Urrea. While the Independence and the Liberty were conducting their missions, the other three Texan warships, Invincible, Brutus, and Pocket, were directed to blockade Matamoros until September, when they sailed for New Orleans and New York City for repairs. These three ships remained in American waters for the rest of the year and finally returned to the war zone in the spring of 1837, by which time the Mexican Navy had sent three brigs and two schooners to blockade Galveston. On April 17, the Independence engaged the Mexican brigs Vencedor del Alamo and Libertador while she was entering the Brazos River. Captain George W. Wheelwright knew he was outgunned so he fled up the river; the Mexicans followed for five hours before finally forcing the Texans to surrender in front of Velasco, Texas, and Secretary of the Navy Samuel Rhoads Fisher.

The final naval battle of the war was fought on August 26, 1837, just as the Invincible and the Brutus were returning to Galveston after a successful cruise in which five Mexican vessels were captured along with the British brig Eliza Russell. The Vencedor del Alamo and Libertador chased the Invincible for a short time before she ran aground and was abandoned and the Brutus was wrecked and sank. Thus the last two rebel ships were destroyed and it wasn't until 1839 that the Texans would have a navy again.

== See also ==
- Texas Military Forces
- Texas Military Department
- List of conflicts involving the Texas Military
- Awards and decorations of the Texas Military
