= George Washington Hockley =

Texas Secretary of War and Marine
- In office 1841–1842
- President: Sam Houston
- Preceded by: Branch T. Archer (War); Louis P. Cooke (Navy)
- Succeeded by: George Washington Hill

Texas Secretary of War (Acting)
- In office 1838–1838
- President: Sam Houston
- Preceded by: Barnard E. Bee Sr.
- Succeeded by: Albert Sidney Johnston

George Washington Hockley (1802 – June 6, 1854) was a Texas revolutionary who served as secretary of war for the Republic of Texas.

Hockley was born in Philadelphia, Pennsylvania. His parents were Thomas Hockley (1764-1805), a Philadelphia merchant, and his wife Mary Wescott (1764-1848). In the above-mentioned recollections of Mr. Howard, he states that then-Major Hockley was an executor of his aunt Patience Wescott of Philadelphia; she had owned 32,500 acres of land in Tipton County, Tennessee.

Hockley, serving in the Texas Army as a colonel, was in charge of the Twin Sisters at the decisive Battle of San Jacinto.

He was the secretary of war for the Republic of Texas during the first and second administrations of the new President Sam Houston. He served briefly in 1838 and again from 1841 to 1842.

In 1843, Houston selected Hockley to serve as a military representative of a Texas diplomatic mission to Mexico. He met with Adrian Woll's delegation at Sabinas, Mexico, where they discussed an amnesty offered by Antonio de Santa Anna to Texas, and proposed a withdrawal of Mexican troops from the Nueces Strip. Hockley and his colleague, Samuel May Williams, remained in Sabinas for six months. Although no agreement from these talks was legalized, they were successful in postponing the threat of a Mexican invasion for another year while Texas negotiated with the United States and Great Britain for protection through official recognition or annexation.

Hockley died on June 6, 1851, in Corpus Christi, Texas, and is interred at the city's Old Bayview Cemetery. In 1936, the year of the Texas Centennial, the state erected a monument in his honor.

Hockley County, Texas, was named in his honor.

He founded the town of Hockley, Texas, in 1835.

== In popular culture ==
- In season 7 of Fear the Walking Dead, Victor Strand arms himself with a cutlass that had originally belonged to George Washington Hockley, telling Will in "The Beacon" that it dates back to the War of 1812. Strand briefly uses the sword in season 8 as well before it's stolen from him.
