= Battle of Galveston Harbor (1837) =

1837 naval battle between Mexico and the Republic of Texas

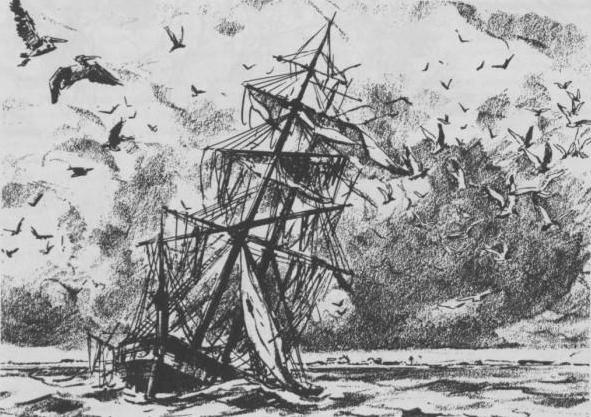
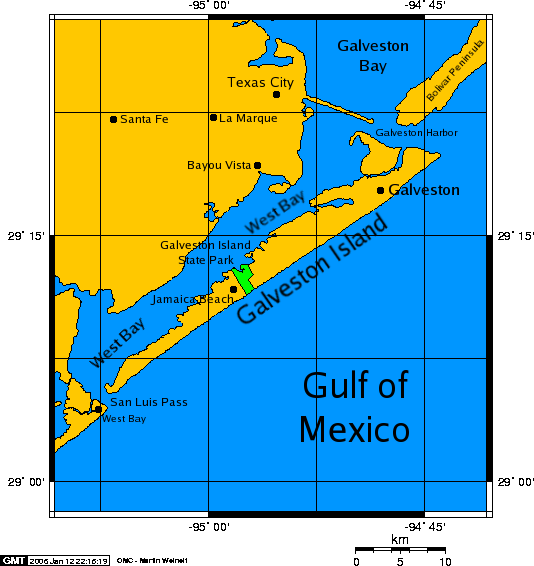
| Date | August 26, 1837 |
| Location | off Galveston, Texas |
| Result | Mexican victory: End of the First Texas Navy |

Belligerents
| Mexico | Republic of Texas |

Commanders and leaders
| Unknown | (Republic of Texas) Henry L. Thompson |

Strength
| 2 brigs | 2 schooners |

Casualties and losses
| 1 brig damaged | 1 schooner sunk 1 schooner grounded |

The Battle of Galveston Harbor, or the Battle of Galveston Bay was a naval engagement between the Republic of Texas and Mexico in Galveston Harbor on August 26, 1837. After the end of the Texas Revolution in 1836, Mexico and the newly declared Republic of Texas sporadically fought at sea. Texas was hoping to gain independence, while Mexico was hoping to reassert control over Texas.

== Battle ==
On August 26, 1837, Texas Navy ship Invincible, commanded by Commodore Henry L. Thompson, escorted Brutus into Galveston harbor. Brutus had a Mexican prize vessel, Obispo, in tow. Invincible anchored in the channel overnight and the next day she was assailed by the brigs Vencedor del Alamo and Libertador. Brutus cleared for action and attempted to assist Invincible but she ran aground on a sandbar at the entrance to the harbor, leaving Invincible to engage the two Mexican warships alone. The two Mexican craft attempted to board the Texan vessel several times but were forced to break off their close-quarters actions because of Invincible's maneuverability. After a prolonged engagement, the Invincible attempted to flee from the battle, but due to the shallow tide, she snagged her rudder on the harbor bar and ran aground. Invincible was then pounded to pieces by the breakers until her hull completely disappeared in the next 48 hours.

== Aftermath ==
With the wreck of the schooners Invincible and Brutus, the First Texas Navy was at an end. The Texas government then began to procure new vessels for a second Texas Navy. The wreck site of one of the participating ships may have been discovered in 1995 by the National Undersea Marine Agency, though the leader of the project thinks the remains of the shipwreck were widely broadcast by subsequent hurricanes and buried in sand.
