= Texas Navy =

Naval warfare branch of the Republic of Texas

Texas Navy Navy of the Republic of Texas Second Texas Navy
- Texas Navy Seal
- Active: 23 March 1839 – 19 February 1846
- Country: Republic of Texas
- Allegiance: Constitution of the Republic of Texas
- Type: Navy
- Role: Naval warfare, logistics
- Size: 4 schooners, 3 brigs, 1 steamship, 1 sloop-of-war
- Part of: Texas Military Department: Texas Military Forces
- Colors: Red, white, and blue
- Vessels: Potomac; Zavala; San Jacinto; San Antonio; San Bernard; Wharton; Austin; Archer; Louisville
- Engagements: Yucatan campaign: Battle of Campeche

Commanders
- Notable commanders: Edwin Ward Moore; Charles Edward Hawkins; A.C. Hinton; J. T. K. Lothrop; W. R. Postell; J. O’Shaunessy; Alexander Moore; William Seeger; W. S. Williamson; T. A. Taylor; D. H. Crisp; George Wheelright; J. Clark

The Texas Navy, officially the Navy of the Republic of Texas, also known as the Second Texas Navy, was the naval warfare branch of the Texas Military Forces during the Republic of Texas. It descended from the Texian Navy, which was established in November 1835 to fight for independence from Centralist Republic of Mexico in the Texas Revolution. The Texas Navy, Texas Army, and Texas Militia were officially established on September 5, 1836 in Article II of the Constitution of the Republic of Texas. The Texas Navy and Texas Army were merged with the United States Armed Forces on February 19, 1846 after the Republic of Texas became the 28th state of the United States.

== Background ==
The Texas Navy descended from the Texian Navy, which was established by the Consultation of the Republic of Texas on 25 November 1835 to aid the fight for independence from the Centralist Republic of Mexico in the Texas Revolution. It consisted of four schooners: Liberty, Independence, Invincible, and Brutus. Liberty was sold in June 1836. Independence was captured during the Battle of the Brazos River in April 1837. Invincible and Brutus were run aground at the Battle of Galveston Harbor in August 1837.

Texian Navy schooners Liberty, Independence, Invincible and Brutus

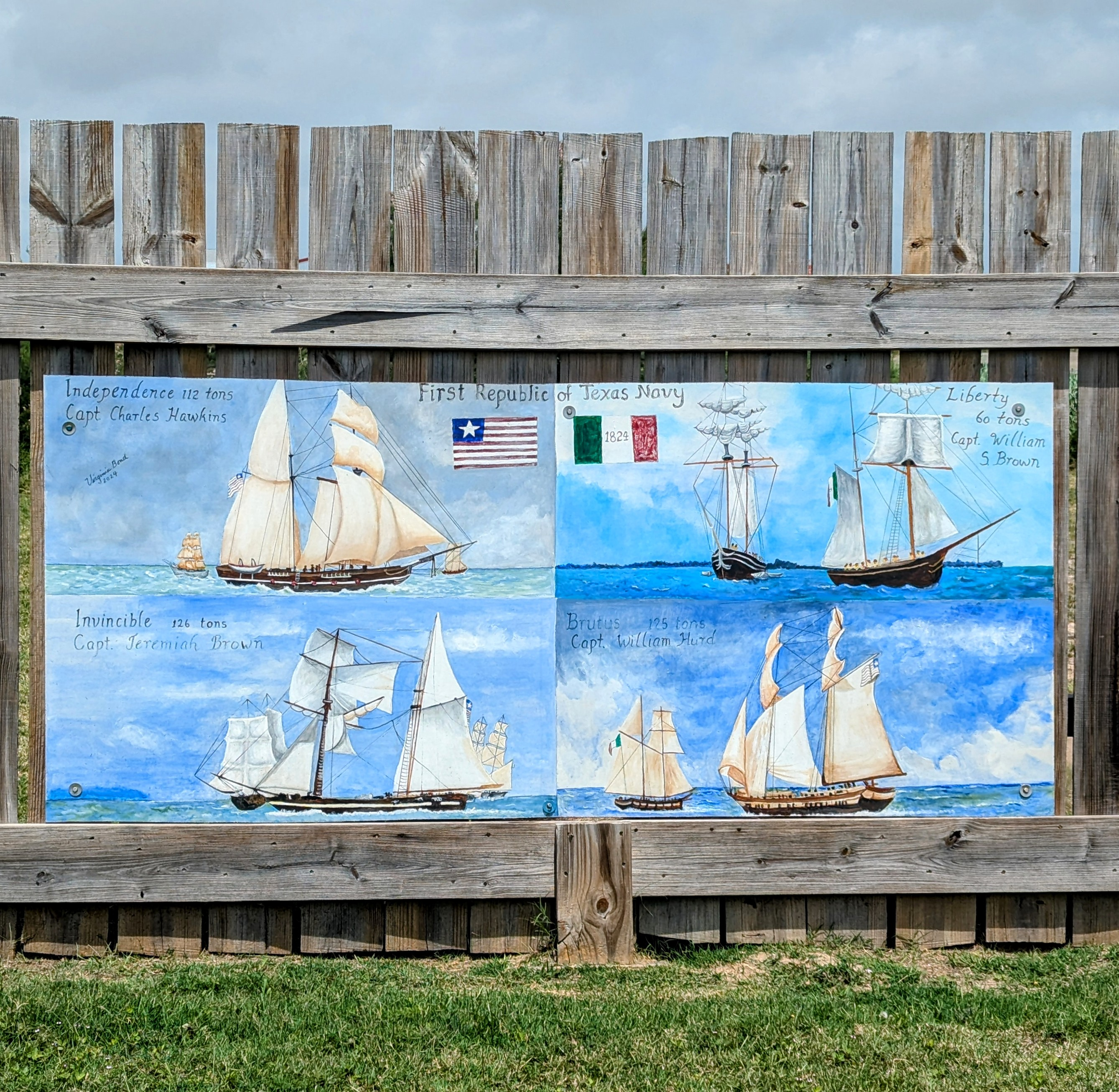
Texian Navy schooners

== History ==
The first ensign of the Republic of Texas adopted via executive order issued by President David G. Burnet on 9 April 1836

In October 1836, the Congress of the Republic of Texas passed an appropriation bill for $135,000 to expand the then Texian Navy with four additional ships. The bill was signed by President Sam Houston, but no action was taken. Following the losses of Invincible and Brutus at the Battle of Galveston Harbor, another bill was passed on 4 November 1837 of $280,000 for six ships. Samuel M. Williams was appointed commissioner of their development and awarded the contract to Frederick Dawson of Baltimore in November 1838. Williams also acquired the steam packet Charleston that November. It was renamed Zavala in honor of Lorenzo de Zavala, fitted-out, and recommissioned on 23 March 1839, officially establishing the Texas Navy.

The Texas Navy was commanded by Commodore Edwin Moore, a former lieutenant of the United States Navy. For three years the Texas Navy raided the Mexican coast and kept the Mexican fleet focused on defending its own coastline.

=== Battle of Campeche ===
In the Naval Battle of Campeche on 16 May 1843 the Texas Navy sloop-of-war Austin and brig Wharton, supported by ships from the rebellious Mexican State of Yucatan (then the Republic of Yucatán), engaged Mexican naval vessels, including the steamships Montezuma and Guadalupe. This battle is believed to be unique, marking the only occasion in which a sailing warship engaged and fought a steam-powered warship to a draw. The battle, which raged over several days, was a tactical draw, but a strategic victory for the Texan Navy, which forced the Mexicans to lift their blockade of Campeche and assured security in the meantime for the rebels in Yucatan. Other ships of the Texas Navy at the time included the brigs Potomac and Archer, the schooners San Jacinto, San Antonio and the San Bernard, and the Zavala, the first steamship-of-war in North America.

=== Disbandment ===
When Texas joined the United States in 1846, the Texas Navy was merged into the United States Navy.

== Texas Marines ==
The Texas Marines, officially the Marine Corps of the Republic of Texas, were the naval infantry of the Texas Navy tasked with enforcing discipline aboard ships, providing security at shore stations, sharpshooting, and naval boarding. It was officially established on 14 January 1836 and modeled after the United States Marine Corps.

== Land grant dispute ==
=== Background ===
Land promised in advance of military service is called a bounty, which is a military tradition dating back beyond the Roman Empire, and was a well-established tradition in American military history prior to hostilities in Texas during the revolution. The founders of the Republic of Texas attempted to bolster recruitment into the armed forces through the generous inducement of land for military service. The policy in Texas was inconsistent, as not all Texas veterans were treated equally. Veterans of the Texas Navy, due to political rivalries, were excluded from taking part in the land-granting policies, or "unnecessary extravagance", as it was explained by President Sam Houston at the time of his veto. Texas passed its first bounty act on 24 November 1835, when the general council created a regular army and promised those who served in it for two years 640 acres (2.6 km^{2}) of land. After the revolution, the Texas government distributed the public lands, especially to veterans. In all, 9,874,262 acres (39,959.72 km^{2}) was granted to veterans of the Texas army, or to Confederate soldiers in Texas. Not one of those nearly 10 million acres (40,000 km^{2}) was granted for naval service, despite the importance of naval actions in the Gulf during the revolution. "The fact remains that Texas could not have won her independence and maintained it as she did, without the navy," said Texas Navy historian Alex Dienst. It has been said that if the United States was Texas's biological parent, then shipping lanes from New Orleans were the umbilical cord that kept the rebellion alive during its embryonic months. Historians point out that the Texas Navy was of vital importance to the war effort with approximately three-fourths of all troops, supplies and cash originating from the ports of New Orleans. It was seen as nearly impossible for commerce to go through any other channels into Texas other than by ship due to the impractical nature of crossing Louisiana swamplands, and the "Big Thicket" of East Texas. Navy vessels protected against marauding Mexican warships looking to cut the cord that flowed to Texas through Galveston, keeping the fledgling war effort, and eventually the Republic, alive. Additionally, military leaders knew the importance of the Texas coast to winning a revolution, or quashing a rebellion. In fact, Mexican General Vicente Filisola remarked, "...the posts of Texas are not sustainable, whilst a maritime force does not co-operate with the operations of the land service." On the other side, Commander James Fannin, in an August 1835 letter, wrote that provisions were scarce for the Mexican army on dry land. He requested naval assistance to the army, asking: "Where is your navy?" He pointed out that if Texas ships could block access to ports, "they [the Mexicans] are ruined."

=== Dispute ===
Despite the importance of the Texas Navy to the Texas Revolution, politics got in the way of rewarding Navy veterans with bounty land grants when President Sam Houston, against legislative support, denied land grants to navy veterans in 1842. The battle for bounty lands was a political struggle that culminated six years after the revolution, but had roots that stretched back to 1835. Naval policy was another in a long line of differing views between Sam Houston and Mirabeau Lamar. Lamar preferred an aggressive naval policy that encouraged raids around the Gulf of Mexico to intimidate the enemy. Houston, on the other hand, preferred a more acquiescent naval policy that encouraged ships to stay close to shore, protecting ports for industry and commerce. These disagreements led to inconsistent policies during the Republic era, as Lamar and Houston traded the presidency back and forth. Robert Potter, a Senator, and the one-time Secretary of the Navy, and Senator James Webb proposed a resolution that would allow bounty land to be granted to navy veterans on 4 November 1841. It was noted on the 18 November 1841 edition of the San Augustine Red-Lander that this "Resolution will meet with much opposition in both Houses, and a warm discussion is expected." After the resolution was passed, it was presented to President Sam Houston, who vetoed the bill on 6 January 1842. In Houston's veto message, the President paid tribute to the "exalted Gallantry and distinguished bravery" of the men who went to sea on behalf of the Republic, but he would "not sanction injudicious and unnecessary extravagance" on their behalf. Houston went on to say, "Generally, the seaman has no interest (except a transitory one) on shore." He explained that a people who made their living at sea would pay no attention to improving land granted to them. He believed that to give a land grant to a navy veteran would not benefit the country to any degree, explaining that, "The harpies that are generally found in sea-ports, and to whom seamen usually become indebted, are those only who would profit by the bounty and munificence of the Government." Houston further explained that it was traditional that the sailor receives his pay, and also receives prize money for capturing enemy vessels. "The sailor has his bounty and prize money as incentives to enlistment and continuance in the service; none expect more," he said. "If moreover, a fleet be in the vicinity of a land army, its co-operation is always supposed, and it accordingly participates in the spoils of victory. If, on the other hand, the victory be achieved by the fleet, the reverse is the case; the Naval corps alone enjoy the entire reward of success." Houston also claimed that "the sailors who would have claims are either dead or scattered to the winds of heaven." However, army veterans and their heirs were eligible to receive bounty land whether they lived or died. Houston continued, "If bounty land were granted, the few who survived would deem it valueless, because not one of them would be willing to penetrate the wilderness in quest of a place to locate it, some hundreds of miles beyond the frontiers; and rather than make the attempt, they would be willing to sell it for a trifle." Infuriated by the complete disdain that the "Navy hating" President of the Republic had shown, Robert Potter re-introduced a joint resolution on 25 January 1842 that would hopefully pass over the President's veto, authorizing the Secretary of War and Navy to issue certificates of bounty land to the officers, seamen, and marines of the Navy. Despite Potter's reputation as a good steward of public land and his continual support of the navy, his arguments fell upon deaf ears as he continued to push the issue, to no success. The issue was tabled as President Houston ran out the clock on the bounty land for navy veterans' bill, and the issue would never be broached again.

== Insignia ==
Texas Navy Commodore and Captain Insignia

Texas Navy Commander Collar Insignia

Texas Navy Captain Cuff & Pocket Insignia

Texas Navy Chief Engineer Insignia

Texas Navy Lieutenant Collar Insignia

Texas Navy Lieutenant Cuff Insignia

Texas Navy Purser Insignia

Texas Navy Surgeon Insignia

Texas Navy Midshipman Collar Insignia

Texas Navy Passed Midshipman Insignia

Texas Navy Gunner Insignia

Texas Navy Boatswain Insignia

Texas Navy Carpenter Insignia

Texas Navy Sail Maker Insignia

Texas Navy Sailing Master Insignia

== Other naval forces ==
=== Texas Marine Department ===
The Texas Marine Department was a branch of the Confederate States War Department that operated in Galveston during the American Civil War. It was not a component of the Texas Military Forces, nor did it operate under the Texas Military Department chain of command. It is similar to the United States Army Department of Texas

=== First Naval Battalion ===
In the aftermath of World War II, which saw 24 Nazi U-boats attack 70 ships in the Battle of the Gulf of Mexico, sinking 56 of them, the Adjutant General of Texas Major General Kearie Lee Berry reestablished Texas naval forces to "provide well-trained coastal and inland patrols." The initiative was authorized by the Commander-in-Chief of Texas Military Forces, Governor Beauford H. Jester, and the First Naval Battalion of the Texas State Guard was officially established on 31 October 1948. Its first and ultimately only vessel was the Sumoria, a 60-foot diesel-powered yacht commanded by Sterling Hogan.

=== Third Texas Navy ===
In the midst of the final battle of the Texas tideland dispute with the United States, "the most serious conflict of the century between the states and the federal government", the Commander-in-Chief of Texas Military Forces, Governor Price Daniel, reestablished the Texas Navy in 1958 as an additional effort of inciting public sentiment for Texas naval interests.

He declared the "memory and heritage of the Texas Navy can be preserved best by Texas citizens who are willing to continue by every lawful means the defense of the rights and boundaries of the State." It is often referred to as the Third Texas Navy and was theoretically akin to the United States Merchant Marine. However, it did not fall under the Texas Military Department chain of command, nor have an operational charter. It primarily served as a social and ceremonial club to commemorate the history of the Texian Navy and Second Texas Navy. It was headquartered at Houston Yacht Club and held annual Admiral Balls where the governor would review the fleet at the San Jacinto Monument. The fleet primarily consisted of civilian vessels from its members with the USS Texas serving as flagship. Officers were selected on their merits and commissioned by the Governor as Admirals in the Texas Navy.

The ceremonial flag of the Texas Navy Association

==== Texas Navy Association ====
Although the Tideland dispute was settled on 1 June 1960, the Third Texas Navy continued to function as a social club. In 1970, its headquarters were relocated to Galveston by Governor Preston Smith. In October 1972, it was re-designated the Texas Navy Association and chartered as a nonprofit organization by Secretary of State Bob Bullock. In 1973, the Sixty-third Texas Legislature passed S.B. 94, which established the "Texas Navy Association as the official governing body of Texas Navy operations". As of 2019, the Texas Navy Association is still in operation.

=== Maritime Regiment ===
The Maritime Regiment of the Texas State Guard, also known as the Texas Maritime Regiment and TMAR, was established by the Commander-in-Chief of Texas Military Forces, Governor Rick Perry, in 2006. It is the naval militia force of Texas tasked with providing sea, littoral, and riverine operational support for homeland defense, including civil contingency, security, rescue, and disaster operations in conjunction with the United States Coast Guard, Texas Parks and Wildlife Department, Texas Forest Service, and the Lower Colorado River Authority. It operates and maintains a fleet of brown-water watercraft.

== See also ==
- Awards and decorations of the Texas Military
- List of conflicts involving the Texas Military
- Texas Military Department
- Texas Military Forces

== General bibliography ==
- Jordan, Jonathan (2006). Lone Star Navy: Texas, the Fight for the Gulf of Mexico, and the Shaping of the American West. Washington, DC: Potomac Books. ISBN 978-1-57488-512-5.
- Meed, Douglas (2001). The Fighting Texas Navy, 1832–1843. Plano, TX: Republic of Texas Press. ISBN 978-1-55622-885-8.
- Wells, Tom (1988). Commodore Moore and the Texas Navy. Austin: University of Texas Press. ISBN 978-0-292-71118-1.
- Spain Jr., Charles A. (February 1992). "Flags and Seals of Texas" (PDF). South Texas Law Review. 33 (1): 215–259.
- Dienst, Alex (2007). The Texas Navy. Fireship Press. p. 208. ISBN 978-1-934757-04-8. Originally published by Dienst in 1909 as The Navy of the Republic of Texas.
- Fischer, Earnest G (1900), Robert Potter: Founder of the Texas Navy, Pelican Publishing Company Incorporated, pp. 320, ISBN 0882890808
- Hill, Jim Dan (1987), The Texas Navy: in forgotten battles and shirtsleeve diplomacy, State House Press, pp. 224, ISBN 0938349171
- Stone, Barry (2011), True Crime and Punishment, Mutinies: Shocking Real-life Stories of Subversion at Sea, Pier 9, Murdoch Books, pp. 151–152, ISBN 1741966345
- Sullivan, Roy F. (2010), The Texas Navies, AuthorHouse, Bloomington, IN, pp. 176, ISBN 1449052584
