= Texan schooner Liberty =

Texan warship

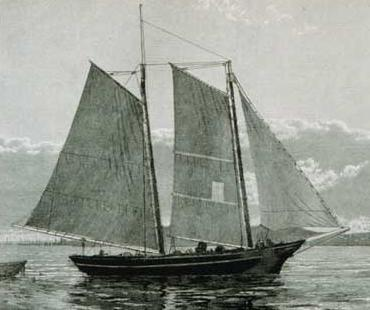
- ship similar to Texas schooner Liberty

History

Republic of Texas
- Acquired: before December 11, 1835
- Commissioned: January 5, 1836
- Decommissioned: July, 1836
- Home port: Galveston, Texas
- Fate: Levied and sold at auction to pay the cost of repairs

General characteristics
- Class & type: Schooner
- Displacement: 75 tons
- Length: 60 ft (18 m)
- Propulsion: wind
- Speed: variable
- Complement: 20-50
- Armament: 6-6 pounders

First Texas Navy

Ships
- Brutus – Independence – Invincible – Liberty

Skirmishes
- Matamoros – Brazos River – Galveston Harbor

The Texas schooner Liberty was one of the four schooners of the First Texas Navy (1836–1838). She served in the Texas Navy for only about 6 months, capturing the Mexican brig Pelicano loaded with weapons for their army in Texas. Later that year, she sailed to New Orleans accompanying the wounded Sam Houston, where she was repaired. Texas was unable to pay for the repairs and the ship was sold in June, 1836, to pay for the cost of the repairs. This left the Texas Navy with only three ships.

== History of the schooner before the Texas Navy ==
She was previously the privately owned ship William Robbins which was purchased in November 1835, by the rebellious citizens of Matagorda when the Texas-bound schooner Hannah Elizabeth was captured by the Mexican Navy brig Bravo. Hannah Elizabeth was laden with weapons and ammunition for the Texas Revolution and she was seized and run aground at Pass Cavallo, throwing her cannons overboard during the chase. Days later the Williams Robbins was placed under the command of Captain William A. Hurd who captured the Mexican Man-of-war Correo de Mejico and recaptured the Hannah Elizabeth from the Mexican prize crew and took both ships to Galveston. These actions were controversial in some quarters because they were done before the William Robbins was granted a letter of marque from the fledgling Texas government.

The William Robbins was purchased by the Texas government in Galveston on January 5, 1836, for the sum of $3,500 and was christened the Liberty. She was thus the first ship of the Texas Navy.

== Service in the Texas Navy ==
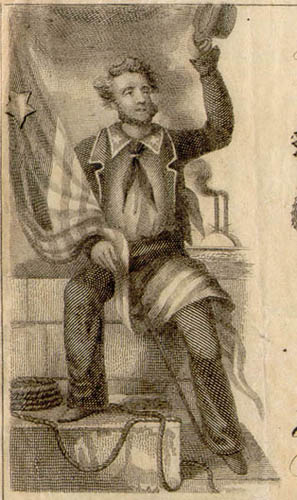
Naval scene from Republic of Texas currency, the $50 bill (1838)

Captain William S. Brown, whose brother Jeremiah Brown commanded one of the other Texas ships, Invincible, was appointed commander of the schooner in January 1836. Later that month, he set to sea to harry Mexican naval efforts to blockade the Texas coast from further shipments of arms and volunteers and at the same time to disrupt Mexican supplies from reaching their troops in Texas by sea. On March 6, while on a cruise towards the Yucatán Peninsula, Liberty captured the three-gun Mexican schooner Pelicano under the guns of the fortress at Sisal. Pelicano was sailed into Matagorda Bay and she "proved to contain 300 kegs of powder and other military supplies concealed inside cargo owned by the New Orleans firm of J.W. Zacharie. Pelicano ran aground and was lost on the bar at Matagorda, Texas, but her cargo was salvaged and used to good advantage in the San Jacinto campaign."

Captain Brown resigned just nine days after this triumph due to a quarrel with Commodore Charles Hawkins. Brown proffered charges (see original here ) and his brother was clapped in chains that same day by Commodore Hawkins. George Wheelwright was then appointed captain of Liberty in May 1836, and his first mission was to accompany and defend the ship Flora as she bore Sam Houston, who had been wounded at San Jacinto on April 21, to New Orleans for hospitalization.

In New Orleans, Liberty undertook repairs. "[U]nable to meet her refitting bills, [she] was detained in May 1836 and later sold to satisfy her creditors - an event which illustrated the shoestring budget under which the Texas Navy was forced to work despite the demands on it." With Liberty sold, the Texas Navy now was down to three ships, and peaceful independence was still elusive for Texas.

== The crew seeks prize money ==
Years later, the crew of the Liberty petitioned the Texas Congress for a share of the prize money of the Pelicano. The Judiciary Committee ruled that since the District Court of Brazoria had admiralty jurisdiction and had properly condemned the Pelicano, the crew of Liberty was entitled to a just share of the prize.
