= Texan schooner Brutus =

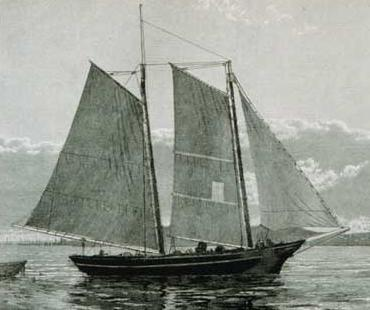
- A small schooner, similar to Brutus

History

Republic of Texas
- Commissioned: 25 January 1836
- Decommissioned: October 1838
- Out of service: 26 August 1837
- Home port: Galveston
- Fate: Run aground and destroyed by storm 1838

General characteristics
- Class & type: Schooner
- Tons burthen: 125, or 160 (bm)
- Length: 90 ft (27.4 m)
- Propulsion: wind
- Speed: variable
- Complement: 40
- Armament: 1-18 lb. Swivel gun; 9 smaller guns

First Texas Navy

Ships
- Brutus – Independence – Invincible – Liberty

Skirmishes
- Matamoros – Brazos River – Galveston Harbor

The Texan schooner Brutus was one of the four ships of the First Texas Navy (1836–1838) that during the Texas Revolution wreaked havoc on towns along the coast of Mexico, blockaded Mexican ports, and captured ships bound for Mexico with goods and munitions of war.

Her final, and most controversial, voyage was to the Yucatan, where along with her sister ship Invincible, she captured numerous prizes. Among them was the British ship Eliza Russell, the capture of which caused a diplomatic incident as Texas was seeking official recognition from the United Kingdom. When Brutus returned to Galveston to face official sanctions, Mexican ships attacked her and Invincible; both ran aground in Galveston harbor and were battered apart by storms. With the destruction of Brutus, the first Texas Navy ceased to exist.

== As a private warship ==
At the beginning of the Texas War of Independence, businessmen John and Augustus Allen endeavored to keep the Texans' supply channels open. At their own expense, they outfitted a ship called Brutus for the purpose of protecting the Texas coast and assisting troops and supplies from the United States to arrive safely in Texas.

In January 1836, the Allen brothers sold Brutus to the Texas Navy, and it became the second ship in the fledgling fleet of schooners.

== In the Texas Navy ==
Captain William A. Hurd took command of Brutus when she was commissioned into the small Texas Navy on 25 January 1836, in New Orleans. She did not reach Texan waters again until early February 1836.

After the Battle of San Jacinto, Brutus put in at New Orleans for supplies and to be refitted. Upon returning to sea duty, Brutus found herself blockaded at Matagorda by the Mexican brig Vencedor del Álamo. Word was sent to Galveston and Invincible, along with the private ships Ocean and Union, successfully broke the blockade and Captain Hurd was able to take Brutus to New York City for repairs. This was apparently done without consulting Commodore Charles Hawkins who promptly sacked Hurd as commander upon his return from New York in April 1837.

== Yucatan campaign ==
James D. Boylan was appointed Captain of the Brutus and he acted with vigor. He immediately escorted the supply ship Texas from Galveston to Matagorda and returned by midnight the same day, 10 June 1837. Within an hour Brutus was back at sea on a mission to harry Mexican commercial shipping at the mouth of the Mississippi River. Before arriving on post, Brutus was ordered to join Invincible and move to the Yucatan Peninsula. Invincible under the command of Commodore Hawkins, had aboard the Texas Secretary of the Navy, Samuel Rhoads Fisher. Fisher had personally witnessed the surrender of Independence at Matagorda in April 1837. Determined to show the value of the navy, Fisher took to sea with the last two ships of the Texas Navy.

Brutus and Invincible reached the Yucatan on 8 July 1837 and sailed to Isla Mujeres, which they claimed for Texas. The ships cruised off the Yucatan coast attacking shipping and towns with abandon. By 16 July, the two Texas schooners made prizes of the Union, the Telégrafo, and the Adventure off Sisal and on 26 July they engaged the batteries defending Campeche's harbor. Describing the attack on that city, Tom Wells writes, "Continuing up the Yucatan coast, the expedition boarded ships and landed shore parties until finally they were attacked by a cavalry force and driven back to their ships. The Texans burned two villages in reprisal, then tried to force Campeche to pay $25,000 in tribute. However, the city was surrounded by heavy stone walls and was well-fortified. After an inconclusive three-hour exchange of gunfire, the two ships departed." After the unsuccessful attempt to extort money from Campeche, the tiny flotilla sailed north and captured the Obispo and the British vessel Eliza Russell off the Alacranes and then doubled back down the Yucatan coast and then, on 12 August, captured the Correo de Tabasco. The seizure of the Eliza Russell proved to be a diplomatic incident of some note, almost resulting in the United Kingdom's refusal to recognize the Republic of Texas. (Note: Lloyd's Register reported that Eliza Russell, of 124 tons (bm), had been built at "Chlstn" in 1835. It gave the name of her master and owner as J. Russell, and her homeport as Alloa.) The ships, running low on water, started back to Galveston, but not before Brutus captured Rafaelita on 17 August and blockaded Matamoros.

== Final struggle ==
On 27 August 1837, both ships arrived in Galveston and Brutus crossed the sandbar and entered Galveston harbor. Invincible delayed and was caught by two Mexican brigs of war, the Iturbide and Libertador. Brutus made ready to join Invincible in the battle but she ran aground on a sandbar. Invincible also ran aground and was destroyed by the breakers. Brutus survived but would never be floated again. When she was destroyed by storms in October 1837, she was the last ship of the first Texas Navy.

== Vessels captured with Invincible ==
All the vessels captured were schooners.

Date	Name	Notes
25 July 1836	Telégrafo	At Sisal, Yucatán
25 July 1836	Adventure	At Sisal, Yucatán
8 August 1836	Eliza Russel	British; detained
12 August 1836	Correo de Tabasco	
17 August 1836	Rafaelita	
