= Texan schooner Independence =

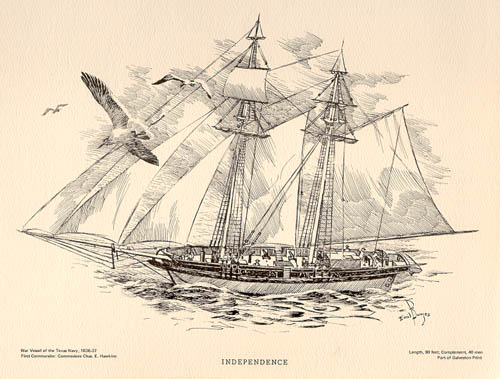
- Lithograph of Independence as flagship of the Texas Navy

History

Republic of Texas
- Name: Independence
- Builder: Webb and Allen, New York
- Cost: $1,710
- Laid down: 1830
- Launched: 1832
- Acquired: 10 January 1836
- Commissioned: 10 January 1836
- Decommissioned: 27 August 1837
- Renamed: 10 January 1836; Had been the United States Revenue cutter Ingham
- Home port: Galveston, Texas
- Captured: 17 April 1837
- Fate: Surrendered to the Mexican Navy; renamed La Independencia

General characteristics
- Class & type: Schooner
- Displacement: 125 tons
- Length: 89 ft (27 m)
- Propulsion: wind
- Speed: variable
- Complement: 40
- Armament: 6-6 pndrs; 1 long 9-pounder

First Texas Navy

Ships
- Brutus – Independence – Invincible – Liberty

Skirmishes
- Matamoros – Brazos River – Galveston Harbor

The Texan schooner Independence was one of the four schooners of the First Texas Navy (1836–1838). At the direction of Texas Governor Henry Smith, in 1836 Charles Hawkins took command of United States revenue cutter Ingham acquired by the Texas Navy and renamed Independence.

After the Texas victory at the Battle of San Jacinto in April, 1836, Independence carried the Texas President and his captive, General Santa Anna, to Velasco, where the Treaty of Velasco was negotiated and signed.

While being refitted in New Orleans in early 1837, her skipper died and a new captain was appointed. When next she sailed in April 1837, Independence was attacked and surrendered to a superior Mexican force and her officers and passengers were imprisoned. The ship was later commissioned in the Mexican Navy where she served against her former masters.

== Service during the Texas Revolution ==
At the direction of Texas Governor Henry Smith, in 1836 Charles Hawkins took command of United States revenue cutter Ingham. It had been acquired by the Texas Navy and renamed Independence. Independence traveled from Matagorda to New Orleans in March 1836 for refitting, but quickly returned to block supplies to the Mexican Army. With the retreat of Sam Houston's army after the Texans' defeats at the siege of the Battle of the Alamo and Battle of Goliad, Hawkins was forced to move his ship up the Texas coast from Matagorda to Galveston. With the rebel government in disarray during the Runaway Scrape, Independence's mission was to defend Galveston from invasion and block resupply of Santa Anna's nearby army.

== The Treaty of Velasco and after ==
Thereafter, Independence was involved in two important diplomatic missions, first in May 1836 carrying San Jacinto President David G. Burnet, with his cabinet, and Santa Anna to sign the Treaty of Velasco after the Battle of San Jacinto and then, in June, setting sail for New Orleans with commissioners Peter William Grayson and James W. Collinsworth on board. These men continued their journey to Washington, D.C., where they negotiated with the United States for the recognition of the independence of Texas.

In the summer of 1836, Independence was the only ship of the Texas Navy on duty in the Gulf of Mexico; Liberty having been sold to pay the cost of refurbishment and Invincible and Brutus in New York City for repairs. Mexican authorities had recently repudiated the Treaty of Velasco claiming that General Santa Anna did not have the capacity to bind Mexico to recognize Texas' independence. With rumors of an imminent invasion of Texas by Mexico, Independence carried out a screening and patrol action at Matamoros, which the Texans had ordered blockaded.

In the fall of 1836, Independence returned to New Orleans for refitting and while there Commodore Hawkins died of smallpox. When Independence sailed from New Orleans on 10 April 1837, with Texas minister to the United States, William H. Wharton aboard, she was skippered by her new Captain, George W. Wheelwright, who had been left without a command after the forced sale of Liberty in May 1836.

== Battle of Brazos River ==
On her next cruise, Independence had smooth sailing for about seven days when on 17 April she encountered the Mexican brigs-of-war Vencedor del Álamo and Libertador off the mouth of the Brazos River. The initial sighting of the two Mexican brigs was at about 5:30 am. Outgunned and outmanned, Independence fled up Brazos River for protection at the small riverside town of Velasco. The Mexican vessels pursued the Texans; eventually the two brigs came within cannon range several hours later at 9:30 am. Vincedor del Alamo of sixteen 8-pound guns and 140 men, sailed with Libertador of six 12-pound guns and one 18-pounder, crewed by about 100 men.

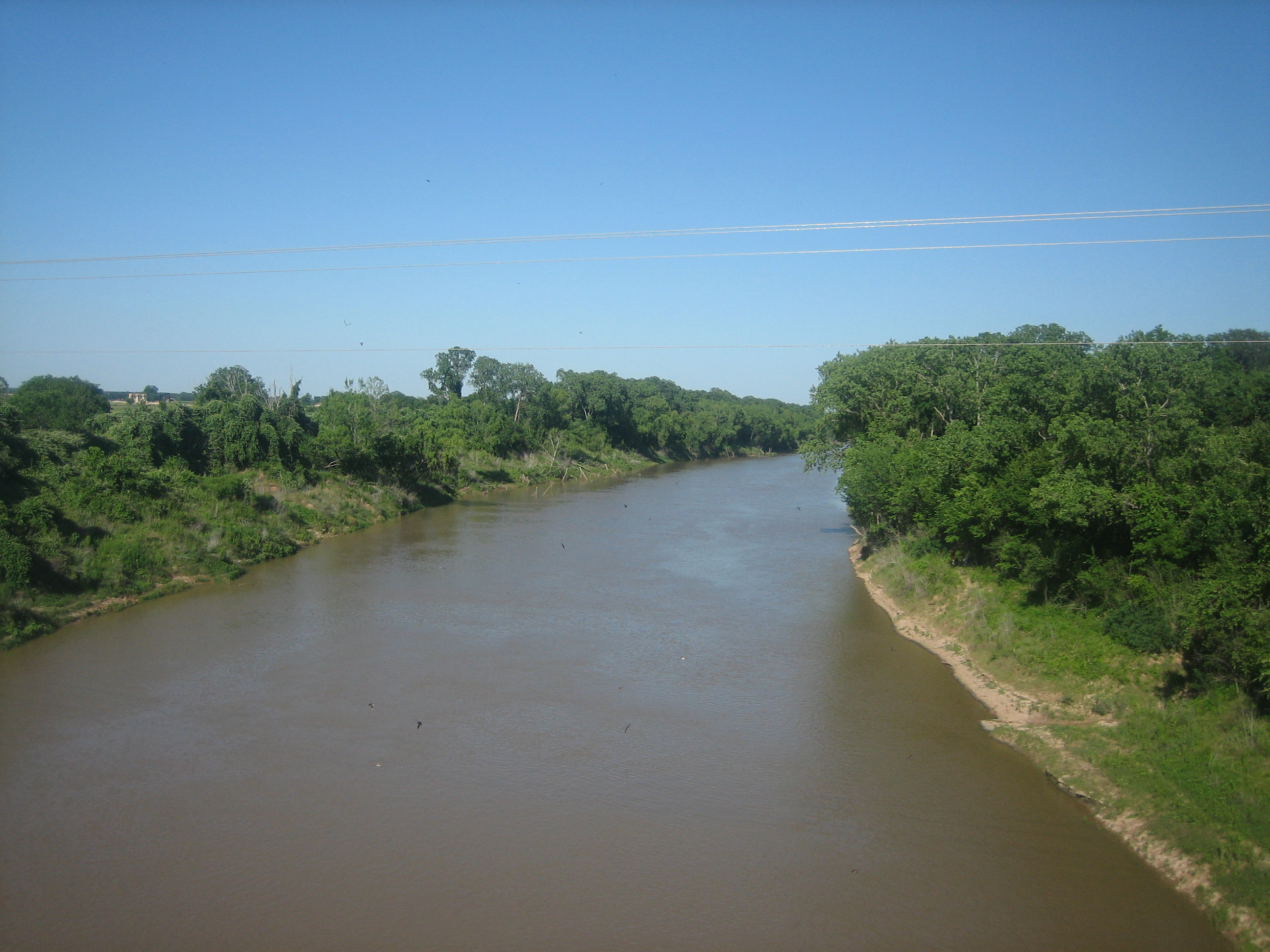
Brazos River

Independence of eight guns total, raised her colors followed by Libertador which then fired the first broadside that had no effect. Shortly afterward Independence fired a broadside with her weather battery of one 9-pound gun, three 6-pound guns, and one pivot gun. For two hours, Independence continued up Brazos River with the Mexican brigs in close pursuit, occasionally stopping to fire on each other. By 11:30 am the Texans had reached Velasco; Captain Wheelwright had no choice but to fight to the end, apparently not being able to continue up the Brazos River any further. The final engagement took place right in front of the small Texan town and populace, including the Texas Secretary of the Navy Samuel Rhoads Fisher. The Mexicans not being far behind came within range and Captain Wheelwright ordered his men to engage once more. The shots managed to damage the main top-gallant mast of the Libertador. After another broadside in Libertador's direction, two Mexicans lay dead and a few more were wounded aboard the brig-of-war. More shots damaged Libertador's foremast and knocked out one of her 12 pounders. However, these broadsides did not slow the Mexican ships; Libertador approached Independence head on while Vincedor del Alamo maneuvered around to Independence's other side. The two brigs quickly came within pistol shots range and both fired a mixture of cannon projectiles. This is when a ball smashed through Independence's quarter gallery wall and into the Texan captain, taking off three of his fingers on his right hand. Severely wounded and taken below, command of the schooner passed to Lieutenant John W. Taylor, who finished the last few moments of battle before receiving orders from Wheelwright to surrender. With this action, the battle was over.

Taylor surrendered the ship. Imprisoned in Matamoros, Independence's officers and Wharton eventually escaped or were released by the Mexican government. The ship was taken into service of the Mexican Navy under the new name La Independencia.

== See also ==
- List of ships captured in the 19th century
- Bibliography of early American naval history
