= Texan schooner Invincible =

Historical marine vessel

History

Texas
- Commissioned: January 18, 1836
- Decommissioned: August 27, 1837
- Fate: Run aground and destroyed 1837

General characteristics
- Class & type: Schooner
- Tons burthen: 100, or 125 (bm)
- Length: 75 ft (23 m)
- Propulsion: wind
- Speed: variable
- Complement: 40, or 70
- Armament: 1):2 × 18 pounder + 2 × 9 pounder + 4 × 6 pounder guns; 2):1 × 9-pounder gun + 6 carronades

First Texas Navy

Ships
- Brutus – Independence – Invincible – Liberty

Skirmishes
- Matamoros – Brazos River – Galveston Harbor

The Texas schooner Invincible was one of the four schooners of the Revolutionary Texas Navy (1836-1837). She began her service in January 1836 and immediately began attacking ships supplying the Mexican army in Texas, including capturing the United States merchant vessel Pocket and later the British ship Eliza Russell. Both of these actions caused diplomatic incidents between the Republic of Texas and the United States and the United Kingdom.

Invincible was refitted in New York City and barely avoided being seized by the United States Navy for violating the neutrality of the United States. She served until she was run aground and wrecked at Galveston, Texas on August 27, 1837 while fleeing two ships of the Mexican Navy. During her short career in the service of the Republic of Texas, she was a raider and flagship of the small Texian navy.

== Purchase and commissioning of the Invincible ==
Because of the activities of Mexican raiding vessels along the coast of the Gulf of Mexico, the provisional government of Texas in the 1830s became acutely aware of the need for a navy. On the day that Texas acquired the first ship to the purpose, Liberty, the General Council reported that they were being offered another, Invincible, which they recommended be examined and, if suitable, purchased immediately. Originally built as a slave trader in a Baltimore shipyard, the schooner was being presented to the government by new owners, Texas special agents Thomas F. McKinney and Samuel May Williams, who had purchased her for $12,013.02 and were asking a 12.5% commission. She was approved and purchased three days thereafter, on January 8, 1836.

The schooner had been built sturdily, but for speed, and was fitted in New Orleans with two 18-pounder long guns, two 9-pounders and four 6-pounders. The costs were borne by General Thomas J. Green, Texas general agent William Bryan, and purchasing agent Edward Hall. By the time the 70-crew Invincible was prepared for service, she cost almost $20,000.00.

On March 12, 1836, she was given over to the command of Captain Jeremiah Brown.

== Destruction of Bravo and capture of Pocket ==
Captain Brown had been given a specific initial mission: to protect the Texas coast from the Mexican man-of-war Montezuma. On April 3, 1836, he found her. By that time renamed Bravo, the 20-gun man-of-war was near the mouth of the Rio Grande awaiting a refit for a lost rudder when Invincible came up. One of her lieutenants, William H. Leving, was sent to Bravo on a small boat, but when Bravo attempted to flee with Leving on board, Invincible opened fire. Bravo ran aground on a sandbar near the north beach and there broadsides destroyed her. While Invincible suffered no damage in the conflict, Bravo's crew escaped with Leving and hanged him for piracy.

Invincible's battle with Bravo was witnessed by the captain and crew of the American-owned brig Pocket. This merchant vessel, captained by Elijah Howe, was carrying food and weapons to Santa Anna's army in Texas. It also carried important evidence of Santa Anna's plans to seize the ports of Texas and station men on the strategically important and heavily populated Galveston Island. After the destruction of Bravo, Brown captured Pocket and arrived with her in Galveston on April 8. Sam Houston's army received the seized supplies fortified Galveston Island with them. Texas historian Jim Dan Hill, writing during the Texas Centennial in 1936 credited Invincible with contributing mightily to Sam Houston's victory at San Jacinto by depriving the Mexicans of the reinforcements that Bravo would have brought and by redirecting Pocket's supplies to the Texans just before the battle.

== Charges of piracy ==
Upon leaving Pocket, Captain Howe lodged a complaint of piracy against Captain Brown. The sloop Warren captured Invincible on May 1 and took her to New Orleans, along with 46 of her crew. Brown escaped capture. The crew was soon released when insufficient testimony was offered to counter the defense's claim that Invincible had apprehended Pocket for violating the laws of the Republic of Texas and of nations, by carrying contraband and spies to Santa Anna. After the courts released his men, Brown surrendered and also was released. However, the government of Texas agreed to settle with the United States for Pocket by paying $11,750.00. This was paid, with interest to a total of $12,455.00, on July 6, 1849.

== Repairs in New York ==
Thereafter, Invincible defended the coast until June, when she was ordered to transport Santa Anna to Veracruz. Santa Anna was already aboard the schooner when General Thomas Jefferson Green arrived on June 5 from New Orleans aboard Ocean to forbid the transport.

On July 4, Invincible was sent to Matagorda to defend the schooner Brutus, which was blockaded by the Vencedor del Alamo. Invincible offered to engage the retreating Vencedor del Alamo in battle near Vera Cruz, but were told that the crew was not able to fight.

In September, Invincible arrived in New York city for repairs and might have remained there due to lack of funds to pay for the services. However, Texas benefactor Samuel Swartwout settled the debt to release the ship from impoundment. Pursued by a ship sent to arrest the crew for violating the neutrality laws of the United States, she fled back to Galveston, arriving on March 14, 1837.

== New captain and final battle ==
In April 1837, Invincible received a new captain, Commodore H. L. Thompson, who after a fruitless search for enemy on the Texas coast alongside Brutus, set off for Mexico. The ships captured several pirogues and burned eight or nine Mexican towns before capturing several vessels. One of these was the merchantman Eliza Russell, a British ship that was flying a neutral flag and carrying no contraband. (Note: Lloyd's Register reported that Eliza Russell, of 124 tons (bm), had been built at "Chlstn" in 1835. It gave the name of her master and owner as J. Russell, and her homeport as Alloa.) Eliza Russell was quickly released, but the British government later demanded, and received, about $4,000.00 compensation for the detainment. Because of such acts and because Invincible had continued sailing several months beyond her sailing orders, President Sam Houston relieved Captain Thompson of his command. Houston also dismissed Texas's Secretary of the Navy, Samuel Rhoads Fisher, who had abandoned his position to join the ships. Thompson would die on November 1, 1837, before he could be brought to trial.

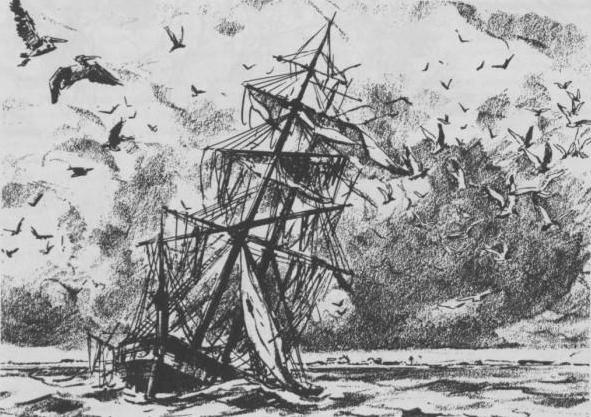
The wreck of the schooner Invincible at Galveston in 1837 by E.M. Schiwetz

Invincible and Brutus returned to Galveston on August 26, 1837, but while Brutus entered the harbor, poor weather kept Invincible outside. In the morning, Vencedor del Alamo and Libertador attacked her. Brutus attempted to come to Invincible's assistance, but ran aground. When after some time resisting Invincible attempted to enter the harbor, she too ran aground. Her crew abandoned her and Invincible was dashed to pieces during the night. The First Texas Navy had lost its two final ships and was no more.

On May 23, 1838, President Houston agreed to pay the officers and crew one half of the value of the prizes they had obtained, albeit illegally, on their last cruise.

== Vessels captured with Brutus ==
All the vessels captured were schooners.

Date	Name	Notes
25 July 1836	Telégrafo	At Sisal, Yucatán
25 July 1836	Adventure	At Sisal, Yucatán
8 August 1836	Eliza Russel	British; detained
12 August 1836	Correo de Tabasco	
17 August 1836	Rafaelita	

== Postscript ==
The National Underwater and Marine Agency, founded by Clive Cussler, investigated in 1995. He found a few items, but not nearly enough to have been the Invincible. He also found that the sea bottom was hard clay below four layers of silt. The clay would have prevented the wreck from sinking into the sea bed, so he speculated that subsequent hurricanes scattered the ships remains far and wide, burying them in sand.
