= Charles Edward Hawkins =

Texas Navy commander (1802–1837)

- Born: 1802; New York
- Died: 1837 (aged 34–35); New Orleans, Louisiana
- Military career
- Allegiance: United States; Mexico; Republic of Texas
- Branch: United States Navy (1818–1826); Mexican Navy (1826–1828); Texas Navy (1836–1837)
- Rank: Midshipman (USN); Captain (Mexican Navy); Commodore (Texas Navy)
- Commands: Texas Navy

Charles Edward Hawkins (1802 – February 11, 1837) was the Commander of the First Texas Navy during the Texan Revolution.

== Early life ==
Hawkins was born in 1802 in New York, and he joined the United States Navy as a midshipman.

== Career in the U.S. Navy ==
He served on board the frigates Constitution, Constellation and Guerriere. After serving along the Atlantic seaboard, Hawkins was transferred to the U.S. West Indies Squadron which was commanded by Commodore David Porter on a mission to suppress piracy. In 1826, When Commodore Porter was court-martialed for invading a town in Puerto Rico without authorization, Porter resigned his commission in the U.S. Navy and joined the Mexican Navy, and Hawkins followed his mentor in entering Mexican service.

== Service in the Mexican Navy ==
As captain of the Hermón, he saw action in the Gulf of Mexico against the Spanish fleet which was opposing Mexico's struggle for independence. Hawkins resigned in 1828 and returned to the United States.

== Commander of the First Texas Navy ==
While living in New Orleans, Hawkins became acquainted with Mexican Colonel José Antonio Mexía who was opposed to Mexican strongman Antonio López de Santa Anna on his 1835 Tampico Expedition. The expedition failed and in 1836, Hawkins approached the governor of Mexican Texas, Henry Smith, supporting Texas' independence and offering to serve in the new Texas Navy. Smith was impressed with Hawkins' credentials and sent him to New Orleans purchase the United States Revenue cutter Ingham. Hawkins did and took command of the newly acquired schooner naming it the Independence.

By January 10, 1836, Hawkins in command of the Independence returned to the Texas coast, cruising between Galveston and Tampico "destroying a considerable number of small craft, with all material on board that could be used to the injury of Texas. In March 1836, Hawkins took Independence to New Orleans for refitting. When he returned to his base at Matagorda, Texas, Hawkins was promoted to the rank of Commodore and placed in command of the entire Texas Navy.

After the Texans' defeats at the Battle of the Alamo and Battle of Goliad, the Navy had to move its operations further up the coast to Galveston. After the Texans' victory at the Battle of San Jacinto, Hawkins ordered the fleet south again to blockade the port of Matamoros, Tamaulipas. Eventually the poor state of the Texan ships forced them all into port with the Independence going to New Orleans for retrofitting in September 1837. There, in February 1837, Hawkins died of smallpox at the home of a Mrs. Hale. Upon his death he was replaced as captain of the Independence by George W. Wheelwright.
