= Timeline of the Republic of Texas =

This is a timeline of the Republic of Texas, spanning the time from the Texas Declaration of Independence from Mexico on March 2, 1836, up to the transfer of power to the State of Texas on February 19, 1846.

== 1836 ==
Texas declares independence

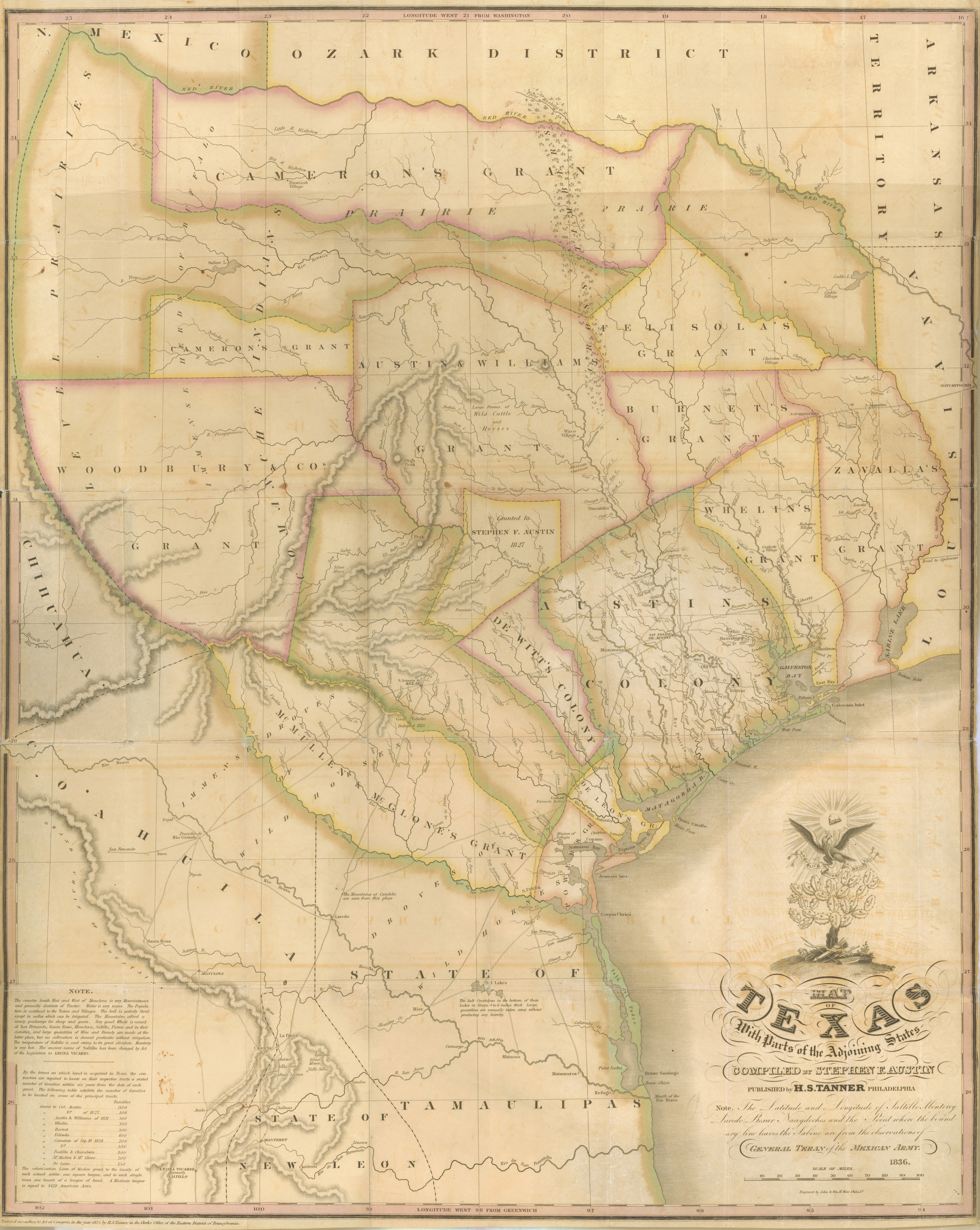
Austin and Tanner map of Texas in 1836

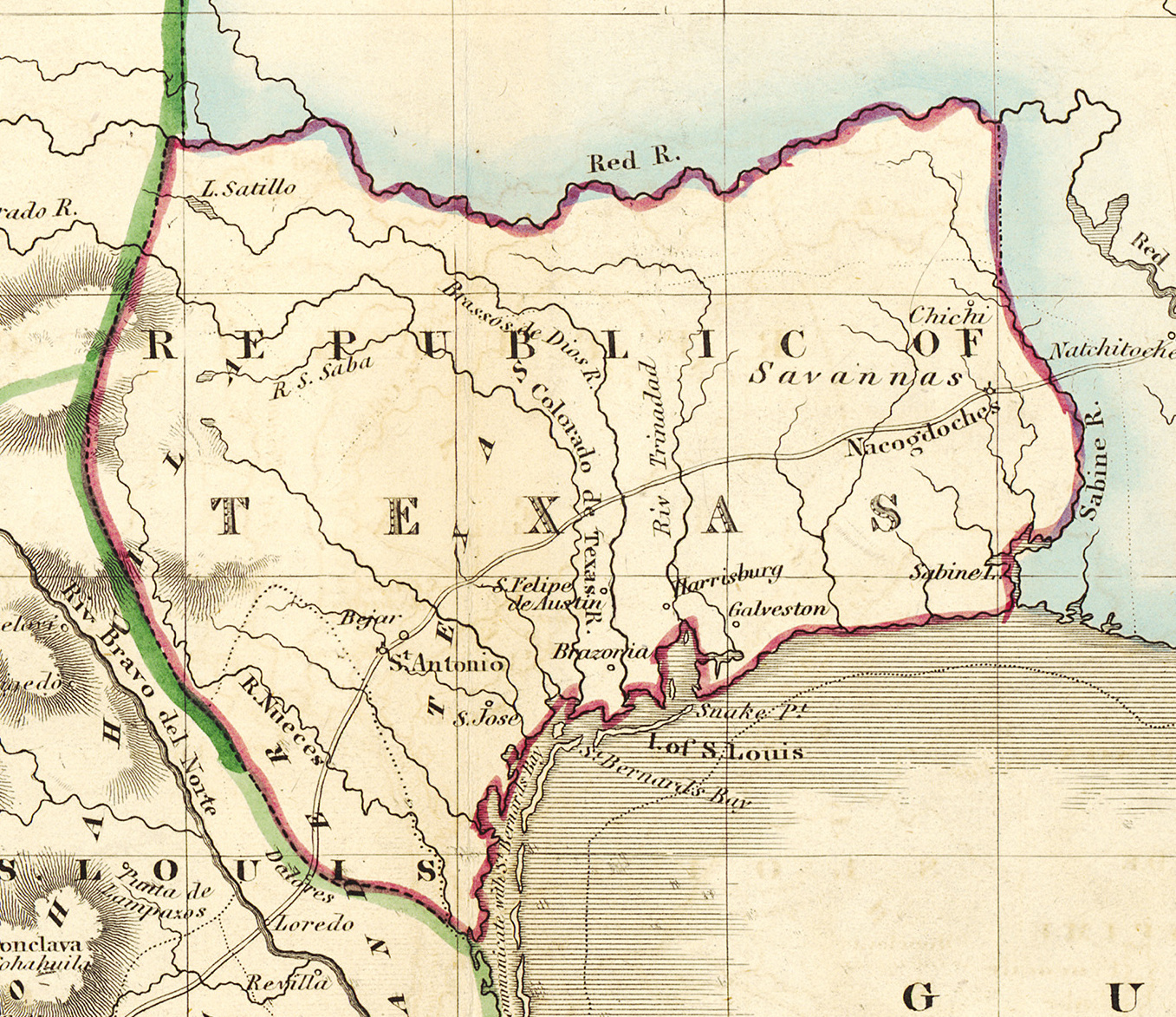
Detail of the Republic of Texas from the Lizars map of Mexico and Guatemala, circa 1836

- March 2 – The Texas Declaration of Independence is signed by 58 delegates at an assembly at Washington-on-the-Brazos and the Republic of Texas is declared. David G. Burnet is elected ad interim president by the delegates. Texians with Dr. James Grant are defeated at the Battle of Agua Dulce.
- March 3 – James B. Bonham slips back into the Alamo under cover of darkness to deliver the grim news that Col. James Fannin's relief column from Goliad will not be coming. Col. William B. Travis sends out his final courier, John William Smith, with letters to the convention presidency detailing their absolute resolve.
- March 4 – The Constitutional Convention at Washington-on-the-Brazos officially appoints Sam Houston as Commander-in-Chief of all regular, volunteer, and militia forces in the field. At San Antonio De Bèxar, General Santa Anna holds a council of war, overriding his generals' advice to wait for heavy siege guns and planning an immediate infantry assault.
- March 5 - The 12-day artillery bombardment of the Alamo suddenly ceases in the evening. Taking advantage of the quiet, the exhausted Texan garrison falls into a deep sleep. Santa Anna coordinates four massive assault columns to move into position under cover of darkness.
- March 6 – Battle of the Alamo: At 5:00 AM, Mexican infantry columns launch a pre-dawn surprise attack. By 6:30 AM, after a fierce breach of the north wall, the perimeter collapses. All Texan and Tejano combatants, including William B. Travis, Jim Bowie, and Davy Crockett are killed. Civilian survivors are spared to spread word of the defeat.
- March 11 – Sam Houston arrives in Gonzales to take direct command of the gathering volunteers (roughly 374 raw recruits). Civilian scouts bring the first rumors of the Alamo's destruction, sparking the immediate panic of the Runaway Scrape.
- March 12 – Houston dispatches orders to Fannin at Goliad, commanding him to blow up the fortress of Presidio La Bahía, fall back to Victoria, and help form a unified defensive line. The Battle of Refugio begins: Texian troops commanded by Lieutenant Colonel William Ward and Amon B. King are attacked by General Urrea. After several hours of fighting, the Texians retreat.
- March 13 - Susanna Dickinson arrives in Gonzales, confirming the total destruction of the Alamo garrison. Houston orders an immediate retreat eastward and instructs his men to burn Gonzales to the ground to deny shelter to the Mexican army, initiating the Runaway Scrape.
- March 15 - Sent by Fannin to rescue families at the Refugio Mission, Captain Amon B. King and Colonel William Ward's detachments are split and cut off by General José de Urrea’s rapidly advancing cavalry wing. King and Ward's troops are captured by the Mexicans. Houston’s retreating army reaches the Navidad River.
- March 16 - Under Santa Anna's sweeping decree classifying all armed foreigners as pirates, Captain King and 14 of his men are executed outside the Refugio mission.
- March 17 - At Washington-on-the-Brazos, the delegates hastily draft, finalize, and adopt the Constitution of the Republic of Texas. David G. Burnet is selected as ad interim President. Hearing of the advancing Mexican army, the government flees eastward toward Harrisburg.
- March 19 – Battle of Coleto: Fannin finally evacuates Goliad late in the morning. By 3:00 PM, Urrea's cavalry catches and surrounds Fannin’s 300 men in an open prairie depression short of Coleto Creek. The Texans form a hollow square and fight off repeated charges until nightfall.
- March 20 – Out of water, low on ammunition, and facing freshly reinforced Mexican artillery, Fannin signs articles of capitulation (surrender). Believing they are surrendering as honorable prisoners of war, the Texans are marched back to Goliad and imprisoned.
- March 21 – Houston’s retreating army arrives at the Brazos River at San Felipe de Austin, a critical crossing point, while panicked civilian populations clog roads heading toward the United States border. The Battle of Copano is also fought.
- March 27 – Goliad Massacre: Palm Sunday. Under explicit, written counter-orders from Santa Anna overriding Urrea's requests for clemency, Captain Carolino Huerta and Colonel Garay marches Fannin and roughly 342 Texan prisoners out of Presidio La Bahía in three columns. They are systematically shot down by firing squads. Fannin and the wounded are executed inside the fort shortly after. Houston and his army camp near San Felipe de Austin.
- March 28 - Houston moves his army upriver to Jared Groce's plantation. He uses this secure location to break his retreat, establish a camp hospital, and begin intensive military drill and organization for the raw volunteer infantry units.

- April 11 - The Twin Sisters, two six-pounder cannons donated by the citizens of Cincinnati, Ohio, arrive at Houston's camp at Groce's Plantation, giving the Texans their first functional artillery.
- April 12 - Houston's army begins crossing the swollen Brazos River using the commandeered steamboat Yellow Stone, a logistically complex operation completed over two days.
- April 14 - Santa Anna accelerates his advance, personally leading a vanguard of roughly 700 men to San Felipe, then turning southeast toward Harrisburg in an attempt to capture the fleeing Texas ad interim government.
- April 16 - The Texian Army reaches a critical crossroads at New Kentucky. Rather than continuing northeast toward the safety of the U.S. border (which many men feared Houston intended), Houston turns his column southeast toward Harrisburg to pursue Santa Anna.
- April 18 - Houston's army arrives opposite the smoking ruins of Harrisburg, which Santa Anna had burned. Texan scouts under Deaf Smith capture a Mexican courier carrying detailed mail bags, revealing Santa Anna’s exact location, isolation from his main army, and military strength.
- April 19 - Houston leaves his baggage train and sick guarded by a small detachment and marches his remaining 900 men across Buffalo Bayou, moving through the night toward the San Jacinto River ferry.
- April 20 - The Texian army sets up a concealed camp in an oak grove along Buffalo Bayou. In the afternoon, Santa Anna’s vanguard arrives on the plain of San Jacinto. A brief, sharp skirmish erupts between Texan cavalry and Mexican infantry, but both sides withdraw to their lines for the night.
- April 21 – Battle of San Jacinto: 9:00 AM: General Martín Perfecto de Cos arrives with roughly 540 reinforcements for Santa Anna, but his men are exhausted from a forced march. Santa Anna fails to post adequate sentries and allows his camp to take an afternoon siesta. 3:30 PM: Houston forms his battle line in total silence, hidden by the terrain. 4:30 PM: The Texans launch a surprise assault across the open prairie, yelling "Remember the Alamo! Remember Goliad!" The main battle lasts a mere 18 minutes. The Mexican camp is completely routed; over 600 Mexican soldiers are killed, and hundreds are captured. Houston is severely wounded in the ankle. Santa Anna escapes during the battle.
- April 22 - Texan search parties capture Santa Anna hiding in the marsh wearing a private's uniform. He is brought before the wounded Sam Houston and surrenders, ordering his remaining generals to halt hostilities and withdraw.
- April 26 - General Vicente Filisola assumes command of the remaining Mexican forces in Texas (over 4,000 men) and begins organizing an orderly retreat south, honoring Santa Anna's orders due to supply failures and mud.
- May 14 – Ad Interim President David G. Burnet and the captured Santa Anna sign the Treaties of Velasco (one public, one secret). The public treaty ends hostilities and orders all Mexican troops south of the Rio Grande; the secret treaty promises Santa Anna's safe release in exchange for his lobbying for Mexican recognition of Texas independence with the Rio Grande as the border.
- June 15: Filisola’s retreating army crosses the international boundary at the Nueces River, completely evacuating Anglo-settled Texas.
- September 5 - Texas holds its first general election. Voters overwhelmingly ratify the Constitution, vote heavily in favor of future annexation by the United States, and elect war hero Sam Houston as the first constitutional President of the Republic.
- October 3 - The 1st Congress of the Republic of Texas assembles at Columbia.
- October 22 - Sam Houston is formally inaugurated as President in the temporary capital of Columbia, Texas.
- December 27 - Stephen F. Austin, serving as Secretary of State, dies of severe pneumonia at the age of 43. Sam Houston officially proclaims him the "Father of Texas."

== 1837 ==
- January 1 - President Sam Houston issues an executive order officially organizing the First Regiment of Infantry and assigning officers to various frontier posts to replace departing volunteers.
- January 7 - The Texas Senate confirms the appointments of multiple customs collectors for the newly established revenue districts along the Gulf Coast.
- January 14 - Judge Benjamin C. Franklin opens the first session of the Republic's newly established judicial district court in Brazoria, marking the formal introduction of statutory common law courts in Texas.
- January 27 - The Texas garrison at San Antonio de Béxar sends an urgent courier to the War Department requesting winter coats, blankets, and horses, noting that freezing weather and local foraging have exhausted their immediate supplies.
- February 5 - A large delegation of Tonkawa scouts arrives at the Texas military outpost on the Navasota River to renew their military alliance against the Comanche.
- February 12 - Armed with authorization from the Boundary Act, Texas surveyor columns begin mapping the public lands directly east of the Nueces River to prepare for land bounty certificates issued to veterans.
- February 20 - The British commercial bark Milton arrives off Galveston Island, testing the Republic's new maritime tariff regulations and delivery systems.
- February 28 - General Felix Huston, commanding the remaining volunteer army at Victoria, issues an unapproved public address calling for an aggressive, immediate naval and land expedition against the Mexican port of Matamoros.
- March 1 - Frustrated by Felix Huston’s insubordination, President Houston appoints Albert Sidney Johnston to take supreme command of the army. When Johnston arrives at the camp, Huston challenges him to a duel. Johnston is severely wounded in the hip, leaving Huston in temporary command of the volatile volunteer units.
- March 3 - On his final full day in office, U.S. President Andrew Jackson signs the formal congressional resolution recognizing the Republic of Texas as an independent nation. He appoints Alcée Louis la Branche as the first American Chargé d’Affaires to Texas.
- March 11 - News of the official United States recognition reaches the temporary capital at Columbia, sparking widespread public celebrations and cannon salutes.
- March 20 - The Texas Navy schooner Brutus arrives at Galveston after a coastal patrol, reporting that Mexican brigatines-of-war are maintaining a loose blockade near the mouth of the Mississippi River to intercept Texas-bound supply ships.
- April 3 - Texas Secretary of the Treasury Henry Smith issues a formal warning that the government has completely exhausted its hard-currency reserves and recommends printing the first run of interest-bearing promissory notes (known as "Star Money") to pay civil servants.
- April 12 - The ad interim government's records, archives, and furniture are loaded onto wagons in Columbia and shipped down the Brazos River, beginning their transit to the new capital city of Houston.
- April 17 - The Battle of the Brazos River. The Texas Navy flagship schooner Independence engages the Mexican brigs-of-war Vencedor del Álamo and Libertador near the mouth of the Brazos River. The action results in the surrender and capture of the heavily damaged Texan vessel within sight of Velasco, signaling the beginning collapse of the First Texas Navy.
- April 26 - President Sam Houston arrives at the newly surveyed capital city of Houston. He finds a settlement composed primarily of tents, half-built pine log structures, and muddy avenues cleared through the woods.
- May 1 - The capital is officially moved from Columbia to the newly surveyed, muddy frontier town of Houston. The 1st Congress of the Republic of Texas reconvenes for its second session, meeting for the first time inside the unfinished, unroofed frame of the capitol building in Houston.
- May 5 - President Houston delivers his congressional address, emphasizing the historic significance of U.S. recognition, but strongly warning Congress that national spending must be immediately curtailed to avoid hyperinflation.
- May 18 - Alarmed by Felix Huston's continued plans to march the army on Matamoros and launch a military coup against the civilian government, President Houston takes advantage of Huston's temporary absence. He orders Secretary of War Thomas J. Rusk to furlough two-thirds of the volunteer army (roughly 1,800 men) indefinitely, effectively dissolving the standing army to ensure civilian control.
- May 24 - The Texas Congress passes an emergency act authorizing the creation of a corps of mounted volunteers; the structural precursor to the formalized Texas Rangers; to patrol the vast frontier gaps left by the disbanded regular army.
- June 3 - A large band of northern Comanche raiders strikes settlements along the Trinity River, killing three settlers and driving off local livestock, triggering the mobilization of local militia units.
- June 8 - The Texas Senate confirms the appointment of Memucan Hunt Jr. as the official Minister Plenipotentiary to the United States, instructing him to travel to Washington, D.C., to open formal annexation negotiations.
- June 12 - Congress passes a comprehensive land law establishing a General Land Office to manage the chaotic system of Spanish, Mexican, and revolutionary land grants, though implementation is delayed due to frontier instability.
- June 20 - President Houston signs an act defining the punishment for slave stealing, cattle rustling, and treason against the Republic, aiming to stabilize the volatile frontier legal system.
- July 4 - The first major Independence Day celebrations are held in the town of Houston, featuring political speeches, military parades by local militia companies, and formal balls.
- July 15 - Heavy summer rains cause Buffalo Bayou to overflow, flooding the main dirt thoroughfares of the capital and completely halting wagon transportation from the coast for over a week.
- July 23 - Texas Ranger Captain Coleman reports that his company has completed a line of defensive blockhouses along the Colorado River to shield the scattered farming settlements from continuous raiding parties.
- August 4 - In Washington, D.C., Texas Minister Memucan Hunt Jr. officially presents a formal letter to U.S. Secretary of State John Forsyth proposing the annexation of Texas to the United States.
- August 14 - Yellow fever is reported in the coastal ports of Galveston and Velasco, prompting the capital to establish primitive quarantine checkpoints along the main river routes.
- August 25 - U.S. Secretary of State Forsyth officially rejects the Texas annexation proposal, stating that absorbing a nation locked in an unrecognized war with Mexico would violate American neutrality treaties and trigger severe domestic political division over the expansion of slave states.
- August 26 - The Battle of Galveston Harbor. The Texas Navy schooners Invincible and Brutus engage the Mexican warships Libertador and Venecedor Del Álamo off the coast of Galveston. The action effectively ends the First Texas Navy after the loss of both Texan schooners.
- September 4 - The third session of the First Texas Congress assembles in Houston. The primary focus shifts entirely toward establishing self-sufficiency and seeking European alliances following the American rejection of annexation.
- September 25 - Following an extensive investigation into the economic viability of the country by diplomat Alphonse Dubois de Saligny, France officially signs a treaty of amity and commerce with Texas, becoming the first European superpower to recognize the Republic.
- October 1 - A severe autumnal gale strikes the Texas coast, destroying warehouses in Galveston and flattening several temporary frame structures in the capital.
- October 12 - President Houston issues an official executive proclamation warning land locators and surveyors to cease entering Indian hunting grounds up the Brazos and Trinity Rivers, hoping to prevent an all-out frontier war.
- October 23 - The Texas Congress passes an updated militia act, requiring all free white males between the ages of 18 and 45 to maintain a functional rifle, a pound of gunpowder, and to attend monthly local muster drills.
- November 4 - The Second Congress of the Republic of Texas convenes its first regular session in Houston, immediately forming committees to address the total depreciation of the nation's printed promissory notes.
- November 10 - The Battle of Stone Houses. A company of 18 Texas Rangers under Lieutenant A. B. Van Benthusen is surrounded by a force of roughly 150 Kichai Indians near the Trinity River. After a fierce day-long fight from a ravine, the Rangers are forced to retreat after losing nearly half their detachment.
- November 20 - The Texas Treasury begins issuing the first "Consolidated Fund" notes, commonly called "Redbacks" due to the distinct blank red ink on the reverse side, in a desperate attempt to replace the failed first run of currency.
- December 2 - The Texas Senate rejects a proposal to move the capital away from Houston to a more central location, deciding that the government infrastructure cannot handle another physical relocation during the current fiscal crisis.
- December 14 - Congress passes an act legalizing the collection of specific municipal taxes in San Antonio, Goliad, and Nacogdoches to fund local frontier defense guards.
- December 21 - President Houston signs an updated judicial bill establishing a formal schedule for the Supreme Court of the Republic of Texas to meet annually in the capital starting each January.
- December 30 - A major diplomatic convoy from the United States arrives in Houston, carrying the official credentials for the new American legation and solidifying the sovereign international standing of the young Republic at the close of its first full calendar year.

== 1838 ==
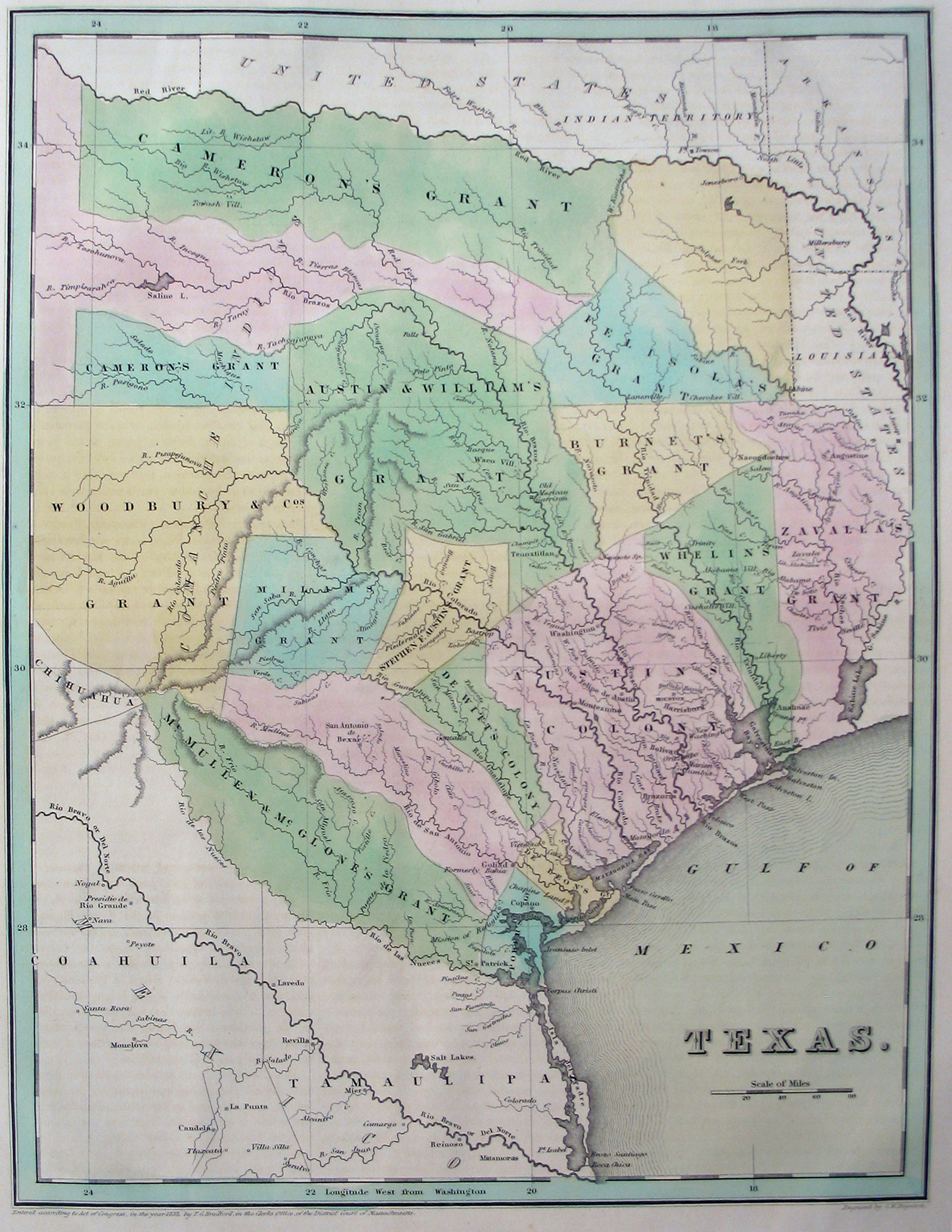
Thomas Gamaliel Bradford's 1838 map of the Republic of Texas, showing the Nueces River as its southern boundary

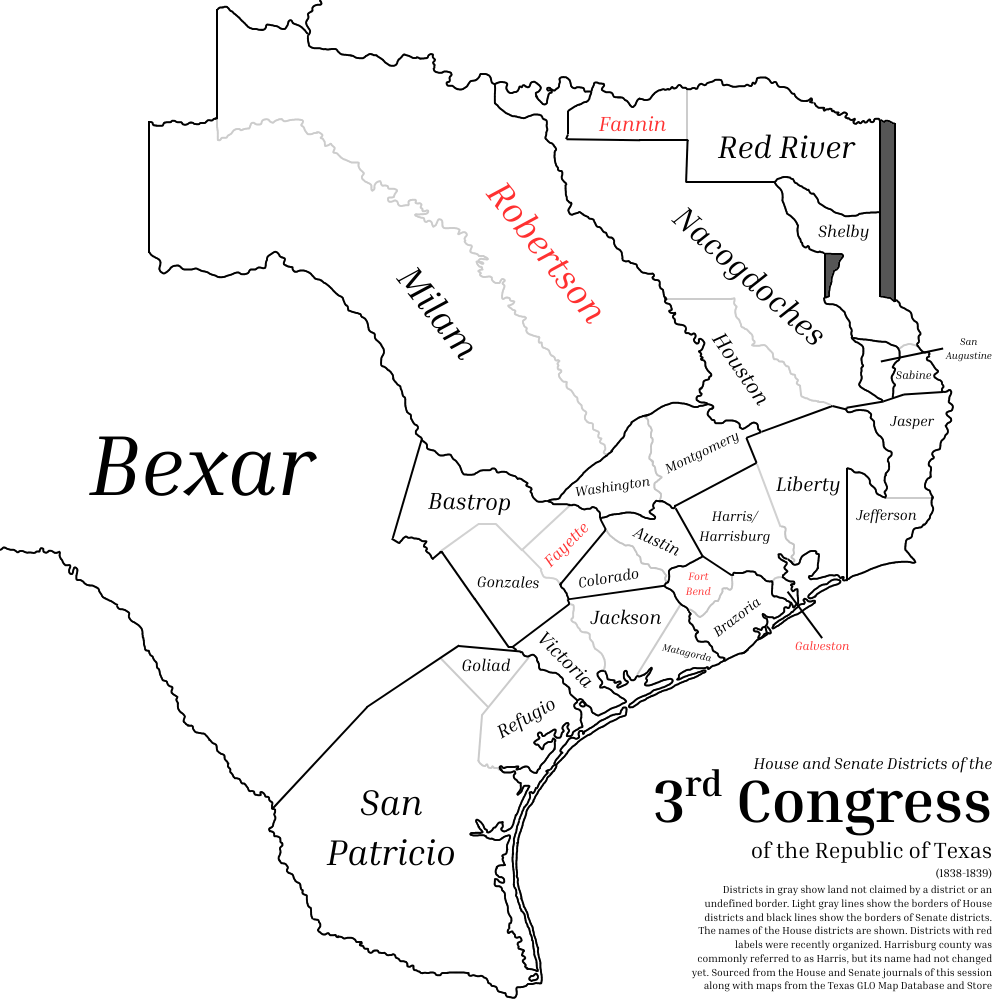
A map of House and Senate Districts from the 3rd Congress, which served from 1838 to 1839.

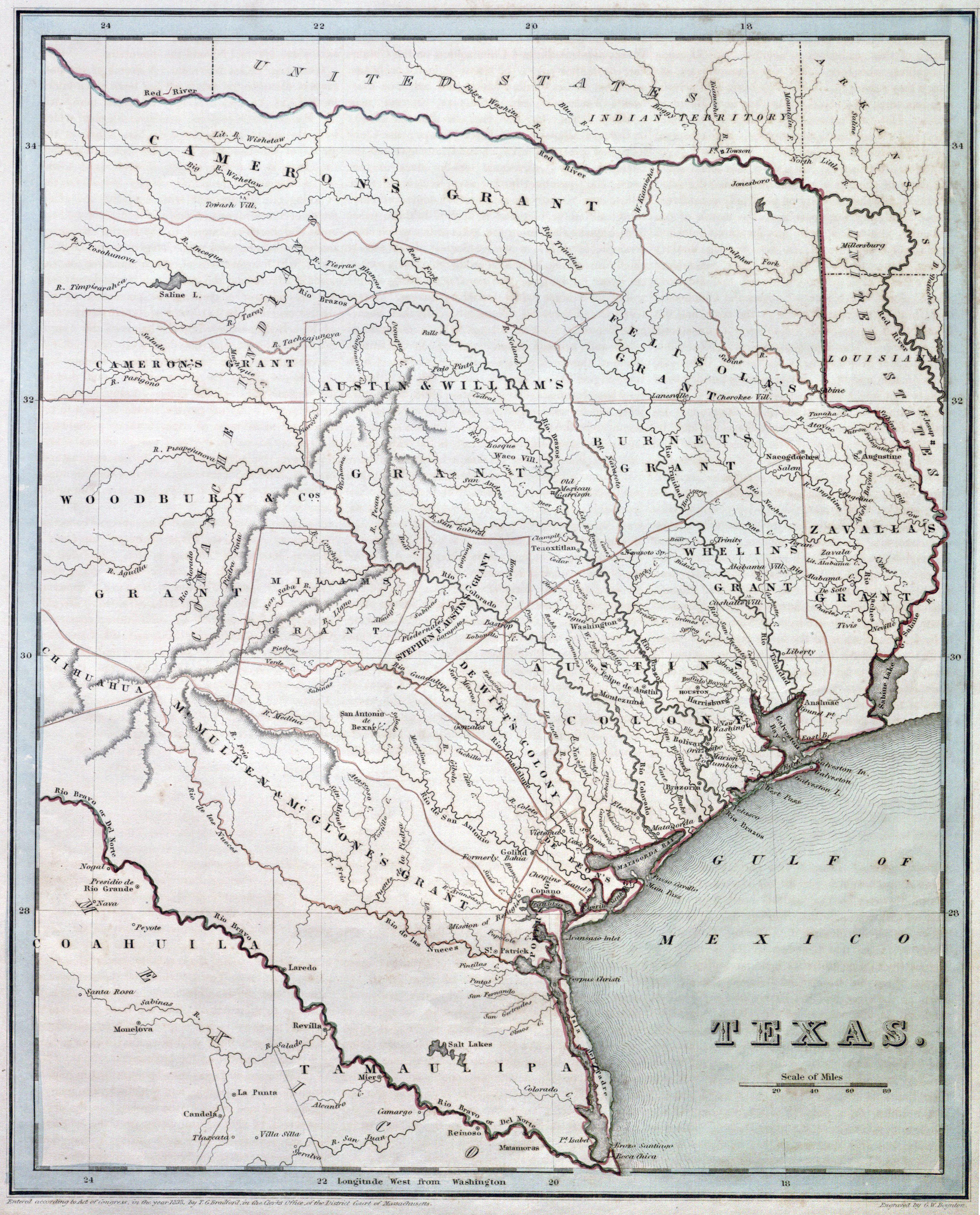
A different version of Bradford's 1838 map, showing the Rio Grande as Texas's southern boundary

- January 1 - The Texas Treasury continues to struggle with hyperinflation as the value of the printed "Star Money" promissory notes falls below par with U.S. currency.
- January 3 - President Sam Houston writes to the Texas Senate, urging them to maintain peaceful trade policies with the border tribes rather than funding aggressive militia campaigns.
- January 12 - The Supreme Court of the Republic of Texas, led by Chief Justice James Collinsworth, holds its scheduled annual meeting in the capital city of Houston to organize the nascent judicial circuits.
- January 20 - A large raiding party of Lipan Apaches strikes near the headwaters of the San Antonio River, stealing horse herds from local Tejanos and triggering a pursuit by local volunteers.
- February 1 - President Houston issues a formal diplomatic directive to Texas commissioners, instructing them to establish official boundary lines with the Caddo and Cherokee nations in East Texas to prevent white squatters from encroaching on tribal hunting grounds.
- February 15 - Heavy winter rains render the lowlands around Buffalo Bayou completely impassable, isolating the capital city from incoming supply wagons for nearly two weeks.
- February 24 - Texas Ranger Captain John Coffee "Jack" Hays leads a small detachment out of San Antonio to scout for Comanche movements along the Medina River, marking the beginning of his prominent role in frontier defense.
- March 3 - Celebrations are held in the capital to mark the one-year anniversary of official recognition by the United States.
- March 10 - General Vicente Córdova, a prominent citizen of Nacogdoches who retained his loyalty to Mexico, secretly begins organizing disaffected local Tejano residents and reaching out to Cherokee leaders to plan an armed uprising against Anglo authority.
- March 20 - The Texas Navy's lack of operational vessels leaves the Gulf Coast completely unguarded, forcing the government to consider contracting privateers to monitor Mexican maritime movements.
- April 9 - The Second Congress of the Republic of Texas reconvenes for its adjourned session in Houston. Financial reform and frontier defense dominate the legislative agenda.
- April 16 - Major General Thomas J. Rusk warns the Texas War Department that agents from Mexico City are actively attempting to recruit East Texas Indian tribes to launch a coordinated assault along the frontier.
- April 25 - In Washington, D.C., Texas Plenipotentiary Memucan Hunt Jr. signs a formal boundary convention with U.S. Secretary of State John Forsyth to map and establish the official international border along the Sabine River.
- May 1 - The Texas Congress passes a comprehensive joint resolution authorizing the printing of an additional $1 million in promissory notes, despite warnings that the move will further devalue the national currency.
- May 15 - A bloody skirmish occurs near the Trinity River when a survey party is ambushed by a band of hostile Kickapoos; three surveyors are killed, prompting a halt to land allocations in the district.
- May 24 - President Houston signs an act officially incorporating the town of Galveston, recognizing its growing strategic importance as the primary maritime port of entry for the Republic.
- June 3 - A severe outbreak of yellow fever is officially documented in Galveston, causing merchants to flee inland and disrupting shipping schedules.
- June 12 - Following months of deadlocked negotiations, the U.S. Congress formally rejects a renewed Texas petition for annexation, forcing Texas politicians to once again look toward European alliances for long-term survival.
- June 22 - The Second Texas Congress formally adjourns its final session, leaving the country deeply in debt and heavily divided over President Houston's pacifist Native American policies.
- July 4 - Civil leadership in the capital organizes a massive public dinner and ball to commemorate Independence Day, with political speeches heavily focused on the upcoming presidential election.
- July 11 - James Collinsworth, Chief Justice of the Supreme Court and a leading candidate for vice president, dies after drowning in Galveston Bay under mysterious circumstances, later suspected to be suicide.
- July 20 - Peter Grayson, another prominent political figure and Sam Houston’s hand-picked candidate to succeed him as president, dies of a self-inflicted gunshot wound in Tennessee while traveling, throwing the constitutionalist political faction into total chaos.
- August 4 - A search party looking for a stolen horse herd near Nacogdoches is fired upon by an armed group of Tejanos, revealing the existence of a massive, hidden encampment.
- August 7 - Vicente Córdova formally mobilizes a force of over 100 armed Tejanos and issues a signed proclamation refusing to recognize the sovereignty of the Republic of Texas.
- August 10 - The Córdova Rebellion erupts near Nacogdoches. Córdova moves his command to a fortified position on the Angelina River, where he is joined by roughly 300 Cherokee, Kickapoo, and Biloxi warriors.
- August 12 - President Sam Houston, who happened to be visiting Nacogdoches at the time, issues an emergency executive proclamation ordering the rebels to disperse peacefully and return to their homes.
- August 14 - General Thomas J. Rusk mobilizes the local Texas Militia and begins a rapid march toward the rebel encampment.
- August 15 - Sensing they are outnumbered by Rusk's arriving militia, Córdova avoids a pitched battle and retreats with his core followers into the dense pine woods toward the Cherokee villages, temporarily breaking up the unified rebel force.
- September 3 - Denied the ability to run for consecutive terms by the Texas Constitution, Sam Houston steps aside. Nationalist leader Mirabeau B. Lamar overwhelmingly wins the presidency in a landslide following the tragic deaths of his opponents, Grayson and Collinsworth. David G. Burnet is elected vice president.
- September 10 - Armed bands of Kickapoo and Cherokee warriors continue low-level guerrilla raiding against isolated farms in East Texas, keeping the regional militia on constant alert.
- September 20 - Surveyors attempting to mark land boundaries near the Leon River are attacked by a Comanche war party, resulting in the deaths of two surveyors and further freezing western settlement expansion.
- October 5 - The Killough massacre. In the largest single native raid in East Texas history, a band of Cherokee and allied native irregulars attacks the extended Killough family settlement near modern-day Jacksonville. Eighteen settlers are killed, scalped, or carried away into captivity.
- October 12 - General Thomas J. Rusk arrives at the site of the Killough Massacre with an emergency force of 200 mounted volunteers, swearing vengeance against the tribes responsible.
- October 16 - Rusk’s scouts locate a combined force of Córdova's rebels and Kickapoo warriors near a village in modern Anderson County. Rusk launches a furious afternoon assault, routing the enemy force, killing 11 warriors, and forcing Córdova to flee westward toward the Rio Grande.
- November 5 - The Third Congress of the Republic of Texas formally assembles in Houston for its first regular session. The political dynamic shifts decisively against President Houston’s outgoing administration.
- November 9 - President Houston delivers his final annual message to Congress, fiercely defending his economic restraint and warning that an aggressive war against the native tribes will plunge the Republic into absolute financial ruin.
- November 20 - Congress creates a select committee to locate a permanent national capital site along the western frontier, explicitly looking to move the government away from the swampy, Houston-centric coastal influence.
- December 5 - Major General Rusk leads a small force across the international border into United States territory near Caddo Lake to disarm a band of Caddo Indians who had been raiding Texas settlements, causing a sharp diplomatic dispute with U.S. authorities.
- December 10 - Mirabeau B. Lamar is formally sworn in as the second constitutional President of the Republic of Texas. In a radical, two-hour inaugural address, Lamar outlines his aggressive agenda: the total eradication or expulsion of all hostile Indian tribes, the creation of a massive public education system, and the projection of Texas as a dominant independent empire.
- December 21 - Acting swiftly on President Lamar's directives, the Texas Congress passes an emergency bill appropriating $300,000 specifically for frontier defense, authorizing the raising of a formal regiment of regular cavalry to replace the reliance on local militia.
- December 29 - President Lamar appoints a permanent commission to survey and purchase land for the new frontier capital, setting the stage for the creation of Austin in the coming year.

== 1839 ==
- January 1 - The Third Texas Congress reviews the catastrophic depreciation of national "Redback" currency, which has fallen to roughly 37 cents on the U.S. dollar.
- January 10 - Congress passes an act establishing a permanent, systemized structure for the Texas Militia, organizing the Republic into four distinct military districts.
- January 14 - The Texas Congress appointed to select a permanent seat of government along the frontier submits its formal report to President Mirabeau B. Lamar, passing over La Grange in favor of a site on the Colorado River (Texas).
- January 16 - The Texas Senate passes a strategic naval bill authorizing the treasury to purchase captured Mexican vessels from French naval officers who had seized them during the Pastry War, laying the groundwork for the Second Texas Navy.
- January 19 - President Lamar signs the legislative act officially approving the tiny frontier hamlet of Waterloo on the Colorado River as the permanent capital of the Republic, explicitly ordering it to be renamed Austin in honor of Stephen F. Austin.
- January 23 - Congress passes the historic Education Act of 1839, setting aside nearly 18,000 acres of public land for the future endowment of two major universities and allocating three leagues of land per county to fund primary public schools, earning Mirabeau B. Lamar the historical title "Father of Texas Education."
- January 25 - The Lone Star Flag is Adopted: President Mirabeau B. Lamar signs into law the bill establishing the official national flag of the Republic of Texas: a blue vertical stripe with a single white star, and two horizontal stripes of white and red. This remains the Texas state flag today.
- January 26 - Congress officially passes the Homestead Act of 1839, a landmark piece of protective legislation that exempts a citizen's primary home, tools, and farming implements from seizure for debt foreclosure.
- February 1 - President Mirabeau B. Lamar issues an executive directive appointing Edwin Waller as the official government agent in charge of surveying the new capital of Austin and supervising the construction of public buildings.
- February 14 - News reaches the capital of a brutal skirmish along the western frontier where Texas Rangers clashed with a Comanche scouting party near the San Saba River.
- February 20 - The newly commissioned Texas Navy officially begins organizing its leadership structure, appointing Edwin Ward Moore as post-captain and commander-in-chief of the fleet.
- February 25 - The Battle of Brushy Creek. Near modern-day Taylor, Texas Rangers under Jacob Burleson ambush a retreating band of Comanches who had raided a settlement. Burleson is killed; Colonel Edward Burleson mobilizes a reinforcing company to strike back, driving the raiders into the hills.
- February 28 - General José de Urrea’s federalist forces in northern Mexico attempt to recruit Texan mercenaries for their internal rebellion against the centralist government, highlighting the complex border dynamics of the era.
- March 2 - Public celebrations are held across the Republic to observe the third anniversary of the signing of the Texas Declaration of Independence.
- March 14 - Agent Edwin Waller departs for Waterloo with an advance guard of surveyors, carpenters, and laborers, arriving by late March to begin physically laying out the grid of Austin despite the constant threat of native attack.
- March 29 - An uprising of Nacogdoches-area Tejanos who did not support independence from Mexico culminated in the Córdova Rebellion and its ultimate defeat at Battleground Prairie in Guadalupe County.
- April 3 - The government-contracted steamship Zavala, the first war steamer purchased for the Second Texas Navy, arrives at Galveston and undergoes immediate outfitting for military operations.
- April 15 - President Mirabeau B. Lamar shakes up his cabinet, appointing Albert Sidney Johnston as Secretary of War to oversee the execution of his aggressive frontier defense policies.
- April 26 - Chief Bowles of the Cherokee writes an anxious letter to Texas authorities, reaffirming his desire for peace but demanding that white surveyors stop cutting lines through his people's farming villages.
- May 14 - Manuel Flores, a secret military agent for the Mexican government, is intercepted and killed by a company of Texas Rangers under Lieutenant James O. Rice near the San Gabriel River.
- May 15 - Rangers searching Flores's baggage discover official documents and personal diaries from the Mexican War Department. The papers explicitly reveal a covert Mexican plot to arm the Cherokee and other East Texas tribes to launch a massive, coordinated insurrection against the Republic in exchange for formal land titles from Mexico City.
- May 20 - Armed with the captured Flores documents as definitive proof of treason, President Mirabeau B. Lamar formally declares that the Cherokee have forfeited any moral or legal claim to their lands in Texas. He orders the immediate mobilization of the Texas Regular Army and Militia under Generals Thomas J. Rusk and Kelsey Douglass to execute an "exterminating war" if the tribes refuse to leave.
- June 3 - Secretary of War Albert Sidney Johnston dispatches a formal ultimatum to Chief Bowles. The document offers to pay the Cherokee for their crops and physical improvements, but demands their immediate, total disarmament and forced evacuation across the Red River into U.S. Indian Territory.
- June 15 - Chief Bowles meets with Texas peace commissioners at his village. He explicitly states that while he desires peace and knows his people cannot defeat the Texans in a prolonged war, his young warriors will fight rather than be driven from their homes under armed guard.
- June 22 - General Kelsey Douglass camps his force of roughly 500 regular troops and volunteer militia along the Angelina River, directly adjacent to the Cherokee settlements, as negotiations reach a complete deadlock over the terms of the armed military escort.
- July 12 - General Douglass sends a final peace commission to Chief Bowles’s camp. Bowles requests another 48 hours to consult his headmen, a tactical move designed to allow his elderly women and children to begin evacuating northward.
- July 14 - The Texan forces refuse further delays and begin an aggressive advance. Chief Bowles orders his main town evacuated, and the Cherokee warriors fall back into defensive positions.
- July 15 - Battle of the Neches (Day 1): At dusk, Douglass’s army intercepts the Cherokee and their allies (Kickapoos, Delawares, and Shawnees) a few miles west of modern-day Tyler. A sharp, erratic firefight breaks out. The Texans drive the Indians back into a nearby ravine as night falls; three Texans and 18 Cherokees are killed.
- July 16 - Battle of the Neches (Day 2): Colonel Edward Burleson’s and General Thomas J. Rusk’s regiments reinforce the Texan line. They track the retreating Cherokee to the headwaters of the Neches River in modern Van Zandt County. The Cherokee launch an assault from the river bottom, but the Texans charge across open terrain, completely overwhelming the tribal lines with superior firepower. Over 100 native warriors are killed. The 83-year-old Chief Bowles enters the battle on horseback, wearing a military silk vest and a sword gifted to him years prior by Sam Houston. His horse is shot, and he is wounded in the thigh. As he sits on the battlefield attempting to surrender, Texan Captain Robert W. Smith steps forward and shoots him dead in the head.
- July 25 - Texas forces spend the final days of July systematically burning abandoned Cherokee villages and destroying standing corn crops to guarantee the tribe cannot return to East Texas. Vice President David G. Burnet and Secretary of War Albert Sidney Johnston, who both participated in the frontline fighting, return to the capital to report the total clearance of the region.
- August 5 - The public land auction in the raw capital of Austin concludes its first week, with over 300 town lots sold to eager speculators and incoming government officials.
- August 14 - Major General Thomas J. Rusk issues a formal military order detailing the redistribution of regular infantry companies to the western frontier line to block Comanche retaliation.
- August 29 - The Republic's diplomatic corps receives formal communication that Great Britain has signed a preliminary commercial treaty with Texas agents, drastically expanding the country's economic footprint in Europe.
- September 3 - A severe autumnal heatwave and drought dry up the local springs around Austin, temporarily complicating the final phases of building construction.
- September 15 - The government-contracted shipyard in Baltimore, Maryland, delivers the newly constructed 20-gun sloop-of-war Austin to Texas naval officers, providing a powerful flagship for the growing Second Texas Navy.
- September 25 - King Louis-Philippe of France formally ratifies the treaty of amity and commerce with the Republic. Minister Alphonse Dubois de Saligny is officially dispatched to Texas to establish a permanent French Legation in the new capital.
- October 1 - A massive caravan of heavily laden government wagons, carrying all the records, archives, furniture, and printing presses of the Republic of Texas, moves out of the old capital of Houston, bound for the new capital.
- October 17 - President Mirabeau B. Lamar and his executive cabinet arrive in Austin after a multi-day journey from the coast. They are greeted by a booming cannon salute and a banquet inside a crude, newly constructed frame building.
- October 24 - Government clerks unpack the national archives and officially open the doors of the raw, pine-log Departments of State, War, and Treasury along the frontier streets of Austin.
- November 11 - The Fourth Congress of the Republic of Texas formally assembles for its first session in Austin, meeting inside a temporary, stockaded capitol building designed to double as a fort in case of a Comanche raid.
- November 12 - President Mirabeau B. Lamar delivers his annual message to Congress. He boasts of the successful military expulsion of the Cherokee, requests vast new appropriations to fund the Second Texas Navy, and fiercely defends the high cost of moving the capital to the frontier as a necessary step for continental empire.
- November 25 - Congress initiates a formal investigation into the skyrocketing national debt, as the flood of printed "Redbacks" causes the currency to collapse to less than 25 cents on the dollar.
- December 5 - Reports reach Austin that a rogue multi-tribal raiding party has struck an isolated homestead just fifteen miles outside the capital city, prompting the deployment of a permanent cavalry guard around the town perimeter.
- December 21 - Congress passes a sweeping public land act, offering 320 acres of free land to any white family willing to settle on the western frontier and remain there for three consecutive years.
- December 25 - Christmas Day is celebrated in Austin with gunfire salutes, public horse racing down Congress Avenue, and heavy drinking in local canvas-roofed saloons.
- December 31 - The year concludes with the Republic of Texas physically established on its western border, politically detached from the old coastal networks, deeply bankrupt, and bracing for an inevitable clash with the Comanche Nation.

== 1840 ==
- January 1 - The Fourth Texas Congress, meeting in the new capital of Austin, debates emergency measures to halt the total collapse of the national currency, as "Redbacks" are now being traded at less than 20 cents on the U.S. dollar.
- January 10 - A delegation of three Comanche headmen arrives at the Texas military post in San Antonio de Béxar. They meet with Colonel Henry W. Karnes and express a desire to negotiate a permanent peace treaty. Karnes informs them that negotiations can only proceed if the Comanches surrender all white captives currently held by their bands.
- January 25 - Congress passes an act officially adopting the common law of England as the primary rule of decision in the Republic's courts, systematically replacing the residual Mexican civil law system.
- January 30 - President Mirabeau B. Lamar signs an act defining the boundaries of several new frontier counties, aiming to legally secure central Texas for imminent settlement despite the volatile frontier line.
- February 3 - Based on Colonel Karnes' report of the January encounter, Secretary of War Albert Sidney Johnston dispatches a secret order to Lieutenant Colonel William S. Fisher of the 1st Infantry Regiment. Fisher is ordered to march two companies of regular infantry to San Antonio to act as a hidden guard during the upcoming peace talks.
- February 5 - The Texas Congress officially passes a sweeping bankruptcy act, providing legal relief to hundreds of heavily indebted settlers flooding into the country.
- February 11 - The Fourth Texas Congress formally adjourns its regular session, leaving behind a heavily fortified but financially exhausted frontier defense framework.
- February 20 - French Minister Alphonse Dubois de Saligny arrives in Austin to establish the permanent French Legation, introducing formal European diplomatic court customs to the raw frontier capital.
- March 1 - Word reaches Austin that a major caravan of Mexican traders from Chihuahua has arrived in San Antonio under military escort, attempting to establish an illicit frontier trade network independent of Mexico City.
- March 17 - Lieutenant Colonel William S. Fisher's regular infantry companies arrive in San Antonio and quietly take up quarters inside the Alamo compound and nearby structures, awaiting the arrival of the Comanche peace delegation.
- March 19: Council House Fight. A delegation of 65 Penateka Comanches, including 12 prominent chiefs led by Muguara, enters San Antonio. They bring with them only one captive: 16-year-old Matilda Lockhart. Lockhart shows severe signs of physical abuse, her nose having been burned off to the bone. She informs Texas officials that the Comanches still hold at least 15 other white captives at their frontier camps. The chiefs are assembled inside the municipal Council House (the Juzgado). Commissioners William G. Cooke and Hugh McLeod demand the immediate release of the remaining prisoners. When Chief Muguara replies that the other captives belong to distinct bands beyond his control, the commissioners declare the chiefs hostages until the prisoners are brought in. Fisher's soldiers enter the room to secure them. The Comanche chiefs draw their knives and bows, attacking the guards. A chaotic, close-quarters gunfight erupts inside the courtroom and spills out into the public plaza. All 12 Comanche chiefs are shot dead inside the room. In the ensuing melee across the town, 35 Comanches (including women and children who picked up weapons) are killed, and 30 are taken prisoner. Seven Texans are killed, and eight are severely wounded.
- March 20 - A captured Comanche woman is given a horse and provisions and dispatched to the hills. She is instructed to inform her people that the remaining Texan prisoners will be traded one-for-one for the Comanche captives taken during the fight.
- April 3 - When news of the Council House Massacre reaches the Penateka Comanche camps, a massive wave of mourning and rage ensues. According to later captive accounts, the Comanches torturously execute virtually all their remaining white prisoners, including Mrs. John Webster and her children.
- April 12 - A small Comanche war party rides openly onto the hills overlooking San Antonio, screaming defiances and challenging the regular garrison to single combat, but the soldiers refuse to break formation.
- April 25 - Post-Captain Edwin Ward Moore moves the ships of the Second Texas Navy out of Galveston harbor, bound for the Yucatan coast to initiate naval maneuvers aimed at forcing Mexico to recognize Texas independence.
- May 1 - Reports reach the War Department that large bands of Northern Comanches are gathering near the headwaters of the Arkansas and Red rivers, hinting at a massive, unified offensive.
- May 15 - President Mirabeau B. Lamar issues an executive order suspending the operations of the General Land Office in the western districts, fearing that surveying parties will be completely wiped out by native war parties.
- May 28 - A severe storm damages several temporary frame government structures in Austin, forcing clerks to move the state records to more secure log structures.
- June 1 - Post-Captain Edwin Ward Moore signs a formal cooperative agreement with federalist rebels in Yucatan, leveraging the Second Texas Navy to protect Yucatán ports from centralist Mexican warships in exchange for direct cash subsidies to the Texas treasury. Forces gathered in San Patricio, Texas to organize the Republic of the Rio Grande expedition.
- June 15 - Severe summer heat and a persistent regional drought dry up major creeks throughout central Texas, forcing frontier cattle herds to cluster around a few primary rivers.
- June 24 - Texas Ranger Jack Hays is formally commissioned as a captain of the frontier forces, tasked with raising a permanent company of mounted scouts based out of San Antonio.
- July 4 - Independence Day passes with minimal celebration in Austin as the town remains under a state of constant alert, with rumors of a multi-tribe invasion circulating weekly.
- July 15 - General Felix Huston arrives in Austin to consult with the executive cabinet regarding the complete lack of funding for the frontline militia units.
- July 30 - Chief Buffalo Hump completes the secret mobilization of a massive war party. Composed of nearly 1,000 Comanches and Kiowas (including roughly 400-500 frontline warriors), the column slips completely undetected past the regular frontier military outposts and heads south toward the settlements.
- August 4 - Buffalo Hump’s massive column passes directly between San Antonio and Gonzales, moving with immense speed down the valley of the Guadalupe River.
- August 6 - Great Raid of 1840 (Day 1). The Comanche war party completely surprises the town of Victoria. They surround the market square, killing 15 citizens and capturing massive herds of local horses before encamping on the town outskirts.
- August 7 - Great Raid of 1840 (Day 2). The raiders move toward the coast, plundering isolated plantations along the way. Local militia units under Benjamin McCulloch begin hastily organizing a pursuit, but they are vastly outnumbered.
- August 8 - Great Raid of 1840 (Day 3). The Comanches reach the major tidewater port town of Linnville on Lavaca Bay. Most citizens successfully flee to the safety of boats anchored out in the water. The Comanches spend the entire day systematically plundering the town's massive commercial warehouses, loading thousands of horses and mules with fine silks, dynamic trade goods, and silver, before burning the entire settlement to the ground.
- August 10 - Heavily laden with plunder and driving a herd of over 2,000 stolen horses, Buffalo Hump’s column begins a leisurely retreat back toward the northern hills.
- August 12: Battle of Plum Creek. A combined Texan force of roughly 200 volunteer militia and Texas Rangers under General Felix Huston, Colonel Edward Burleson, and Captain Jack Hays, reinforced by 13 Tonkawa scouts under Chief Placido, intercepts the Comanches near modern-day Lockhart. Rather than fleeing, the Comanches attempt to defend their massive train of stolen goods, with several warriors riding across the lines in ceremonial top hats and fine silks taken from Linnville. General Huston orders a decisive, unified charge. The Texans break the Comanche lines, turning the engagement into a running, 15-mile rout through the woods. Over 80 Comanche warriors are killed; the Texans recover almost all the stolen livestock and goods, losing only one volunteer.
- September 5 - Following the victory at Plum Creek, President Mirabeau B. Lamar authorizes a massive, aggressive retaliatory expedition directly into the heart of the Comanche stronghold along the upper Colorado River.
- September 15 - Great Britain’s diplomatic corps formally signs a treaty of navigation and commerce with Texas commissioners in London, delivering a massive blow to Mexican diplomatic efforts to isolate the Republic.
- September 22 - Colonel John H. Moore begins assembling a force of 90 Texas volunteers and 12 Lipan Apache scouts at Austin to launch the offensive into the northern hills.
- October 1 - Colonel Moore’s expeditionary force moves out of the settlements, marching north along the Colorado River into uncharted tribal territory.
- October 23 - Moore’s Apache scouts locate a massive, hidden Penateka Comanche village of 60 lodges along the Red Fork of the Colorado River (near modern-day Colorado City, Texas).
- October 24 - Battle of Red Fork. At dawn, Moore launches a devastating, surprise attack on the sleeping village. The regular volunteers sweep through the lodges with pistols and rifles. The village is completely destroyed; 140 Comanches are killed on the field, and 34 are taken prisoner, effectively crippling the immediate military leadership of the Penateka band. Moore returns to the settlements without a single fatality.
- November 2 - The Fifth Congress of the Republic of Texas formally assembles for its regular session in Austin.
- November 4 - President Mirabeau B. Lamar delivers a defiant annual message to Congress. He extols the crushing military victories at Plum Creek and the Red Fork, but is forced to admit that the national treasury is completely dry, with the public debt now exceeding $5 million.
- November 14 - A major diplomatic crisis occurs in Austin when a local hotel keeper's pigs break into the stables of French Minister Dubois de Saligny and destroy his private corn stores, initiating the highly publicized, petty diplomatic dispute known as the Pig War.
- November 28 - Angered by the government's handling of the pig dispute and the general lack of refinement in the capital, Dubois de Saligny threatens to break off diplomatic relations and recommend that France deny a critical $5 million loan to the Republic.
- December 5 - The Texas Senate begins a bitter debate over a bill to completely dismantle the regular army and rely entirely on local Ranger companies to save the nation from total financial bankruptcy.
- December 12 - The Texas Navy fleet under Post-Captain Edwin Ward Moore returns to Galveston for repairs after a successful cruise, having successfully destabilized Mexican maritime shipping along the Gulf coast.
- December 25 - Christmas Day is marked by severe freezing weather in Austin, keeping the members of Congress confined to their drafty boarding houses.
- December 31 - The year closes with the Comanche threat heavily suppressed along the immediate settlement lines, but the Republic of Texas faces absolute fiscal insolvency as its paper currency loses virtually all purchasing power.

== 1841 ==
John Arrowsmith's 1841 Map of Texas

- January 2 - The Fifth Texas Congress, sitting in Austin, opens intense debate on a bill to legally dismantle the regular army, citing an empty treasury and the near-total worthlessness of "Redback" paper currency.
- January 12 - The Supreme Court of the Republic of Texas opens its annual term in Austin. Due to the dangerous frontier conditions surrounding the capital, several district judges fail to arrive on time, delaying the docket.
- January 18 - Diplomatic dispatches from London confirm that Great Britain and Texas have officially exchanged ratifications of their treaty of amity and commerce, providing a brief political boost to the Lamar administration.
- January 28 - Congress passes a landmark frontier act officially abolishing the regular army of the Republic. Frontier defense is legally shifted entirely to local, volunteer Texas Ranger companies and seasonal militia call-ups to slash national expenditures.
- February 1 - President Mirabeau B. Lamar signs an act authorizing the printing of an additional $150,000 in treasury notes to cover immediate civil service salaries, despite severe depreciation.
- February 4 - Congress passes the Franco-Texian Bill, a highly controversial measure backed by French Minister Alphonse Dubois de Saligny that would grant a French company millions of acres of western land in exchange for establishing twenty fortified frontier outposts and establishing 8,000 French families to settle in Texas.
- February 5 - President Lamar signs a revised revenue bill implementing strict ad valorem taxes on land, slaves, and luxury goods to generate hard currency.
- February 9 - The Fifth Texas Congress formally adjourns. Members hastily leave the exposed capital due to freezing winter weather and persistent rumors of Comanche tracking parties in the immediate vicinity.
- February 20 - The French Legation in Austin becomes the center of a sharp domestic scandal when Dubois de Saligny violently breaks off communication with the Texas cabinet over the ongoing "Pig War" dispute with local innkeeper Richard Bullock.
- March 2 - Public gatherings observe the fifth anniversary of Texas independence, though the celebrations are muted by a severe economic depression.
- March 15 - Following a complete refusal by the Texas government to arrest Richard Bullock for insulting him, French Minister Dubois de Saligny officially packs his diplomatic baggage and abandons Austin, moving to New Orleans and effectively freezing French financial loans to the Republic.
- March 24 - Post-Captain Edwin Ward Moore sails the flagship Austin into Galveston harbor to refit, reporting that while the alliance with Yucatán federalists keeps the fleet funded, Mexico refuses to engage in open naval peace talks.
- April 4 - President Mirabeau B. Lamar begins drafting secret executive orders to organize a massive commercial and military expedition to Santa Fe, completely bypassing the Texas Congress, which had explicitly refused to fund or authorize the venture.
- April 15 - Lamar issues a public proclamation addressed directly to the citizens of Santa Fe (New Mexico), falsely assuring them that the expedition is a peaceful trade mission designed to offer them the benefits of Texas freedom and constitutional governance.
- April 26 - The War Department begins issuing calls for volunteers, merchants, and teamsters to assemble at Kenner's plantation near Austin to form the vanguard of the Santa Fe Expedition.
- May 1 - General Hugh McLeod is officially appointed by President Mirabeau B. Lamar to take military command of the Santa Fe Pioneers, a force tasked with guarding the massive merchant wagon train.
- May 14 - The Texas Treasury officially reports that the public debt has climbed past $6 million, while "Redbacks" collapse further, trading at less than 12 cents on the U.S. dollar.
- May 22 - Outraged by Lamar's executive overreach, former President Sam Houston launches his official campaign to reclaim the presidency, centering his platform on strict fiscal retrenchment, peace with the Indian tribes, and the relocation of the capital away from Austin.
- June 15 - President Lamar arrives at the military encampment outside Austin to personally review the assembled Santa Fe Pioneers and deliver a formal farewell address.
- June 19 - Under the command of General McLeod, the Texan Santa Fe Expedition officially moves out. The column consists of 321 men, including 21 pieces of heavy artillery, 24 commercial wagons packed with $200,000 worth of dry goods, and a massive herd of cattle for provisions. Their goal is to march over 1,000 miles across uncharted territory to assert Texas sovereignty over New Mexico.
- June 24 - The expedition reaches the Brazos River. Due to a near-total lack of experienced guides, inaccurate maps, and heavy summer heat, the heavy wagons begin bogging down in the muddy river bottoms, severely delaying their daily march.
- July 4 - Trapped in the dense thickets of the Cross Timbers, the Santa Fe Pioneers celebrate Independence Day with reduced rations, as their beef cattle herds begin to thin out from poor grazing.
- July 15 - Captain Jack Hays and a company of 30 Texas Rangers engage a notable band of Comanches near the Frio River, utilizing the new five-shot Colt Paterson revolvers for the first time to decisively repel a mounted charge.
- July 28 - Lost on the arid plains of West Texas, General McLeod is forced to halt the main Santa Fe column for two days along the Wichita River to send out desperate scouting parties in search of a viable wagon route up the Caprock escarpment.
- August 5 - Scurvy, intense dehydration, and near-starvation begin to break out among the Santa Fe Pioneers. Hostile Kiowa and Comanche raiders begin harassing the edges of the column, killing several stragglers and driving off draft mules.
- August 11 - General McLeod reaches the foot of the Llano Estacado. Recognizing that the main body cannot survive much longer without water, he makes a critical command decision: he splits his force, sending an advance guard of 99 mounted men under Captain John C. Cooke ahead to locate New Mexican settlements, while the heavy wagons remain behind.
- August 30 - Driven to near madness by thirst and eating their own horses, the advance guard of the expedition finally scales the Caprock and makes contact with sheep herders near the New Mexican border.
- September 4 - The citizens of Texas turn out in massive numbers to repudiate the Lamar administration. Sam Houston wins the presidency in a landslide victory over David G. Burnet. Edward Burleson is elected vice president.
- September 12 - New Mexico Governor Manuel Armijo receives definitive word from frontier scouts regarding the approaching, emaciated Texan column. He immediately mobilizes the regular Mexican militia and issues a regional counter-invasion proclamation.
- September 17 - Captain Cooke's advance detachment is completely surrounded at Anton Chico by an overwhelming force of Mexican regulars under Captain Dámaso Salazar. Promised honorable treatment as merchants by Texan turncoat William P. Lewis, the starving Texans surrender their weapons without firing a shot.
- September 22 - Governor Armijo arrives on the scene, orders the Texan prisoners stripped of their boots and coats, and commands them to be immediately marched south under armed guard toward the interior of Mexico.
- October 5 - Completely unaware that the advance guard has been captured, General McLeod and the remaining 200 starving members of the main wagon train arrive at Laguna Colorada, near modern-day Tucumcari, New Mexico. They are instantly surrounded by Armijo's full army. Broken by disease and hunger, McLeod formally signs articles of unconditional surrender.
- October 12 - Governor Armijo confiscates the entire $200,000 merchant cargo and all Texas artillery pieces, distributing the spoils among his officers.
- October 17 - The entire combined body of over 300 Texan prisoners is formed into columns and forced onto a brutal, 2,000-mile march down the El Camino Real toward Perote Prison in Veracruz. Along the way, Captain Salazar systematically executes any prisoner who falls out of formation due to exhaustion or illness.
- November 1 - The Sixth Congress of the Republic of Texas formally assembles for its first session in Austin. The atmosphere is tense as the capital remains completely missing any official news regarding the fate of the Santa Fe Expedition.
- November 10 - Outgoing President Lamar delivers his final annual message to Congress, fiercely defending his record and refusing to apologize for the high national debt or his high cost frontier campaigns.
- November 20 - First unconfirmed rumors of the total disaster and surrender at Santa Fe reach the Texas coast via merchant vessels arriving from New Orleans, sparking immediate public outrage and widespread mourning.
- December 13 - Sam Houston is formally sworn in as President of the Republic of Texas in Austin. In a stark, blunt inaugural address, Houston declares that the nation is on the verge of absolute ruin, stating: "We are not only deep in debt, but we are penniless." He demands an immediate end to all offensive military expeditions, the total cessation of paper money printing, and a rapid return to strict constitutional economy.
- December 21 - President Houston signs an emergency bill slashing the salaries of all civil servants, including his own, by over 50 percent to prevent a total shutdown of the executive departments.
- December 31 - The year closes with the Republic of Texas locked in a profound constitutional crisis, its treasury completely empty, its citizens mourning the mass imprisonment of the Santa Fe Pioneers, and an emboldened Mexico preparing to retaliate along the Rio Grande.

== 1842 ==
- January 1 - President Sam Houston coordinates with the Sixth Texas Congress in Austin to legally nullify all active contracts for the Second Texas Navy, attempting to force Post-Captain Edwin Ward Moore to return the fleet to Galveston to cut national expenditures.
- January 5 - Congress passes an emergency currency act creating "Exchequer Bills", new treasury notes backed directly by customs revenues, and decrees that devalued "Redbacks" will no longer be accepted for government taxes.
- January 12 - The Supreme Court of the Republic of Texas opens its annual session. Due to the total breakdown of the national economy, the court focuses heavily on processing property foreclosures and debt appeals.
- January 25 - News is officially verified in Austin that the captured survivors of the Texan Santa Fe Expedition are being held in chains at Perote Prison, igniting calls for immediate war.
- February 1 - President Houston signs an act drastically reducing the size of the civil service and capping executive department budgets to prevent a complete collapse of government operations.
- February 5 - Congress passes a frontier defense bill authorizing the formation of localized, temporary companies of mounted volunteers, specifically relying on the Texas Rangers under Jack Hays to patrol the vulnerable southern frontier.
- February 11 - The Sixth Texas Congress formally adjourns. Members quickly evacuate Austin, leaving the frontier capital minimally populated due to freezing weather and lack of provisions.
- February 24 - Mexican General Rafael Vásquez quietly crosses the Rio Grande with a highly mobile force of roughly 700 regular soldiers, bypassing the primary roads to execute a surprise march into Texas territory.
- March 5 - General Rafael Vásquez’s vanguard suddenly appears outside San Antonio de Béxar. Outnumbered and lacking artillery, Captain Jack Hays and the local militia evacuate the town. Vásquez occupies the city, raises the Mexican centralist flag, demands municipal capitulation, and declares Mexican sovereignty re-established.
- March 7 - After a symbolic 48-hour occupation to demonstrate Texas's total vulnerability, General Rafael Vásquez completely evacuates San Antonio, marching his forces rapidly back toward the Rio Grande with local plunder.
- March 10 - News of the capture of San Antonio reaches Austin, triggering a massive domestic panic. Believing a massive, full-scale invasion army is right behind Vásquez, hundreds of citizens pack their wagons and flee eastward.
- March 15 - Citing Austin’s total exposure to enemy cavalry, President Sam Houston officially declares the capital unsafe. He issues an executive order commanding the removal of the national archives to the town of Houston.
- March 16 - The citizens remaining in Austin form a "Committee of Safety." Viewing Houston's order as a political ploy to permanently strip Austin of its capital status, they seize the national records, pack them into secure boxes, and place them under an armed civilian guard, initiating the Texas Archive War.
- April 2 - President Houston arrives in the town of Houston and establishes temporary executive offices, while the physical state records remain held hostage under guard by Austin citizens.
- April 12 - A mass assembly of over 3,000 Texas militia volunteers gathers along the Guadalupe River, demanding that the president authorize an immediate counter-invasion of Mexico. Houston refuses, recognizing the country lacks ammunition, rations, and funding.
- April 26 - Santa Anna releases a small group of Anglo-American prisoners from Mexico City as a diplomatic maneuver, but re-affirms his public stance that Texas remains a rebellious province that will be systematically re-conquered.
- May 1 - General James Davis is appointed by President Houston to take command of the volatile volunteer forces encamped near the coast, tasked with enforcing strict military discipline among men eager to march south.
- May 14 - Post-Captain Edwin Ward Moore openly defies Houston’s direct orders to return to port, maintaining his fleet along the Yucatan coast and utilizing local rebel funds to keep the Second Texas Navy operational.
- May 28 - Heavy spring floods along the Brazos and Colorado rivers completely disrupt civilian communications, isolates frontier settlements, and temporarily halts military troop movements.
- June 7 - A sharp skirmish occurs near Lipantitlán on the Nueces River. A small detachment of Texas volunteers under General Davis repels a probing attack by Mexican cavalry irregulars under Daníel Tolsá.
- June 15 - President Houston issues an official call for a special session of Congress to assemble in Houston in July to address the ongoing military threat along the Rio Grande.
- June 27 - Reports from frontier scouts indicate that regular Mexican forces are actively rebuilding supply depots along the south bank of the Rio Grande near Matamoros, hinting at a second summer offensive.
- July 4 - Independence Day is observed in the temporary capital of Houston with aggressive political speeches denouncing Sam Houston's defensive "pacifist" policies and demanding an offensive war against Mexico.
- July 23 - The special session of the Sixth Texas Congress formally opens in Houston. Both houses immediately form joint committees to draft a declaration of war against Mexico, completely ignoring the president's warnings regarding financial insolvency.
- July 30 - Congress passes a grandiloquent war bill, authorizing the recruitment of an offensive army and proposing to pay for the campaign by selling millions of acres of unappropriated public land in West Texas. Sam Houston promptly pockets the bill, executing a veto.
- August 4 - President Sam Houston delivers a blunt veto message to Congress, explicitly stating that printing land scrip to fund an aggressive foreign war is an economic delusion that will ruin what remains of Texas's international credit.
- August 11 - Frustrated by the political deadlock, the special session of Congress adjourns, leaving national defense entirely in the hands of the executive administration and local Ranger units.
- August 25 - Mexican General Adrián Woll completes the secret mobilization of a highly disciplined, multi-branch invasion force of 1,400 regular troops, including regular cavalry, infantry, and artillery, and begins a rapid march toward San Antonio.
- September 11 - Under cover of a heavy autumn fog, General Adrián Woll's army completely surrounds San Antonio. The local district court is in session; after a brief defense of the public square by 50 Anglo citizens, the entire body, including the presiding judge, lawyers, and clerks, are taken prisoner.
- September 17 - Armed militia volunteers from the surrounding counties rapidly assemble under the command of Colonel Mathew Caldwell at Seguin, tracking Woll's movements.
- September 18 - Battle of Salado Creek and the Dawson Massacre. Colonel Mathew Caldwell sets up a concealed defensive line along Salado Creek. Captain Jack Hays and a company of Texas Rangers ride directly into San Antonio, lure Woll's regular cavalry into a furious pursuit, and pull them into Caldwell's ambush. The Texans decisively repel repeated Mexican infantry and cavalry charges, killing roughly 60 Mexican regulars while losing only one volunteer. Concurrently, a reinforcing company of 53 Fayette County volunteers under Captain Nicolas Dawson attempts to reach Caldwell's lines. They are intercepted in an open prairie by Woll's regular cavalry and artillery. Dawson's men are cut off and blasted with grapeshot. Dawson is killed; 36 Texans are slain on the field, 15 are captured, and only two escape.
- September 20 - Recognizing that Texan numbers are swelling daily, General Adrián Woll completely evacuates San Antonio, marching south toward the Rio Grande with his prisoners, including the captured court officials.
- October 3 - In response to the Woll invasion, President Sam Houston issues an official directive appointing General Alexander Somervell to take supreme command of all mobilized volunteer forces assembling at San Antonio. He explicitly instructs him to march to the Rio Grande to secure the border, but strictly warns him not to cross the river unless military success is guaranteed.
- October 15 - Over 700 highly volatile, unprincipled volunteers gather at San Antonio, furious over the Dawson Massacre and openly demanding to march directly onto Monterrey and Mexico City.
- October 24 - General Somervell spends the final weeks of October attempting to organize the rowdy volunteer regiments into a structured brigade, facing severe insubordination from local officers who distrust his caution.
- November 14 - The Third Regular Session of the Sixth Congress opens in the temporary capital of Houston, immediately launching an investigation into the logistical failures of the frontier defense system.
- November 25 - Somervell Expedition. General Somervell finally moves his army of roughly 750 men out of San Antonio, marching southwest through torrential late-autumn rains toward the Mexican border towns along the Rio Grande.
- December 8 - Somervell’s freezing, muddy army arrives on the north bank of the Rio Grande opposite the town of Nuevo Laredo. The Texans occupy and plunder the town despite direct orders from Somervell to respect civilian property.
- December 10 - Somervell moves his forces downriver and captures the small Mexican hamlet of Guerrero, demanding cash and provisions from the local alcade.
- December 19 - Recognizing that his force is entirely disorganized, completely out of rations, and facing a massive concentration of regular Mexican troops under General Pedro de Ampudia, General Alexander Somervell issues a formal command to abort the campaign, ordering all units to immediately disband and return to San Antonio.
- December 20 - A major mutiny fractures the army. While Somervell and roughly 200 loyal men obey the order and march home, five captains and 304 insubordinate volunteers flatly refuse to abandon the fight. They elect William S. Fisher as their commander, seize local barges, cross the Rio Grande, and march directly onto the fortified town of Mier.
- December 23 - Fisher's rogue force enters Mier, captures the local plaza, and demands a massive shipment of supplies and money from the municipal leadership.
- December 25 - Mier Expedition. General Pedro de Ampudia's regular army reinforces the town under cover of darkness. A brutal, street-by-street, house-by-house battle erupts in a blinding rainstorm. The Texans utilize their rifles from the rooftops to kill over 200 Mexican regulars, but are completely cut off from water and running out of ammunition.
- December 26 - Tricked by Ampudia into believing they face an overwhelming force of several thousand troops, William S. Fisher and 260 surviving Texans formally sign articles of capitulation, surrendering as rogue prisoners of war.
- December 29 - Texas Archive War. Simultaneously in Austin, President Houston sends a secret detachment of 20 men under Captain Thomas Smith to quietly load the national archives into three wagons at night.
- December 30 - At dawn, Austin citizens discover the archive removal in progress. Led by innkeeper Angelina Eberly, the citizens rush to a loaded six-pounder cannon positioned on Congress Avenue. Eberly personally fires the cannon at the government building, punching holes through the roof. Smith's men flee eastward with the wagons.
- December 31 - An armed civilian posse from Austin overtakes Smith's detachment at Kinney's Fort along Brushy Creek. At gunpoint, the posse forces the return of the records, triumphantly unloading the boxes back in Austin. The year concludes with the national archives firmly secured by an armed citizenry, while the captured survivors of the Mier Expedition begin a grueling trek into the interior of Mexico.

== 1843 ==
- January 1 - In Austin, the national archives remain under armed civilian guard following the Archive War, while the executive departments operate out of Washington-on-the-Brazos.
- January 9 - The captured Mier prisoners, numbering over 240 men under heavy military guard, begin their long overland march from Matamoros toward the interior of Mexico.
- January 16 - President Sam Houston signs a congressional bill officially authorizing the appointment of specialized Indian agents to venture onto the western plains and invite hostile tribal chiefs to a grand peace council.
- January 25 - The Seventh Texas Congress, sitting in its temporary seat at Washington-on-the-Brazos, passes an act legally reducing the national tariff rates on essential imported food and tools to stimulate trade.
- February 2 - The Mier prisoners arrive at the small hacienda of El Salado, located south of Saltillo, completely exhausted and suffering from exposure.
- February 11 - Led by Captain Ewen Cameron and Thomas Green, the Mier prisoners execute a daring, pre-dawn mutiny at Llanos el Salado. They overpower their Mexican infantry guards, seize dozens of muskets and horses, and flee into the arid mountains to the north.
- February 15 - Lost in the desert mountains without water, the escaped Texans begin fracturing into small groups, killing their horses for blood, and succumbing to extreme dehydration.
- February 24 - Mexican cavalry detachments systematically track down and recapture the starving, emaciated Texans in the mountains, re-shackling them and marching them back to Llanos el Salado.
- March 1 - News of the successful mass escape and subsequent recapture of the Mier men reaches Santa Anna in Mexico City. Furious at the breach of security, he issues a swift executive decree ordering the immediate execution of every single recaptured Texan prisoner.
- March 15 - Yielding to frantic appeals from foreign diplomats (including British Minister Richard Pakenham and U.S. Minister Waddy Thompson), Santa Anna modifies his execution order, reducing the sentence to decimation,the execution of every tenth man.
- March 25 - The Black Bean Episode. At El Salado, the 176 recaptured Texans are lined up. Mexican officers place 176 beans into an earthen jar: 159 white beans and 17 black beans. The prisoners are forced to draw blind. Drawing a black bean meant immediate death by firing squad. The 17 Texans who draw black beans, including major figures like young raw volunteers and senior officers, are blindfolded, seated on a bench, and shot to death by a firing squad in the early evening. Captain Ewen Cameron draws a white bean, but is held back for separate execution.
- March 28 - The remaining 159 white-bean survivors are forced onto the highway, marched past the unburied bodies of their comrades, and ordered south toward Perote Prison in Veracruz.
- April 3 - Post-Captain Edwin Ward Moore, commanding the Texas Navy flagship Austin and the brig Wharton, departs from New Orleans. He openly defies President Sam Houston’s repeat orders to return to Galveston for decommissioning, sailing instead to the Yucatan coast to honor Texas's defense treaty with the Yucatán federalists.
- April 4 - President Sam Houston issues a severe executive proclamation denouncing Post-Captain Edwin Ward Moore of the Second Texas Navy as a mutineer. Houston accuses Moore of open insubordination, suspends his commission, and requests that foreign vessels treat the Texas fleet as pirates if they fail to return to Galveston.
- April 15 - News of the Black Bean executions reaches Texas via New Orleans newspapers, plunging the Republic into massive public mourning and sparking renewed, but financially impossible, demands for an invasion of Mexico. Meanwhile, Edwin Ward Moore's small fleet arrives off the coast of Campeche, finding the city under a tight blockade by a powerful Mexican centralist fleet commanded by Commodore Tomás Marín.
- April 17 - Edwin Ward Moore assesses the enemy fleet and notes that Mexico possesses a massive technical advantage. The Mexican fleet features two brand-new, British-built, iron-hulled steam warships: the paddle frigate Guadalupe and the steam frigate Montezuma. These are among the most advanced, heavily armed iron steamships in the world at the time.
- April 19 - Edwin Ward Moore coordinates with Yucatan federalist leaders, who reinforce his command with several small, local gunboats to assist the Texas vessels against the Mexican steamers.
- April 25 - The Snively Expedition. Jacob Snively receives an official commission from the Texas War Department to raise a force of 300 mounted volunteers. The mission is to march north and intercept a rich Mexican merchant caravan traveling along the Santa Fe Trail through territory claimed by Texas.
- April 26 - In Mexico City, under direct orders from Santa Anna, Captain Ewen Cameron is executed by a firing squad at the prison of Perote, despite having drawn a white bean a month earlier.
- April 30 - Naval Battle of Campeche. The Texas Navy vessels Austin and Wharton, relying entirely on unpredictable coastal winds, sail directly toward the Mexican blockading squadron. The sailing ships engage the steam-powered Guadalupe and Montezuma in a sharp, two-hour artillery duel. Despite the steamers' ability to maneuver independent of the wind, the expert gunnery of the Texas crews inflicts heavy damage on the Guadalupe's upper decks, forcing the Mexican fleet to temporarily break off the action and retreat to deeper water.
- May 2 - Both fleets spend the day out of range, making hasty repairs. Edwin Ward Moore patches the rigging on the Austin while the Mexican commanders repair the shattered paddle-boxes on their steam frigates.
- May 6 - A light breeze allows the Austin and Wharton to close the distance again. A distant cannonade erupts, but the Mexican steamships utilize their speed to maintain a safe distance while trying to use their heavy explosive shell guns to detonate the wooden hulls of the Texas ships.
- May 10 - A severe, dead calm hits the Gulf. Trapped without wind, the Texas sailing ships are completely dead in the water. The Mexican iron steamers Guadalupe and Montezuma take immediate advantage, using their engines to circle the helpless Texas vessels and open a relentless, long-range bombardment.
- May 14 - Ignoring Sam Houston's piracy proclamation, Post-Captain Edwin Ward Moore engages Mexican ironclad warships off the coast of Yucatan, utilizing the flagship Austin and the brig Wharton to decisively damage the Mexican vessels and protect the Yucatán federalists.
- May 16 - Naval Battle of Campeche. A fresh land breeze kicks up, allowing Captain Edwin Ward Moore to execute a brilliant tactical maneuver. He crowds on all canvas and sails the Austin directly into the path of the advancing Mexican steam fleet. Operating at near point-blank range, the Austin and Wharton unleash devastating, coordinated broadsides of solid shot against the iron hulls of the Guadalupe and Montezuma. The precision of the Texas gunners shatters the wheelhouse of the Guadalupe and kills dozens of Mexican sailors. Badly battered, smoking, and suffering from catastrophic mechanical and hull damage, the advanced Mexican iron steamships turn away and abandon the fight. The Texas fleet suffers minor hull damage, retaining complete control of the waters.
- May 20 - Jacob Snively’s expeditionary force arrives at the Arkansas River, setting up a concealed base camp along the international boundary to await the arrival of the Santa Fe caravan.
- May 22 - Commodore Marín's defeated centralist fleet completely lifts the blockade and retreats to Veracruz, leaving the Texas Navy victorious. The battle marks the first and only time in naval history that sailing ships decisively defeated ironclad steamships in open combat.
- May 24 - Texas commissioners meet along the Trinity River with representatives from the Delaware, Chickasaw, Waco, and Anadarko tribes to establish a temporary ceasefire line. While Moore celebrates the historic naval victory at Campeche, President Sam Houston, unaware of the battle's outcome, signs an official executive proclamation declaring Edwin Moore a pirate and an outlaw for conducting unauthorized foreign warfare, setting up an intense political standoff upon the fleet's eventual return to Galveston.
- June 10 - Under intense diplomatic pressure from British Chargé d'Affaires Charles Elliot and French Minister Dubois de Saligny, Santa Anna officially issues a decree ordering a formal suspension of hostilities against Texas, opening the door for an armistice.
- June 15 - Reacting to the diplomatic opening, President Sam Houston issues an official executive proclamation declaring a formal armistice between Texas and Mexico, completely halting all official border raids while formal peace commissioners are appointed.
- June 20 - Unaware of the armistice, Snively's scouts locate a vanguard of 100 Mexican soldiers guarding the Santa Fe trade route. The Texans launch a surprise charge, killing 17 Mexican troops and capturing 82 prisoners along with their horses and supplies.
- June 30 - Captain Philip St. George Cooke, commanding a large detachment of United States Dragoons guarding the American side of the trail, encounters Snively's camp. Declaring the Texans to be operating on U.S. soil, Cooke surrounds the force, disarms them at gunpoint, and sends half the dejected volunteers back to the Texas settlements under escort.
- July 4 - Independence Day is marked by public dynamic debates at Washington-on-the-Brazos, with citizens fiercely divided over Houston's armistice and the legal status of the Navy.
- July 14 - Post-Captain Edwin Ward Moore finally sails the Second Texas Navy back into Galveston harbor. The fleet is greeted with raucous cheers by the local populace, who treat Moore as a naval hero despite Houston's outstanding arrest warrants.
- July 26 - The remnants of the fractured Snively Expedition arrive back in the settlements, empty-handed and bitter over their disarmament by the U.S. Army.
- August 5 - President Sam Houston appoints George W. Hockley and Samuel M. Williams as official commissioners to travel to Sabinas, to sit down with Mexican authorities and finalize the formal terms of the military armistice.
- August 14 - Extensive yellow fever cases are confirmed in Galveston, placing the primary seaport under a temporary medical quarantine that slows international shipping.
- August 29 - British diplomats inform the Texas Department of State that London is prepared to officially arbitrate a permanent peace treaty, provided Texas remains a sovereign republic independent of United States territory.
- September 4 - Voters across Texas elect members to the Eighth Congress, with the majority shifting toward politicians who favor a renewed push for annexation to the United States over British mediation.
- September 29 - Treaty of Bird's Fort. Texas commissioners officially sign a comprehensive peace treaty with nine major native tribes at Bird's Fort (near modern-day Arlington). The historic document legally establishes official trading posts along the line of settlements and mandates that both sides cease all retaliatory horse raiding and captive taking.
- October 1 - Diplomatic backchannels open between Texas Minister Isaac Van Zandt in Washington, D.C., and U.S. Secretary of State Abel P. Upshur. Upshur hints that the United States is now prepared to reopen formal annexation talks, driven by deep American fears that Great Britain is gaining too much economic influence over independent Texas.
- October 16 - Texas Armistice commissioners Hockley and Williams arrive in northern Mexico to begin preliminary technical conferences with General Adrián Woll regarding the boundary lines of the ceasefire.
- October 24 - A major Norther storm sweeps across central Texas, causing temperature drops that halt wagon transport along the route between Houston and Austin.
- November 6 - The Eighth Congress of the Republic of Texas formally assembles for its regular session at Washington-on-the-Brazos.
- November 12 - President Sam Houston delivers his annual message to Congress. He extols the successful signing of the Treaty of Bird's Fort, defends his use of British mediation to secure the armistice with Mexico, and urges absolute fiscal conservatism.
- November 25 - Congress initiates a formal debate over a bill to officially sell the remaining vessels of the Second Texas Navy at public auction to completely satisfy the national maritime debt, a move that meets fierce resistance from the public.
- December 5 - Secret executive sessions are held within the Texas Senate regarding the confidential annexation proposal received from the United States government.
- December 14 - President Sam Houston formally instructs Minister Van Zandt to demand absolute guarantees from the U.S. government that American troops and naval vessels will be stationed along the Texas border to protect the country from a Mexican invasion the moment an annexation treaty is signed.
- December 25 - Christmas Day is marked by a severe hard freeze across the Brazos valley, keeping the politicians confined to their log boarding houses.
- December 31 - The year 1843 closes with the Republic of Texas enjoying its first prolonged period of military peace in years under the active armistice, while the engines of diplomacy are secretly set to shift the nation toward formal incorporation into the American Union.

== 1844 ==
- January 1 - The Eighth Texas Congress, sitting at Washington-on-the-Brazos, reviews the status of the national currency, noting that "Exchequer Bills" have stabilized significantly due to strict spending limits.
- January 14 - In New Orleans, former Texas Navy Post-Captain Edwin Ward Moore publishes a lengthy public defense of his actions at the Battle of Campeche, severely criticizing Sam Houston’s administration.
- January 20 - President Sam Houston sends a confidential message to the Texas Congress, detailing the strict defense guarantees he has demanded from U.S. President John Tyler as a mandatory prerequisite for signing any annexation treaty.
- January 24 - Congress passes an act officially regulating the legal procedures for the return of runaway slaves from the frontier, aligning Texas statutory law closer to the legal systems of the southern United States.
- February 1 - President Houston signs an appropriation bill allocating minimal funds to maintain the frontier trading posts established by the Treaty of Bird's Fort.
- February 5 - Congress officially passes a resolution authorizing the executive to dispatch a special minister to Washington, D.C., to assist Isaac Van Zandt in finalizing a secret treaty of annexation.
- February 11 - The Eighth Texas Congress formally adjourns its regular session.
- February 15 - In Sabinas, Mexico, Texas commissioners George W. Hockley and Samuel M. Williams officially sign a formal, technical armistice agreement with Mexican General Adrián Woll. The document solidifies the suspension of border hostilities but implicitly refers to Texas as a department of Mexico, causing immediate political backlash when the text reaches Texas.
- February 20 - President Houston appoints Henderson Yoakum and J. Pinckney Henderson as special diplomatic envoys to the United States, instructing Henderson to carry secret executive instructions regarding the immediate movement of U.S. troops to the Texas border.
- March 2 - Public celebrations across the Republic observe the eighth anniversary of independence, with public sentiment heavily favoring the reopening of American annexation talks.
- March 11 - President Houston receives the official text of the Sabinas Armistice. Enraged by the phrasing that compromises Texas sovereignty, Houston immediately rejects the document and declares the armistice informal but functional on a purely military basis.
- March 20 - Special Envoy J. Pinckney Henderson arrives in Washington, D.C., and joins Isaac Van Zandt to open formal, daily drafting sessions with U.S. Secretary of State John C. Calhoun (who assumed office following the death of Abel P. Upshur).
- April 11 - Secretary of State Calhoun provides a confidential written assurance to the Texas diplomats that U.S. Army units will be concentrated near Fort Jesup on the Louisiana border, and a naval squadron deployed in the Gulf, to defend Texas the moment the treaty is signed.
- April 12 - In Washington, D.C., Texas ministers Isaac Van Zandt and J. Pinckney Henderson, alongside U.S. Secretary of State John C. Calhoun, officially sign the Tyler-Texan Treaty of Annexation. Under its terms, Texas would cede all its public lands to the United States, while the U.S. would assume up to $10 million of the Texas national debt and incorporate Texas as a territory.
- April 22 - U.S. President John Tyler formally submits the Treaty of Annexation to the United States Senate for ratification, accompanied by Calhoun's highly controversial diplomatic notes defending annexation as a necessary measure to protect the institution of slavery from British abolitionist influence.
- May 1 - News that the annexation treaty has been signed reaches Galveston, sparking massive public demonstrations, bonfires, and cannon salutes along the coast.
- May 14 - British Chargé d'Affaires Charles Elliot and French Minister Dubois de Saligny travel to Washington-on-the-Brazos to meet with President Sam Houston. They present a joint European protest against annexation, offering to secure Mexico's permanent recognition of Texas independence if Texas pledges to remain a sovereign republic.
- May 22 - General Adrián Woll dispatches a formal military communication to the Texas government, warning that Mexico considers the signing of the Washington annexation treaty an explicit violation of the armistice, and declares that hostilities will legally resume on June 11.
- June 8 - Following weeks of fierce, acrimonious debate over sectional slavery expansion and fears of an immediate war with Mexico, the United States Senate soundly rejects the Treaty of Annexation by a crushing vote of 35 to 16. Battle of Walker's Creek. Texas Rangers led by the Captain Jack Hays fought a band of Comanche warriors led by Yellow Wolf in an engagement known as the Battle of Walker's Creek. The fight is notable for the rangers’ use of the new Colt Paterson 5-shot revolver.
- June 15 - Official word of the U.S. Senate's rejection reaches President Sam Houston. Houston immediately pivots his foreign policy, reopening deep diplomatic channels with British agent Charles Elliot to leverage British mediation with Mexico.
- June 20 - General Adrián Woll officially publishes his counter-invasion decree along the Rio Grande, declaring that any Texan found within a radius of one league of the river will be shot as a bandit, effectively ending the period of formal armistice.
- July 4 - Independence Day celebrations are marked by intense political rallies across the Republic, as the race to succeed Sam Houston as president begins to solidify.
- July 15 - Dr. Anson Jones, the current Secretary of State and Sam Houston's hand-picked candidate, outlines his presidential platform, advocating for a cautious, balanced foreign policy that keeps both annexation and permanent independent recognition as viable options.
- July 26 - Nationalist leader General Edward Burleson, running as the opposition candidate for president, launches a fierce public campaign, attacking Houston’s defensive policies and demanding a stronger military posture against Mexican border threats.
- August 5 - Reports reach the War and Marine Department that small bands of Mexican cattle-guards and Texas border-traders have clashed near San Patricio, maintaining a state of low-level guerrilla friction along the Nueces Strip.
- August 14 - Severe late-summer heatwaves completely dry up the coastal wagon routes, slowing down the transit of political campaign couriers traveling between Houston and the eastern counties.
- August 29 - The remnants of the Mier Expedition prisoners receive a sudden executive pardon from Santa Anna in celebration of a Mexican national holiday; they are released from Perote Prison and begin organizing their transit back to Texas.
- September 2 - The citizens of Texas turn out in high numbers to decide the future direction of the country. Anson Jones wins a narrow, hard-fought victory over Edward Burleson to become the fourth constitutional President of the Republic of Texas. Kenneth L. Anderson is elected vice president.
- September 15 - Former Mier prisoner Thomas Green arrives in Galveston via a U.S. merchant steamer, receiving a massive public reception from local citizens.
- September 16 - All Texan prisoners are released by Mexico on orders from Santa Anna.
- September 25 - President Sam Houston and Texas commissioners open a major peace conference near modern-day Waco, sitting down with chiefs from the Comanche, Waco, and Keechi bands to reinforce the frontier trade treaties before Houston leaves office.
- October 9 - Treaty of Tehuacana Creek. President Sam Houston officially signs the final peace treaty of his administration with the Comanche Nation, establishing a system of licensed government traders and formalizing a line of demarcation to prevent white settlement encroachment.
- October 15 - In the United States, the presidential election centers heavily on the "Texas Question," with Democratic candidate James K. Polk running on an aggressive expansionist platform demanding the "Re-annexation of Texas" at the earliest opportunity.
- October 24 - British Minister Charles Elliot coordinates a secret plan with the Texas cabinet to send an envoy to Mexico City to present a formal treaty of peace based on permanent Texas independence.
- November 12 - The Ninth Congress of the Republic of Texas formally assembles for its regular session at Washington-on-the-Brazos.
- November 15 - Expansionist Democrat James K. Polk officially wins the United States presidential election, a result that completely transforms the geopolitical landscape and guarantees that annexation will be revived by the U.S. government.
- November 21 - President Sam Houston delivers his final annual message to Congress, fiercely defending his record of financial rehabilitation, peaceful Indian relations, and asserting that Texas now holds a dominant diplomatic position between the United States and western Europe.
- December 9 - Anson Jones is formally sworn in as the fourth and final constitutional President of the Republic of Texas at Washington-on-the-Brazos. In a measured inaugural address, Jones promises to manage the treasury with extreme economy while steering the nation safely toward either honorable annexation or secured independence.
- December 14 - President Anson Jones appoints Ebenezer Allen as his Secretary of State, charging him with maintaining active, parallel negotiations with both the United States legation and European ministers.
- December 21 - The Texas Congress passes a bill officially incorporating several new western judicial districts, aiming to expand statutory courts into the regions secured by Houston's Indian treaties.
- December 31 - The year 1844 closes with the Republic of Texas financially solvent and geopolitically secure, poised to exploit the upcoming political shift in Washington, D.C., as the American government prepares to make a definitive legislative offer to absorb the Lone Star state.

== 1845 ==
- January 1 - The Ninth Texas Congress, meeting at Washington-on-the-Brazos, passes an act to officially establish a system of common schools in the Republic, continuing the educational land endowments initiated years prior.
- January 10 - Secret letters arrive from Texas Minister Isaac Van Zandt in Washington, D.C., informing President Anson Jones that the U.S. Congress is rapidly moving toward a joint resolution to annex Texas, bypassing the need for a two-thirds Senate treaty majority.
- January 23 - The Texas Congress passes a joint resolution officially demanding that the United States assume the full scale of the Texas national debt if annexation is finalized.
- January 30 - President Anson Jones signs an act creating a specialized system of frontier defense pilots and scouts to maintain the peace lines established with the Comanche Nation.
- February 1 - The Ninth Texas Congress passes a bill officially incorporating the City of Galveston's deep-water port infrastructure to streamline maritime trade duties.
- February 3 - British Chargé d'Affaires Charles Elliot arrives at Washington-on-the-Brazos to deliver a stern warning to President Anson Jones, stating that the British cabinet will completely withdraw its commercial support if Texas surrenders its independence to the United States.
- February 5 - Congress passes a sweeping resolution officially legalizing the use of foreign gold and silver coin at standard U.S. valuation for all customs payments to stabilize the local treasury.
- February 11 - The Ninth Regular Session of the Texas Congress formally adjourns. Members return to their home districts to await the final legislative outcome of the American congressional session.
- March 1 - Outgoing U.S. President John Tyler signs the congressional Joint Resolution offering formal terms of annexation to the Republic of Texas. Under these revised terms, Texas would enter the Union directly as a state, retain its vast public lands, and retain its public debt, with its boundaries subject to future adjustment by the U.S. government.
- March 3 - U.S. President John Tyler dispatches Andrew Jackson Donelson as a special chargé d'affaires to Texas to officially deliver the annexation document to the Jones administration.
- March 20 - Special Minister J. Pinckney Henderson arrives in Austin to consult with local safety committees, reporting that public sentiment across the eastern and coastal counties is near-unanimous in demanding immediate acceptance of the American offer.
- March 29 - British Minister Charles Elliot and French Minister Alphonse Dubois de Saligny arrive at Washington-on-the-Brazos. They present a secret diplomatic memorandum to President Anson Jones: if Texas pledges to reject the U.S. offer and maintain its sovereign independence, the British and French governments guarantee they will force Mexico to sign a permanent peace treaty recognizing the Rio Grande as the boundary.
- April 1 - Special U.S. Envoy Andrew Jackson Donelson arrives at Washington-on-the-Brazos and formally presents the official U.S. Annexation Resolution to President Anson Jones.
- April 5 - In total secrecy, President Anson Jones dispatches Secretary of State Ashbel Smith to Mexico City under a British naval escort. Smith carries the tentative European treaty terms, instructed to see if Mexico will genuinely sign a treaty recognizing Texas independence.
- April 15 - To maintain his diplomatic leverage and evaluate both options, President Anson Jones issues an executive proclamation calling for a special session of the Texas Congress to assemble in June to formally debate the United States proposal.
- April 26 - Public outrage erupts against President Jones as rumors spread that he is secretly conspiring with British agents to block annexation. Effigies of Jones are publicly burned in San Augustine, Galveston, and Houston.
- May 1 - U.S. Agent Andrew Jackson Donelson writes frantic dispatches to Washington, D.C., urging U.S. Secretary of War William L. Marcy to position regular U.S. Army units along the Sabine River to counter potential British interference.
- May 19 - In Mexico City, Mexican Foreign Minister Luis G. Cuevas officially signs the preliminary treaty brokered by Ashbel Smith. The document explicitly recognizes the absolute independence of the Republic of Texas on the strict, single condition that Texas pledges never to annex itself to the United States.
- May 28 - Ashbel Smith arrives back in Texas with the signed Mexican document, presenting President Anson Jones with a definitive choice between formal independent recognition and U.S. statehood.
- June 4 - President Jones issues an official executive proclamation presenting both options to the public. He simultaneously lifts the old military embargoes and declares an official cessation of hostilities against Mexico, based on the newly arrived Mexican peace treaty.
- June 16 - The special session of the Ninth Texas Congress formally opens at Washington-on-the-Brazos. President Jones officially lays both documents before the Senate: the U.S. Joint Resolution of Annexation and the Mexican Treaty of Independence.
- June 21 - The Texas Senate votes unanimously (14-0) to flatly reject the Mexican peace treaty. Concurrently, both houses of Congress pass a joint resolution overwhelmingly accepting the United States' offer of annexation.
- July 4 - The historic Convention of 1845 formally assembles in Austin, selecting Thomas Jefferson Rusk as president of the convention. On its opening day, the convention votes 55-to-1 to officially adopt the Ordinance of Annexation, formally accepting the U.S. terms. The lone dissenting vote is cast by civil rights leader Richard Bache Jr.
- July 7 - The convention receives an official communication from U.S. Agent Andrew Jackson Donelson confirming that U.S. General Zachary Taylor has been ordered to immediately advance U.S. troops into Texas territory to secure the border against any sudden Mexican retaliation.
- July 26 - General Zachary Taylor’s vanguard, commanding the U.S. Army of Observation, arrives by sea at Corpus Christi near the mouth of the Nueces River, establishing a massive military encampment on soil claimed by both Texas and Mexico.
- August 5 - At the Austin convention, delegates begin drafting the specific articles of the new Texas State Constitution of 1845, utilizing the constitutions of Louisiana and Tennessee as structural models.
- August 16 - The convention explicitly rejects a proposal to divide Texas into multiple distinct states, deciding that the massive territory must remain unified under a single state governance system.
- August 28 - General Zachary Taylor reports to the U.S. War Department that his forces are firmly entrenched at Corpus Christi, noting that while Mexican cavalry patrols are visible across the Nueces, no open shots have been fired.
- September 4 - The Constitutional Convention in Austin formally completes its work, finalizing and signing the newly drafted Texas State Constitution.
- September 15 - Print shops in Houston and Galveston begin churning out thousands of broadside copies of the new constitution, distributing them to local counties for public review.
- September 25 - A sharp outbreak of dengue fever strikes the U.S. military camps at Corpus Christi, temporarily sidelining dozens of regular soldiers but failing to halt defensive fortifications.
- October 13 - The citizens of the Republic of Texas turn out at local polling stations to cast their final national ballots. The electorate votes overwhelmingly to ratify the Annexation Ordinance (4,254 to 267) and approves the new state constitution by a similar landslide.
- October 24 - Formal certified election returns are packed into leather saddlebags and dispatched via courier to Washington, D.C., for delivery to the U.S. Congress.
- November 10 - In Washington, D.C., U.S. President James K. Polk reviews the ratified Texas documents and prepares his annual address to Congress, declaring the annexation process a historic triumph for American continental expansion.
- November 20 - President Anson Jones issues an executive order organizing the final logistical transitions of the regular land offices, ensuring that all land bounty records are preserved for the incoming state administration.
- December 15 - In the United States House of Representatives, a joint resolution to formally admit Texas as a state of the Union is passed by a wide margin of 141 to 56.
- December 22 - The United States Senate passes the identical admission resolution by a vote of 31 to 14, overcoming the final filibuster attempts by northern anti-slavery Whigs.
- December 29 - U.S. President James K. Polk officially signs the Joint Resolution for the Admission of the State of Texas into the Union. From a strict constitutional and international legal standpoint, Texas officially becomes the 28th state of the United States on this day.
- December 31 - The year 1845 concludes with the Republic of Texas legally dissolved on paper, though President Anson Jones and the local civil structures remain in place temporarily to handle the physical handoff of local power scheduled for early 1846.

== 1846 ==
- January 1 - Operating out of the raw frontier capital of Austin, President Anson Jones and his remaining executive staff spend the New Year holiday organizing the physical transition of national land grant titles and diplomatic files into state-compliant record structures.
- January 7 - President Jones issues an official executive proclamation calling for the newly elected senators and representatives of the incoming Texas State Legislature to assemble in Austin on the third Monday of February to organize the first state government.
- January 12 - The Supreme Court of the Republic of Texas concludes its final informal administrative sessions, turning over its legal dockets and case archives to the newly designated state judicial clerks.
- January 20 - Major commercial shipping lines in Galveston and Houston report a massive influx of American merchants and families arriving from the United States, seeking to secure land before the formal opening of the state courts.
- January 26 - General Zachary Taylor, commanding the U.S. Army of Observation at Corpus Christi, receives final operational orders from U.S. Secretary of War William L. Marcy instructing him to prepare his column to advance his positions directly to the north bank of the Rio Grande.
- February 2 - President Anson Jones officially signs the final executive warrants out of the Republic's treasury, completely liquidating the remaining operational balances of the national civil departments to ensure all outstanding public servants are paid in full.
- February 10 - In Austin, workers begin clearing and staging the public grounds in front of the rustic, pine-log capitol building, constructing a large wooden platform to accommodate the crowds arriving for the scheduled transfer of power ceremony.
- February 15 - J. Pinckney Henderson, who had been overwhelmingly elected as the first Governor of the state of Texas in the December 1845 elections, arrives in Austin along with Lieutenant Governor-elect Albert Clinton Horton to prepare for their formal inaugurations.
- February 16 - The First Legislature of the State of Texas formally convenes in Austin. The Texas House of Representatives and the State Senate officially organize their respective chambers, count the formal election returns, and certify the legal transition of the state executive branch.
- February 18 - The State Legislature passes its first joint resolution, officially coordinating with President Anson Jones to schedule the formal, public valedictory ceremonies of the Republic for the following morning.
- February 19 - At 11:00 AM, a massive crowd of citizens, Texas Rangers, volunteer militia, and newly elected officials gathers under a clear winter sky in front of the log capitol building in Austin. President Anson Jones steps forward onto the wooden platform to deliver his final, emotional valedictory address. He defends his cautious diplomatic strategy, breaks his silence on his maneuvers with Great Britain and Mexico, and declares that his balancing act successfully forced the United States to offer statehood on highly honorable terms. He concludes with his famous historic declaration: "The final act of the great drama is now performed. The Republic of Texas is no more." As Jones finishes speaking, the official Lone Star flag of the Republic of Texas is slowly lowered from the staff. President Jones personally gathers the flag, folds it, and hands it over to Governor-elect J. Pinckney Henderson. The Stars and Stripes of the United States is triumphantly raised to the top of the mast, accompanied by a booming 28-cannon salute from a local artillery detachment to signify Texas's entry as the 28th state. Governor J. Pinkney Henderson is immediately sworn into office as the first Governor of Texas, and the independent national era of the Republic of Texas officially comes to a close.

== See also ==
- Bibliography of the Texas Revolution, Republic, and Annexation
