= Battle of the San Gabriels =

1839 battle of the Texas-Indian Wars

- Part of The Texas–Indian wars
Date	17 May 1839
Location	The San Gabriel River, near Georgetown, Texas 29°44′56.3712″N 97°52′10.05″W
Result	Texian victory

Belligerents
Republic of Texas	Mexico; Various Indians

Commanders and leaders
(Republic of Texas) Lt. James Rice	(Mexico) Manuel Flores
- Location within Texas

The Battle of the San Gabriels was an 1839 skirmish in the Texas–Indian wars.

The battle began on 17 May 1839. A company of Texas Rangers under Lt. James O. Rice had pursued the Mexican agent Manuel Flores and his party of Mexicans and Indians, following their murder of four surveyors working between Seguin and San Antonio, Texas. Battle was commenced on the north San Gabriel River, after the 2 day pursuit. In the first charge, Flores was killed and his company fled, abandoning a supply train intended to equip the Indians of East Texas for a revolt against the Texians. In the captured baggage, Rice discovered letters between Flores and Vicente Córdova as well as instructions from Mexican general Valentín Canalizo, detailing the Córdova Rebellion. These letters contradicted The Bowl's previous denials of involvement with Córdova's revolt and led to the Cherokee War.

A marker was placed near the site in 1936.

== See also ==
- Timeline of the Republic of Texas
- Córdova Rebellion
- Battle of the Neches
- Mathew Caldwell

== Bibliography ==
- Mann, William L. Mann: Battle of the San Gabriels from the Handbook of Texas Online. Retrieved 20 Feb 2010.
- Patten, Roderick B.: Manuel Flores from the Handbook of Texas Online. Retrieved 20 Feb 2010.
- "Foreign Influences," including Córdova's letter. Texas Library & Archives Commission. Retrieved 20 Feb 2010.
