= Larissa, Texas =

Unincorporated community in Cherokee County, Texas, United States

- Unincorporated community
- Location in Texas Location in the United States
- Coordinates: 32°3′21″N 95°19′31″W
- Country: United States
- State: Texas
- County: Cherokee

Larissa is an unincorporated community in Cherokee County, Texas, United States. Larissa lies west of U.S. Highway 69, off Farm to Market Road 855 and approximately halfway between Jacksonville and Bullard. Larissa is about 20 miles (32 km) northwest of the county seat of Rusk.

== History ==
=== Settlement ===
Larissa was originally settled by the Killough, Wood, and Williams families. Larissa was the scene of the Killough Massacre, possibly the worst single Indian incident in the history of east Texas. The settlers had moved there from Talladega County, Alabama, in 1837.

Unaware, apparently, that the land made available to them was hotly disputed by the Cherokee Indians who lived in the area, Isaac Killough and his homesteaders began building homes and clearing land for crops. Only a year before, however, the area surrounding their settlement had been set aside to the Cherokee under a treaty negotiated and signed by Sam Houston and John Forbes. When the Senate of the Republic of Texas refused to ratify the treaty and then in fact nullified it, the Cherokee, who already thought they had conceded enough, became extremely agitated.

The immediate and increasing influx of Anglo settlers into lands thought to have been theirs did nothing to calm resentments among the Indians and there being also residual bitterness among some Tejanos still loyal to Mexico, the atmosphere in the region became tense in early 1838. Complicating matters was that some militant Cherokee were also loyal to Mexico. By the summer of that year, there were rumblings of coming insurrection from either or both of those factions, and evidence did exist for collusion between them.

Fearing this growing unrest, Killough, his relatives and friends, fled to Nacogdoches for refuge. On condition they would leave the area after doing so, the Cherokee leaders agreed to their safe passage if they would return simply to harvest their crops. They did so. But on October 5, 1838, a band of Cherokee who had not been party to the agreement attacked the settlement. Most of the Killough group—a total of eighteen—were killed or abducted as they worked their fields. Those who survived fled for a time to Lacy's Fort on the San Antonio Road, just west of present-day Alto, Texas.

Following the massacre, it was not until 1846 and the removal of the Cherokee by Mirabeau B. Lamar that any significant resettlement took place. In that year, Thomas H. McKee, a Presbyterian minister who had immigrated from Lebanon, Tennessee, led an immigrant group to the area. Hoping to avoid the decadent lifestyle of nearby Talladega, known for its saloon and gambling dens, the McKee party moved north of that location to settle near the older Killough compound. Their settlement was at first called McKee Colony.

=== Development ===
When T.N. McKee, Thomas' son, laid out a townsite, the new town was given the name, Larissa, after the Grecian city of that name thought to have been a center of learning. The Larissa post office also opened in 1847, followed by a Masonic lodge the following year.

In 1848, McKee built a one-room schoolhouse, originally named Larissa Academy. In 1855, he secured financial support from the Brazos Synod of the Cumberland Presbyterian Church and they assumed responsibility for the school, which was renamed Larissa College. Chartered by the State of Texas in 1856, it eventually boasted a three-story college building, two dormitories and a curriculum that included Latin, French, Spanish, chemistry, physics, rhetoric, logic and mathematics. It also boasted an observatory with a telescope said to have been more powerful than that at Yale University. Larissa College was a co-educational school, but the men and women were taught separately, with a hill between the male and female "departments."

When the nearby community of Talladega faded away in the 1850s, much of the commerce done there moved to Larissa, which by then was a vibrant small town with several stores, a salt works, a church, and, of course, Larissa College.

Larissa was in its hey-day.

=== Decline ===
The Civil War sapped much of the vitality of the community and decimated enrollment at Larissa College, forcing it to close for the duration. Reconstruction took its toll as well. The college resumed operations after the war, but lacking students and faculty, it never recovered. By 1866 the Presbyterian Synod had withdrawn financial support, consolidating its efforts at Trinity University, which opened at Tehuacana in 1869.

By 1870 Larissa College was forced to close. Its assets, including the telescope, were transferred to Trinity University.

The college having developed as its reason for existence, the town of Larissa itself entered a period of steady decline and disappointment. In 1872, the Great Northern Railway line laid its tracks eight miles south of Larissa. That same year, a meningitis epidemic took a number of the remaining residents, and finally, in 1882, tracks for the Kansas and Gulf Short Line Railroad, which might otherwise have saved the town, was laid three miles east of Larissa. Those who had remained, including prominent founders of Larissa, moved on to the newly established community of Mount Selman, on the railroad.

As of 1990, little remained at the town-site to suggest Larissa had ever been there, much less of the promise it seemed to offer. There is an historical marker at the site of the college, placed there in 1936 on the occasion of the Texas Centennial. Another monument stands at the site of the Killough Massacre, and there are three cemeteries where are interred many founders of the town, including members of the Killough and McKee families.

Otherwise, the homes and outbuildings of a typical farming community dot the landscape, all having little connection with what was once there.

== Additional reading ==
- Baker, Lindsey T. (1986). Ghost Towns of Texas. Norman, OK: University of Oklahoma Press.
- King, Dick (1953). Ghost Towns of Texas. San Antonio, TX: The Naylor Company.
- Roach, Hattie Joplin (1976). The Hills of Cherokee: Historical Sketches of Life in Cherokee County, Texas. Fort Worth, TX: News Printing Co. Inc.
