= Kelsey Harris Douglass =

Soldier and politician from the Republic of Texas

Kelsey Harris Douglass (1790 – 4 October 1840) was a Texian soldier, politician, and merchant who led Texian forces at the Battle of the Neches. He was born in Knox County, Tennessee in 1790, and died in 1840. A member of the Congress of the Republic of Texas, he campaigned for veterans of the Texas–Indian wars and introduced the 1838 legislation that would later create the University of Texas. A descendant would describe him as "Texas' unknown soldier".

He fought against the Cherokee, leading the fight at the Battle of the Neches and burning a number of villages and forcing them out of East Texas.

Douglass was a charter member of the Grand Lodge of Texas.

The town of Douglass is named after him, after he set up businesses in the area.
