= Texas dollar =

Currency of the Republic of Texas

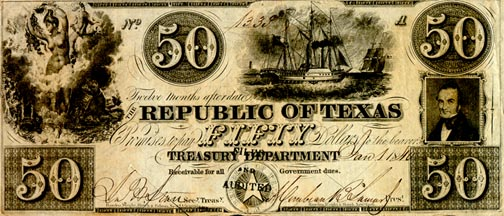
- Fifty-dollar bearer note

Denominations
- Banknotes: $1, $2, $3, $5, $10, $20, $50, $100, $500

Demographics
- User(s): Republic of Texas
- This infobox shows the latest status before this currency was rendered obsolete.

The Texas dollar was the currency of the Republic of Texas. Several forms of currency were issued, but an ongoing economic depression made it difficult for the government to provide effective backing. The republic accepted the standard gold and silver coins of the United States, but never minted its own coins.

== Negotiable promissory notes ==
During the Panic of 1837, the Texas Congress authorized the issue of interest-bearing promissory notes to pay expenses and sustain commerce. These notes were known as "star money" after the prominent five-pointed star printed on the front. They had to be passed by endorsement and therefore were held mainly as investments rather than public currency. Additional promissory notes issued in 1838 did not bear interest and depreciated rapidly.

== Redbacks ==
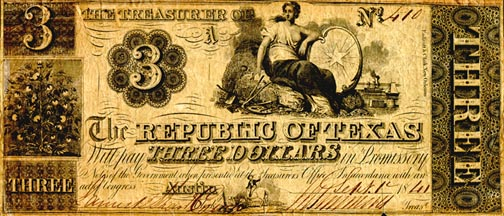
Three-dollar change note

"Redbacks" were bearer promissory notes issued between January 1839 and September 1840 by second President Mirabeau B. Lamar to fund the national debt during his presidency of the Texan republic. Inflation, due mainly to overprinting, devalued the notes substantially. Initially, $1 in redbacks was valued at 37 1/2 cents in specie. This debt of over $10 million was an important factor for annexation into the United States.

The redbacks were issued in the denominations of $5, $10, $20, $50, $100, and $500 bills. There were also “change notes” issued at the time of $1, $2, and $3 bills that had a blank back. All of these notes were issued from Austin. Many of the notes appear as orange-colored because of the quality of the ink. Several people have suggested that the “burnt orange” color of The University of Texas at Austin came from this coloring, but it cannot be proven.

The government cut-cancelled redbacks and change upon redemption to keep them from being fraudulently redeemed again. The cancelled notes are highly sought after by collectors. A few notes were never redeemed or cut-cancelled; those notes are valued more highly. Two early Republic of Texas heroes are found on redbacks. Both had died prior to the issuance of the notes. Deaf Smith is found on the $5 redback, while the "Father of Texas," Stephen F. Austin, is found on the $50 note.

Congress acknowledged the redbacks' collapse in 1842 by refusing to accept them at face value for payment of taxes. Texans increasingly relied on United States currency, shinplasters and private obligations.

== Exchequer bills ==
The end of the redback coincided with the presidency of John Tyler in the United States, who had proposed a regulated paper money system called the Exchequer plan. Upon resuming the presidency of Texas, Sam Houston attempted to restore the negotiable note system under the name of the "exchequer bills." This effort had little success until the following year, when economic conditions throughout North America began to improve. By 1845 the bills were passing at par value.

Under the Compromise of 1850, Texas was given $10 million for all the land it had claimed outside its present day state boundary. With this money, Texas paid off all its debts, including the redemption of its banknotes.

== See also ==
- "Greenback"(Nickname newly given for the United States Dollar)
- "Greyback" (Nickname given for the Confederate States Dollar)
- Currency
