= Battle of the Neches =

1839 battle of the Cherokee War

- Part of the Texas-Indian Wars
Date	July 15 & 16, 1839
Location	West of modern Tyler, Texas
Result	Texan victory

Belligerents
Republic of Texas; Tonkawa Indians	Cherokee; Delaware

Commanders and leaders
Gen. Kelsey Douglass; Gen. Thomas Rusk; Col. Edward Burleson; Chief Plácido	The Bowl †; Big Mush †

Strength
Approx. 500	600–700

Casualties and losses
8 killed 29 wounded, incl. Vice President Burnet	More than 100 killed

The Battle of the Neches, the main engagement of the Cherokee War of 1838–1839 (part of the Texas–Indian Wars), took place on 15–16 July in 1839 in what is now the Redland community (between Tyler and Ben Wheeler, Texas). It resulted from the Córdova Rebellion and Texas President Mirabeau Bonaparte Lamar's determination to remove the Cherokee people from Texas. Many Cherokee had migrated there from the American Southeast to avoid being forced to Indian Territory.

== Background ==
During Sam Houston's first term as president of Texas, while maintaining the Texas Rangers to police rogue Indians, Houston used diplomacy and presents to keep the peace on the frontier with the Comanche and Kiowa, and treated with his allies, the Cherokee. Houston had lived with the Cherokee and had earned his reputation among Native Americans for fairness and decency. The Cherokee were unhappy that the promises to give them title to their lands, which he had made them to secure their neutrality during the Texas Revolution, had not been fulfilled. Houston negotiated a settlement with them in February 1836, though he was unable to get the Legislature to ratify the portion of the treaty confirming the Cherokee's land titles. This was neither the first nor last time the legislature refused to ratify agreements Houston made with the Indians.

In 1838, letters on the person of counterrevolutionary, Manuel Flores addressing Cherokee Chiefs Big Mush and Chief Bowles was found of their collusion against the Texans. Coupled with the recent massacres of the Killough and Wood families, a commission was established to pay for their improvements they had constructed and for them to relocate to their assigned lands north of the Red River. The letter written in Spanish sought an arrangement with the Cherokee which would give them title to their land in exchange for assistance in joining a war of extermination against the Texians. Residents of Nacogdoches looking for a stolen horse found a camp of around one hundred armed Tejanos. Rather than allow the local militia to act, Houston (who was in Nacogdoches at the time) prohibited both sides from assembly or carrying of weapons. Local alcalde Vicente Córdova and eighteen other leaders of the revolt issued a proclamation with a number of demands to be met before their surrender. After being joined by around three hundred Indian warriors, they moved towards the Cherokee settlements.

Despite Houston's orders he should not cross the Angelina River to interfere, General Thomas Rusk sent on a party of 150 men under Major Henry Augustine, who defeated the rebels near Seguin, Texas. Despite the involvement of the Cherokee and the discovery of documents directly implicating Cherokee chief The Bowl on two separate Mexican agents over the next six months, Houston professed to believe the chief's denials and refused to order them arrested. In his several letters of reassurance to The Bowl during the unrest, Houston again promised them title to their land on the Neches River. Warriors believing their lands to be violated by the legal settlers then perpetrated the Killough massacre, killing eighteen.

In the wake of this and the publication of Rachel Plummer's narrative of her captivity among the Comanche, Texas's second president, Mirabeau B. Lamar, was less sympathetic toward the tribe and convinced that the Cherokees could not be allowed to stay in Texas. Stating that "the white man and the red man cannot dwell in harmony together," as "Nature forbids it," Lamar instructed his subordinates to communicate to the Cherokees:

that unless they consent at once to receive a fair Compensation for their improvements and other property, and remove out of this Country, nothing short of the entire distruction [sic] of all they possess, and the extermination of their Tribe will appease the indignation of the white people against them.

Should the Cherokee refuse compensation for their removal and resist, Lamar's orders were:

to push a rigorous war against them; pursuing them to their hiding places without mitigation or compassion, until they shall be made to feel that flight from our borders without hope of return, is preferable to the scourges of war.

The removal of the Cherokee was one of the first acts of his presidency.

== Battle ==
Lamar demanded that the Cherokee, who had never possessed legal title to their lands, accept a payment in cash and goods for the land and its improvements and move beyond the Red River into the U.S. Indian Territory. Houston protested but in vain. General Kelsey Douglass was charged with ensuring the removal and camped with about 500 Texan soldiers six miles south of the principal Cherokee settlement. On July 12, 1839, he sent a peace commission to negotiate for the Indians' removal. The Cherokee initially agreed to sign a treaty of removal guaranteeing them the profit from their crops and the cost of the removal, but they delayed for two days over a clause requiring them to be escorted from Texas under armed guard. On the third day, the commissioners told the Indians that the Texians were marching on their village immediately and those willing to leave peacefully should fly a white flag.

On 15 July 1839, the Texan Army advanced up Battle Creek, crossing the Neches to cut off possible reinforcement and intercept any Indians fleeing northward from the battle. The Cherokees were waiting on high ground and attacked The Indians were driven back and retreated into a nearby ravine. The army failed to block them, having been misled by their guide. The battle then continued sporadically through the day, at the end of which three Texans had been killed and five wounded against eighteen Cherokee.

The Cherokee retreated several miles overnight before Colonel James Carter's spy company discovered them near the Neches headwaters in modern Van Zandt County. The Cherokee attacked after the company had been joined by Col. Edward Burleson's company, and Rusk's company soon joined them on the left. The Texians charged the Indian position across open terrain, then pursued their retreat into the Neches bottom. The Texian losses were two killed and 27 wounded (3 fatally) to an estimated 100 dead Cherokee and Delaware.

== Aftermath ==
Among the Texians injured were serving Vice President David G. Burnet and Secretary of War Albert Sidney Johnston, both cited in the commander's report "for active exertions on the field" and "having behaved in such a manner as reflects great credit upon themselves." General Hugh McLeod and Major David Kaufman were also wounded, and John Reagan was a participant. The Bowl's horse was shot, and he dismounted to surrender. He was then fatally shot in the head by Captain Robert W. Smith, who took the sword gifted to The Bowl by Sam Houston. McLeod later presented The Bowl's hat as a gift to Houston.

After the battle, the Cherokee made one last attempt to reach Mexico by skirting the north of the Texian settlements, before being removed to Indian Territory.

== See also ==
- Timeline of the Republic of Texas
- Cherokee history
- Delaware history
