= Snively Expedition =

The Snively Expedition was a military operation launched in 1843 by the Texan Jacob Snively to attack the merchants of New Mexico. It happened along with an invasion carried out by Mc Daniel and Warfield which ended in a failure.

== Background ==
In an attempt to affirm the Texan ownership of New Mexico and capture the trade that flowed to New Mexico along the Camino de Santa Fe, Texas Governor Mirabeau Lamar launched an unfortunate expedition in 1841. Three hundred and twenty Texans, including 50 merchants, left on the expedition. The expedition failed and 172 men, "weak, hungry and afflicted with scurvy," surrendered to the governor of New Mexico Manuel Armijo. The Texans were forced to march 2,000 miles south to Veracruz prison, although they were released to return to Texas in 1842.

== The expedition ==
January 28, 1843, he asked the government of the republic for permission to organize and equip an expedition with the purpose of intercepting and capturing the property of Mexican merchants who could pass through the territory claimed by Texas on the Camino de Santa Fe. Snively's request was granted on February 16, and he was given permission to intercept and capture the property of Mexican merchants. His purpose was to retaliate and claim the injuries suffered by citizens of Texas; the merchandise and other properties of all Mexican citizens were going to be a legal prize." However, Snively was warned not to infringe the territory of the United States.

Without wasting time, Snively put himself at stake in the recruitment in "the most densely established parts of the republic." About 175 men gathered in mid-April, all with horses, weapons and provisions. Spending a week more or less organizing, dividing into three companies and performing at least one day of mounted simulation, the Texans, calling themselves "The Invincible Battalion," organized themselves into three companies and Snively was unanimously elected as commander. The force marched west along the old Chihuahua trail, crossed the Red River two miles below the mouth of the main river, Wichita, followed a north-northwest course through present-day Oklahoma and on May 27 it reached the Arkansas River and the Santa Fe trail in the vicinity of present-day Edwards County, Kansas.

Warfield and several of his group joined Snively in Kansas. On June 20, Snively's group attacked a Mexican military unit, killing 17 and taking 82 prisoners without losing their own. However, soon Snively's command broke as a result of the dissension. The Mexican prisoners were released and a group of 76 called "the boys of the house" left Snively and marched east towards Arkansas. On June 30, Snively and his remaining force were discovered by Captain Philip St. George Cooke and a U.S. army force of 185 men. Cooke informed Snively that he was in American territory, forced him to surrender and escorted about 50 disenchanted men from Snively's command to Missouri. Cook confiscated most of Snively's weapons. With about 70 men remaining, Snively and Warfield contemplated the possibility of attacking a Mexican commercial caravan, but decided that they did not have the capacity to do so and returned to Texas, dissolving on August 6.

== Aftermath ==
The failure of the incursions of 1843 put an end to the attempts of Texas, as an independent country, to capture territory in New México, in 1845 Texas joined the United States as a state, an event that precipitated the Mexican-American War. New Mexico was captured by US forces and became part of the United States.
