= ARM Guadaloupe =

Mexican naval vessel (1842–1846)

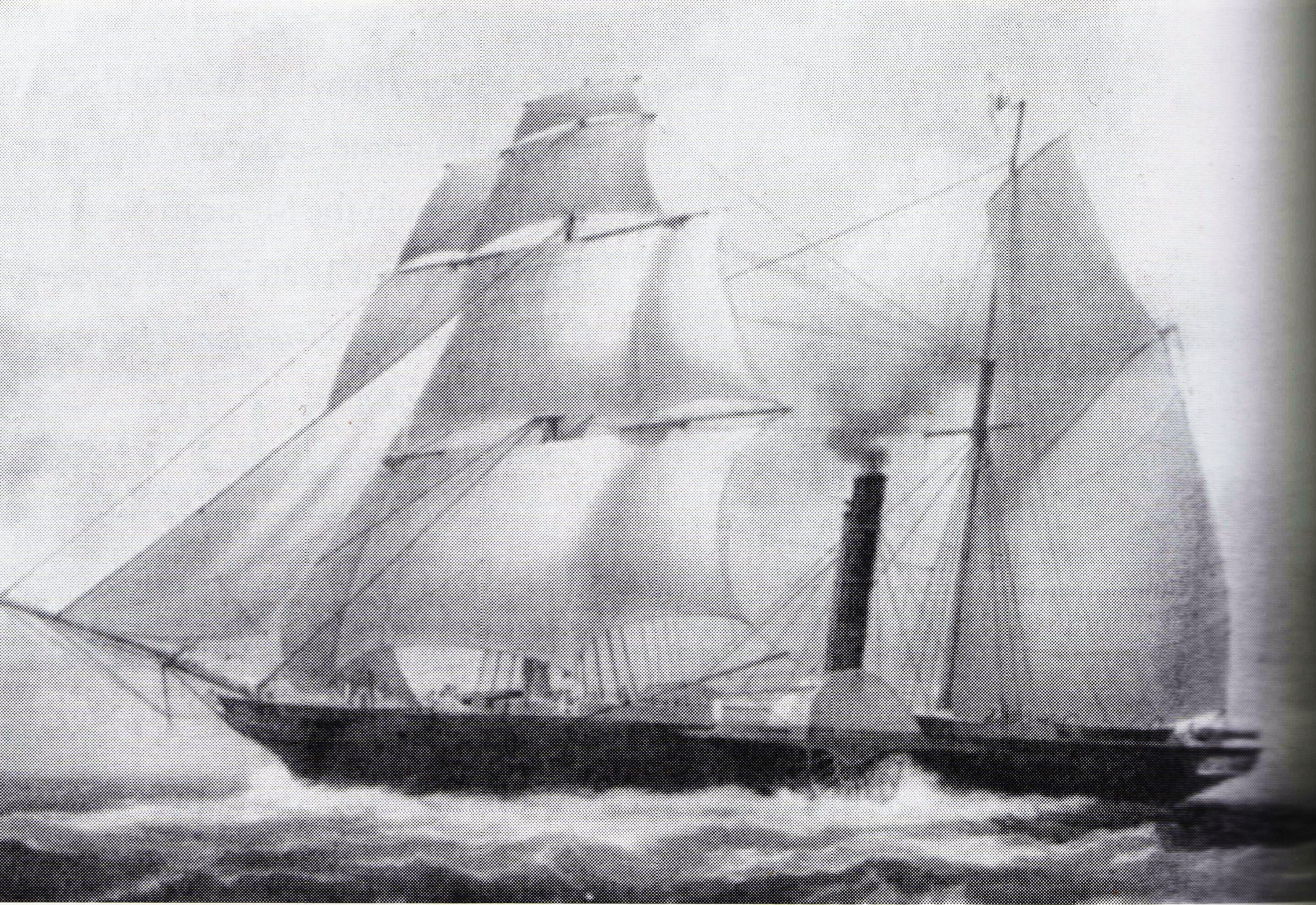
- Hand-coloured lithograph of the Mexican 2-gun paddlewheel frigate 'Guadalupe' under steam and sail in a stiff breeze, with vessels to her right and left. Her deck is lined with figures front and aft. One of her two 68-pounder Pivot Guns is visible in her stern.

History
- Namesake: Guadalupe
- Builder: Jonathan Laird of Birkenhead, England
- Completed: 1842
- Acquired: 1842
- Commissioned: 1842
- Decommissioned: 1847
- Maiden voyage: 1842
- In service: 1842
- Out of service: sold to the Spanish Navy at Cuba in August 1847
- Renamed: León

General characteristics
- Displacement: 878
- Length: 187 ft (57 m)
- Beam: 30 ft (9.1 m)
- Height: 9 ft (2.7 m)
- Installed power: 180 h.p.
- Propulsion: wind and steam
- Speed: 9 knots
- Armament: Gun deck 2 British 24-pounders and 2 British 68-pounder shell guns

The Mexican Navy paddle frigate Guadalupe was the flagship of the Mexican Navy from 1842 to 1847. She participated in the Naval Battle of Campeche in 1843. She was one of the first iron-hulled (hull that was made of wood lined with an iron sheet) warships ever built and one of the first to see action in a naval battle.

== Background of the Mexican Navy ==
The Mexican Navy has its origins in the creation of the Ministry of War in 1821. From that year until 1939 it existed jointly with the Mexican Army in the organic ministry. Since its declaration of independence from Spain in September 1810, through the mid decades of the 19th century, Mexico found itself in a constant state of war, mostly against Spain which had not recognized its independence. Therefore, its priority was to purchase its first fleet from the U.S. in order to displace the last remaining Spanish forces from its coasts.

== Construction of the Guadalupe ==
The Guadalupe, probably named after the national patron, Our Lady of Guadalupe, was built in the Liverpool shipyard of Jonathan Laird of Birkenhead, England, in 1842. Guadalupe was referred to as a steam paddle frigate and had a full brig rig. Guadalupe was 183 feet in length with a displacement of 878 tons. She was the biggest iron warship in the world when built. Due to diplomatic action by the Republic of Texas she was delivered unarmed as a merchant ship with her guns in her hold.

In May 1842, William Kennedy, the Republic of Texas' consul general in London, and Ashbel Smith, minister to England, protested the building of the vessels for Mexican use against Texas and urged the British government to detain them. Lord Aberdeen of the Foreign Office decided that arms might be placed on the vessels so long as they were not mounted in British ports, and Guadaloupe sailed in June despite Texan protests. Aberdeen insisted that the British would maintain strict neutrality in the struggle between Texas and Mexico and that no British military officer would be allowed to serve in the Mexican military against Texas.

When she arrived in Mexico she was equipped with two 68-pounder Paixhans guns which fired explosive shells, two 32-pounder guns and two 24-pounder long guns. A feature that was unusual for the period was her construction with watertight compartmentation throughout her hull, a feature that impressed famous French naval architect Henri Dupuy de Lôme. She carried a crew that included many British nationals, led by her captain Edward Phillip Charlwood, Commander RN, who started while she was building in 1841 and who remained her captain until 1843.

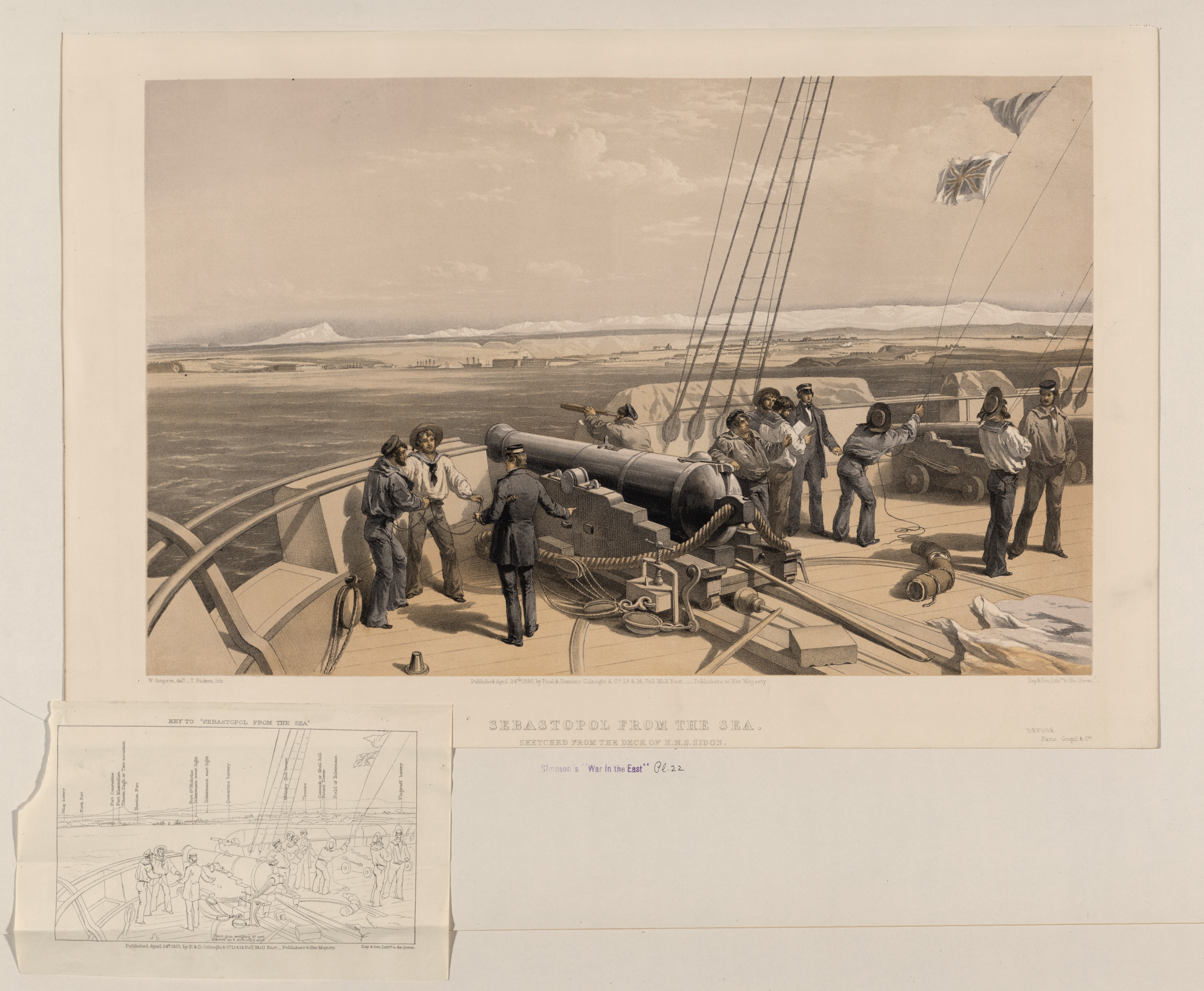
HMS Sidon 68-pounder pivot gun 1855 LOC 05685u

== Career ==
=== Naval Battle of Campeche 30 April 1843 and 16 May 1843 ===
The Mexican fleet now possessed the paddle steam frigates Guadalupe and Montezuma. About 40 of the crew of the Guadalupe were sick with yellow fever. The Texas Navy commander Moore hoped to encounter the Guadalupe separate from her escort Montezuma. Austin and Wharton made for the Yucatán coast and encountered the Mexican squadron on 30 April 1843 between Lerma and Campeche. Montezuma and Guadalupe, along with four smaller vessels, comprised the Mexican fleet. The Texans were augmented by two Yucatecan ships and five small gunboats, but were clearly the smaller fleet. The Mexican shooting at first fell short and then went over the Texas ships. During the two-hour running battle the Austin was struck once in the fighting and lost some of her mizzen rigging and the Guadalupe had 7 dead and the Montezuma 13 dead. After a few hours, the Mexican sailing ships departed and only the two steamers remained. The result was that the Mexican blockade of the port of Campeche was lifted and the Texan ships put into the port for repairs. This first attack was a draw and the fleets separated.

The next event on 16 May 1843 was orchestrated by Commodore Moore and his "Texians" who lured the Mexican Forces into a narrow roadstead, and hounded the Mexican ships away from the harbour firing most of Austin's ammunition as Wharton was not able to engage. The battle toll came out as; "Austin" 3 dead, "Wharton" 2 dead, "Montezuma" 40 dead including her captain and "Guadalupe" 47 dead. The Mexican Fleet was effectively incapacitated. This battle would represent the only time that steam-driven warships would be defeated by sail powered ships. There were numerous falsehoods circulated about Moore's battle with Guadalupe. These seem to be largely the confections of the press, egged on by politicians, and are not to be taken seriously. They include claims to have sunk her.

Her captain, Commander Edward P Charlwood, RN, had his own description of the action. He noted that compared to a wooden ship her damage from shot was much less in part to the action being in warm waters. During the 4 to 5 weeks of the Yucatán campaign she was hit a total of 6 times by 18- or 24-pounder solid shot. He described Guadalupe as a good gun platform and felt that they had hit the Texan sloop-of-war Austin about 12 times with 68-pounder shells causing her to withdraw from the action of 16 May 1843.

=== After Campeche ===
Guadalupe remained in the Armada de Mexico until 1847, by which time the fate of Yucatán had been decided, when she and Montezuma were sold to raise money for the continuing land hostilities with the United States. Her new owners are described by the Armada de Mexico as 'The Spaniards in Havana'. The Spanish Navy Wikipedia entry states that "The first new steam-driven vessels were purchased from Mexico in 1846. These included two frigates, the Guadalupe and the Moctezuma, acquired from the UK in 1842, and a third vessel delivered in 1843. They were sold to Spanish authorities in Cuba by General Antonio López de Santa Anna, in order to raise funds for Mexico's defense from the U.S. invasion in 1846-1848. The Spanish christened the vessels Castilla for Montezuma and León for Guadelupe". In 1849 the Castilla and León were used with two other Spanish steam ships to intervene in Italy along with French forces during the suppressing of the Roman Republic (1849). The steam ships transported 9,000 troops to Italy and provided logistical support for them for months. The resulting recognition from the Pope, Sardinia, Prussia and Austria strengthened the Spanish government versus its rival Carlist faction.
