= Killough massacre =

Native American attack on white settlers in Texas (1838)

- Location: 32°3′17″N 95°20′34″W; Larissa, Cherokee County, Texas
- Date: October 5, 1838
- Attack type: Raid on a frontier settlement
- Deaths: 18 either killed or carried away
- Victims: Killough, Wood, and Williams families
- Perpetrator: Cherokee
- Defender: 8 escaped on horseback
- Motive: Rage over abrogated treaty

The Killough massacre, in which 18 white settlers were either killed or abducted by Cherokee raiders, took place on October 5, 1838, near Larissa, Texas, in the northwestern part of Cherokee County. The 18 victims included Isaac Killough, Sr., and his extended family (viz. the families of four sons and two daughters). They had immigrated to the Republic of Texas from Talladega County, Alabama, in 1837. It is believed to have been both the largest and last such Native American attack on settlers in East Texas.

== Background ==
Apparently unaware that the land made available to them was hotly disputed by the Cherokee Indians who lived in the area, Isaac Killough and his fellow homesteaders began clearing land for crops and building homes. Only a year earlier, however, the area surrounding their settlement had been set aside for the Cherokee under a treaty negotiated and signed by Sam Houston and John Forbes. When the Republic of Texas Senate refused to ratify the treaty and then, in December 1838, formally nullified it, the Cherokee, who already thought they had conceded enough, sought to attack settlers.

The atmosphere in the region became tense in early 1838 with the influx of Anglo settlers into lands inhabited by the Cherokee, added to the residual bitterness among some Hispanics still loyal to Mexico. By the summer of that year, rumblings of coming insurrection arose from either or both of those groups, and evidence of collusion between them surfaced.

== Massacre ==
Fearing this growing unrest, Killough fled with his relatives and friends to Nacogdoches for refuge. Cherokee leaders agreed to their safe passage if they would return only to harvest their crops and leave the area after doing so.

The settlers agreed, but on October 5, 1838, a band of Cherokee who had not been party to the agreement attacked the settlement. Most of the Killough group — a total of 18 — were killed or abducted as they worked their fields. Those who survived fled for a time to Lacy's Fort on the San Antonio Road, just west of present-day Alto, Texas.

According to Tyler, Texas newspaperman Charles Kilpatrick, several of the men walked into an ambush and the Native Americans then:

...shot down Allen and Samuel, George Wood, and Isaac Jr., then swept uphill into the little settlement. Isaac Sr. fell in his yard and Barakias Williams was shot before the eyes of his womenfolk.

Warriors seized two 17-year-old girls, Elizabeth Killough and Elizabeth Williams, Mrs. Allen Killough, Mrs. George Wood, and all the small children. They were carried screaming into the forest, never to be seen again.

Nathaniel Killough and his wife escaped into a canebrake, as did Mrs. Samuel Killough, Mrs. Isaac Killough Sr., Mrs. Isaac Killough Jr., and the baby, William. Three perilous days later, they staggered into Fort Lacy, near Alto.

== See also ==
- List of massacres in the United States
- Cherokee War of 1839
