= Absalom Harris Chappell =

American politician, lawyer (1801–1878)

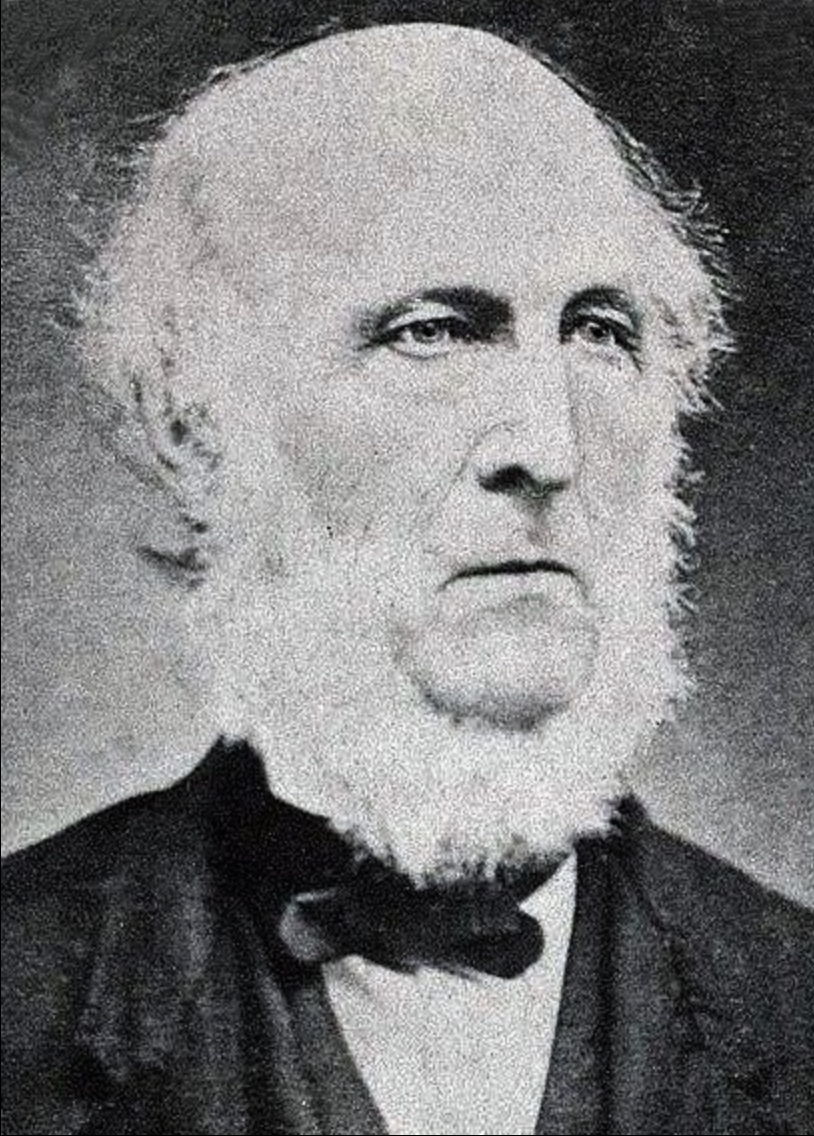

Personal details
- Born: December 18, 1801 Mount Zion, Georgia, U.S.
- Died: December 11, 1878 (aged 76) Columbus, Georgia, U.S.
- Spouse: Loretto Rebecca Lamar
- Children: 5, including Joseph Harris Chappell
- Occupation: Politician, lawyer

Absalom Harris Chappell (December 18, 1801 – December 11, 1878) was an American politician and lawyer. He served in the Georgia House of Representatives, Georgia Senate, and U.S. House of Representatives. He owned slaves.

== Biography ==
Absalom Harris Chappell was born on December 18, 1801, in Mount Zion, Georgia, the oldest son of Joseph and Dorothy Harris Chappell. He attended the University of Georgia in Athens in 1820; however, he did not graduate from the school. Chappell continued the study of law under the tutelage of Augustin Smith Clayton, passed the state bar exam, and became a practicing lawyer.

Chappell was elected as to the Georgia Senate in 1832 and 1833 and served in the Georgia House of Representatives from 1834 through 1839. Upon the resignation of Representative-elect John B. Lamar, Chappell was elected as his replacement in the U.S. House of Representatives in 1843 and served in that position until 1845 when he did not seek re-election. Chappell was subsequently elected to one more term as a state senator in 1845 and served as the president of that body.

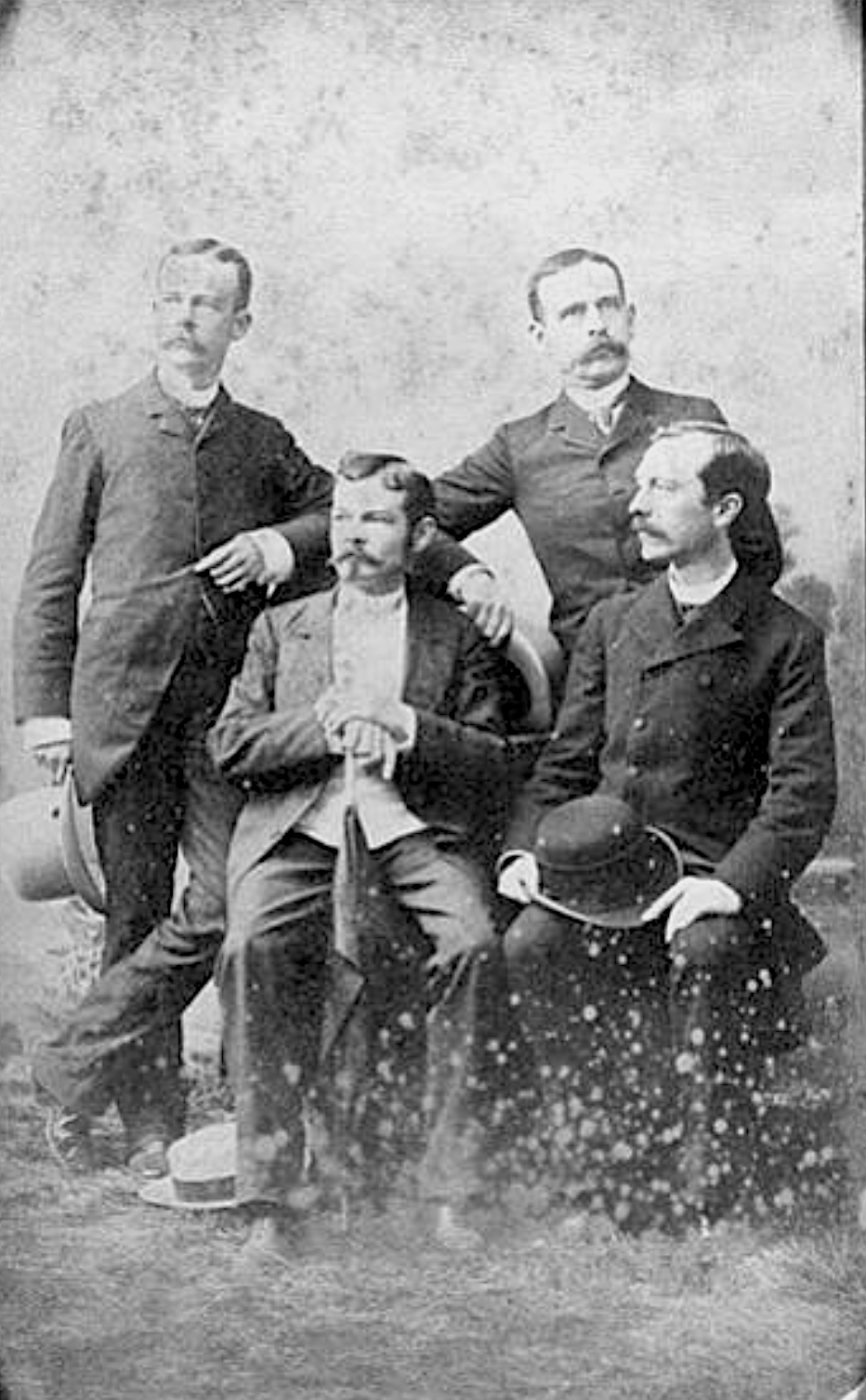
Photograph of the Chappell brothers (from left to right Lucius Henry Chappell, Thomas Jefferson Chappell, Lamar Chappell, and Joseph Harris Chappell)

In 1842, he married Loretto Rebecca Lamar, the younger sister of Judge Lucius Quintus Cincinnatus Lamar (I) and Mirabeau B. Lamar, second President of Texas. The Chappells had five children who survived to adulthood. Their four sons had prominent careers, Joseph Harris Chappell was a president of normal schools, Thomas Jefferson Chappell was a state legislator and judge, and Lucius Henry Chappell was a two-term mayor of Columbus

Chappell died in Columbus, Georgia, on December 11, 1878, and was buried in Linwood Cemetery (also known as Old City Cemetery) in that same city.

U.S. House of Representatives
Preceded by John B. Lamar	Member of the U.S. House of Representatives from Georgia's 7th congressional district October 2, 1843 – March 3, 1845	Succeeded by Alexander Stephens
