= Royle =

Royle is a surname. The surname may derive from Ryal in Northumberland, England.

People:

- Amanda Royle (born 1962), English actress, second daughter of Derek Royle
- Adrian Royle (born 1959), retired English long distance runner
- Anthony Royle, Baron Fanshawe of Richmond (1927–2001), British politician and businessman, son of Lancelot Royle
- Arthur Royle, English rugby union footballer who played in the 1880s
- Arthur Royle (priest) (1895–1973), Church of England Archdeacon of Huntingdon
- Carol Royle (born 1954), English actress, elder daughter of Derek Royle
- Catherine Royle (born 1963), English diplomat and Principal of Somerville College, Oxford
- Charles Royle, Baron Royle (1896–1975), British businessman and politician
- Charles Royle (Liberal politician) (1872–1963), English politician
- David Royle (disambiguation), two people
- Derek Royle (1928–1990), English actor, father of Amanda and Carol Royle
- Edward Royle (born 1944), British historian
- Edwin Milton Royle (1862–1942), American playwright
- Gordon Royle, Australian mathematician and professor
- Guy Royle (1885–1954), Royal Navy admiral, Fifth Sea Lord and First Naval Member of the Royal Australian Navy
- Jen Royle (born 1974), former American sports reporter and chef
- Joe Royle (born 1949), English football player and manager
- John Forbes Royle (1799–1858), British botanist
- Joseph Royle (1732–1766), colonial American newspaper publisher and printer
- Lancelot Royle (1898–1978), British sprinter and businessman, son of Vernon Royle
- Mera Royle (born 1999), harpist and composer
- Nicholas Royle (born 1963), English novelist, editor, publisher and literary reviewer
- Nick Royle (born 1983), English rugby union players
- Pam Royle (born 1958), British television presenter and journalist
- Paul Royle (1914–2015), Australian Royal Air Force pilot, one of the last two survivors of the Second World War "Great Escape" from a German POW camp
- Roger Royle (born 1939), Anglican priest and television presenter
- Selena Royle (1904–1983), American actress, daughter of Edwin Royle
- Stanley Royle (1888–1961), English landscape painter and illustrator
- Timothy Royle (1931–2021), businessman, son of Lancelot Royle
- Vernon Royle (1854–1929), English cricketer

Fictional characters:

- the title characters in The Royle Family, a television comedy series
- Joan Daisy Royle, in That Royle Girl, a 1925 film directed by D. W. Griffith
- Eddie Royle (EastEnders), in the soap opera EastEnders
- John Royle (EastEnders), in the soap opera EastEnders

== See also ==
- Royal (name), a list of people with the surname or given name
