= Joseph Harris Chappell =

American university president, educator (1849–1906)

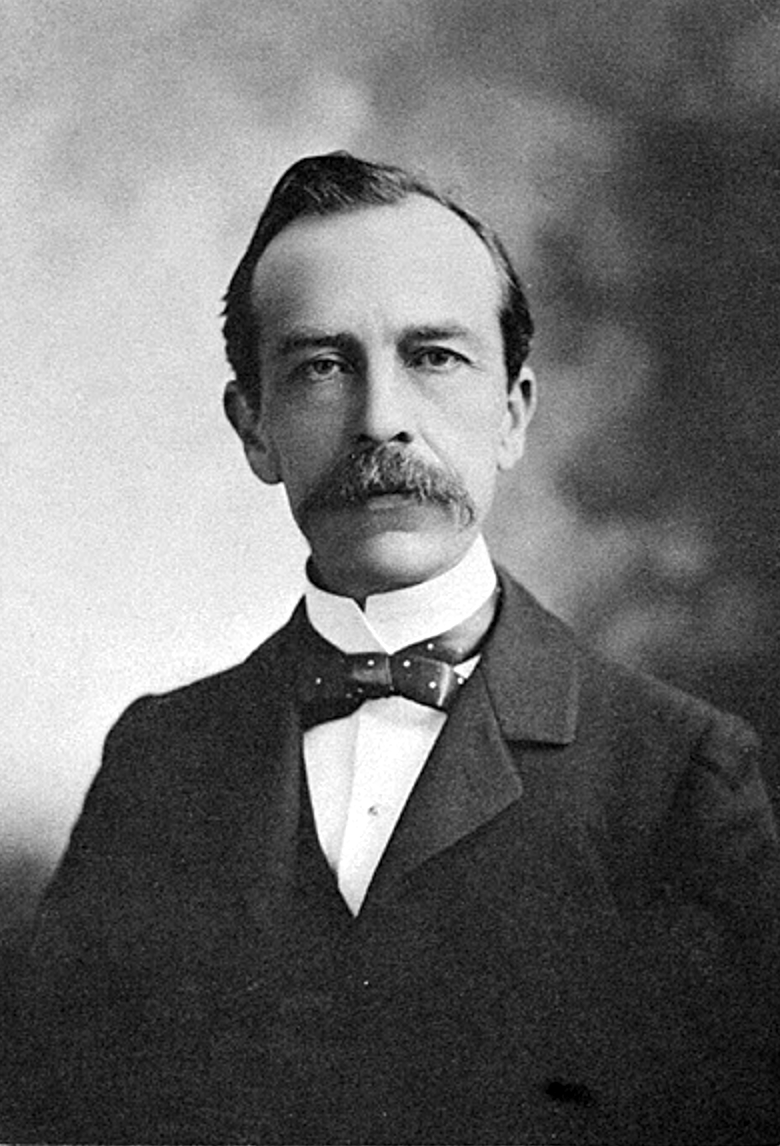

1st President of Georgia College & State University
- In office summer 1891 – 1905
- Succeeded by: Marvin M. Parks

President of Chappell College for Women
- In office 1886–1891

2nd President of Jacksonville State University
- In office 1885–1886
- Preceded by: James G. Ryals Jr.
- Succeeded by: Carleton Bartlett Gibson

Personal details
- Born: October 1849 Macon, Georgia, U.S.
- Died: April 6, 1906 (aged 57) Columbus, Georgia, U.S.
- Spouse(s): Carrie Browne, Ella Kincaid
- Relations: Absalom Harris Chappell (father), Lucius Quintus Cincinnatus Lamar I (maternal uncle), Mirabeau B. Lamar (maternal uncle)
- Children: 4
- Education: University of Virginia
- Occupation: Educator, pedagogue, curriculum designer, author, college president

Joseph Harris Chappell (October 1849 – April 6, 1906) was an American educator, pedagogue, curriculum designer, author, and college president. He served as the first president of Georgia Normal and Industrial College (now Georgia College & State University) in Milledgeville, Georgia, from 1891 to 1905. He oversaw the building of the college campus and its curriculum.

== Early life ==
Joseph Harris Chappell was born in October 1849 in Macon, Georgia, to parents Absalom Harris Chappell and Loretta Lamar Chappell. He was of English and French heritage, with many of his paternal relatives settling in Virginia in 1650. His father was a politician and lawyer who had served in the Georgia House of Representatives, Georgia Senate, and United States House of Representatives.

He had five siblings. His brother Lucius Henry Chappell (1853–1928) served two terms as mayor of Columbus, Georgia. Another brother, Thomas Jefferson Chappell (1851–1910), was a lawyer, judge, and two term member of the Georgia House of Representatives. Chappell was primarily raised in the city, with two years in childhood spent on his father's cotton plantation in Georgia.

He attended the University of Virginia for one year, and never graduated.

== Career ==
Chappell started his career as a teacher in a country school in Clinton, Georgia in 1872. From 1880 until 1883, he was an assistant teacher at the Columbus Female College. Chappell had a brief tenure as the 2nd president of Jacksonville State Normal School (now Jacksonville State University) in Jacksonville, Alabama. After the 1885 death of president James G. Ryals Jr., Chappell served for one year in the role of president. From 1886 until 1891, he was the president of Chappell College for Women (also known as Chappell's College) in Columbus, Georgia, a successor of the Columbus Female College after it burned down in 1884.

From 1891 until 1905, Chappell was the president of Georgia Normal and Industrial College (now Georgia College & State University), until he stepped down due to ill health. He oversaw the building of the Georgia Normal and Industrial College campus and its curriculum.

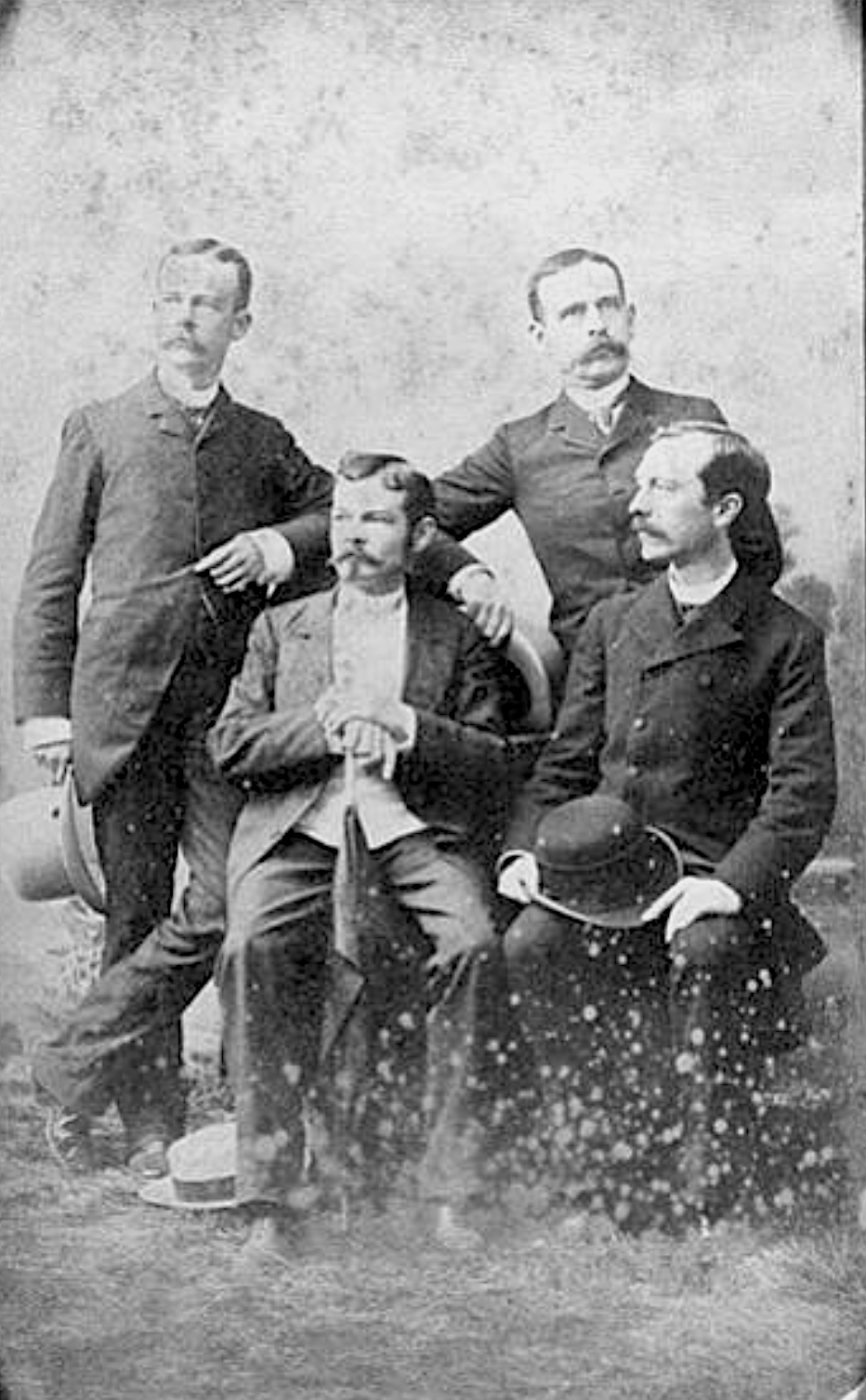
Photograph of the Chappell brothers (from left to right Lucius Henry Chappell, Thomas Jefferson Chappell, Lamar Chappell, and Joseph Harris Chappell)

Chappell published the book Georgia History Stories (1905), which features 20 chapters on the history of the state of Georgia.

He was married twice, first to Carrie Browne in 1883, who died in 1886 without children; and later to Ella Kincaid in 1891, and they had four children.

Chappell died on April 6, 1906, in Columbus, Georgia after a long illness. Chappell is included as part of the "Vanishing Georgia" collection at the Georgia Archives, with a portrait of him taken in 1903, and a photograph with his three brothers from c. 1890s.

== Publications ==
- Chappell, J. Harris (1905). Georgia History Stories. New York City, New York: Silver Burdett and Company.
- Chappell, J. Harris (1905). Baccalaureate Addresses of J. Harris Chappell, A. M., Ph.D: Delivered Before the Graduating Classes of the Georgia Normal and Industrial College, Milledgeville, Ga;, For the Years 1891 1904, Inclusive. Alumnae Association of the Georgia Normal and Industrial College. Atlanta, GA: Franklin Printing and Publishing Co. hdl:2027/loc.ark:/13960/t4cn7vq46.
