= Ryal =

Ryal may refer to:

== Places ==
- Ryal, Northumberland, England

== Currency ==
- Rose Ryal, an English gold coin equal to 30 shillings
- Spur ryal, an English gold coin equal to 15 shillings
- Zanzibari ryal, the currency of Zanzibar between 1882 and 1908

== People ==
- Mark Ryal (born 1960), an American baseball player
- Rusty Ryal (born 1983), an American baseball player

== Sports brand ==
- Ryal, handmade Italian football boots

== See also ==
- Ryall (disambiguation)
- Ryals (surname)
