= Thomas Chappell =

Thomas Chappell may refer to:

- Tom Chappell, CEO of Tom's of Maine
- Thomas Patey Chappell, 19th century British music publisher of the firm Chappell & Co.
- Thomas Jefferson Chappell, 19th century politician and member of the Georgia House of Representatives for two terms.
