= Ryall =

Ryall may refer to:

== People ==
- Chris Ryall (born 1969), American writer and editor in the comic book industry
- Daniel Bailey Ryall (1798–1864), American politician
- David Ryall (1935–2014), English actor
- Dee Ryall (born 1967), Australian politician
- George Ryall (born 1958), English professional golfer
- Henry Thomas Ryall (1811–1867), English engraver
- James Ryall (born 1980), Irish hurler
- John Ryall (1875–1953), New Zealand politician
- Rhiannon Ryall (active from 1983), pseudonym of an English-born Australian Wiccan
- Richard Ryall (born 1959), South African cricketer
- Sebastian Ryall (born 1989), Australian association football player
- Tony Ryall (born 1964), New Zealand politician
- William Bolitho Ryall (1891–1930), South African journalist, writer and biographer

== Places ==
- Ryall, Dorset, England
- Ryall, Worcestershire, England
- Ryal, Northumberland, England

== See also ==
- Riall, a given name and surname
- Ryal (disambiguation)
- Ryals (surname)
- Joe Ryalls (1881-1956), English professional footballer
- Ryhall, Rutland
