= Ryals =

Ryals is a surname. Notable people with the surname include:

- James G. Ryals Jr. (1855–1885), American educator and university president
- John Ryals (1933–2017), American politician and attorney

== See also ==
- Ryal (disambiguation)
- Ryall (disambiguation)
