= Royal (name) =

Royal can be a surname or a given name. Bearers include:

== Surname ==
- Billy Joe Royal (1942–2015), American country music and pop singer
- Calvin Royal III, American ballet dancer
- Darrell Royal (1924–2012), former football coach and player
- Devin Royal (born 2004), American basketball player
- Donald Royal (born 1966), retired National Basketball Association player
- Doyle P. Royal (1919–2020), American tennis and soccer coach
- Easton Royal (born 2009), American football player
- Eddie Royal (born 1985), National Football League player
- Ernie Royal (1921–1983), American jazz trumpeter
- Frank S. Royal (1939-2026), American physician, company director and civic leader
- Jesse Royal (rugby league) (born 1980), New Zealand rugby league player
- Marshal Royal (1912–1995), American clarinetist and alto saxophonist
- Matthew J. Royal (1863–1900), Canadian novelist and playwright
- Robert Royal (born 1979), National Football League player
- Ségolène Royal (born 1953), French socialist politician
- William R. Royal (1905–1997), American underwater diver

== Given name ==
- Roy Castleton (1885–1967), American Major League Baseball relief pitcher, first Mormon in the major leagues
- Royal Dano (1922–1994), American actor
- Royal Galipeau (1947–2018), Canadian Conservative Member of Parliament
- Royal Harbor (born 1975), stage name Knoc-turn'al, American songwriter and rapper
- Royal Ivey (born 1981), American basketball player
- Royal Wade Kimes (born 1951), American country music singer
- Royal Little (1896–1989), American businessman considered the father of conglomerates
- Royal Raymond Rife (1888-1971), American inventor
- Royal Robbins (1935–2017), American rock climbing pioneer
- Royal Robertson (1936–1997), American artist
- Royal Russell Long (1935–1993), American kidnapper, rapist and suspected serial killer
- Royal Skousen (born 1945), American professor of linguistics and English
- Royal Sprague (1814–1872), 11th Chief Justice of California
- Royal A. Stone (1875–1942), Minnesota Supreme Court justice

== See also ==
- Royle, a list of people and fictional characters with the surname
- Royle Stillman (born 1951), former Major League Baseball player
