= Lucius Cincinnatus =

Lucius Cincinnatus may refer to:

- Lucius Quinctius Cincinnatus, ancient Roman politician of the 5th and 6th centuries BC
- Lucius Quintus Cincinnatus Lamar I (1797–1834), father of Lucius Quintus Cincinnatus Lamar (II) and a Georgia jurist
- Lucius Quintus Cincinnatus Lamar (1825–1893), U.S. Supreme Court Associate Justice
