= Murder of Carolyn Eaton =

Formerly unidentified murder victim

Carolyn Eaton
- Retouched photo of Eaton
- Born: Carolyn Celeste Eaton; October 1, 1964
- Disappeared: c. December 25, 1981; Bellefontaine Neighbors, Missouri, U.S.
- Died: c. February 1982 (aged 17); Williams, Arizona, U.S.
- Cause of death: Homicide by suffocation
- Body discovered: February 14, 1982
- Burial place: Mountain View Cemetery, Williams, Arizona, U.S.
- Other names: Valentine Sally, Coconino County Jane Doe
- Height: 5 ft 4 in (1.63 m) – 5 ft 5 in (1.65 m) (approximate)

Carolyn Celeste Eaton (October 1, 1964 – c. February 1982), previously known as Valentine Sally, was a formerly unidentified American teenager from Bellefontaine Neighbors, Missouri, who was found murdered along Interstate 40 in Williams, Arizona, on Valentine's Day 1982. The young woman had been last seen alive with an unidentified older man on February 4, 1982, at the Monte Carlo Truck Stop near Ash Fork, Arizona.

Despite initial efforts to identify her and solve her murder, the investigation into Eaton's murder became a cold case. Numerous efforts were made to determine her identity, including forensic facial reconstructions of her face.

On February 22, 2021, Eaton's identification was confirmed by investigators via genetic genealogy. Prior to her 2021 identification, Eaton was best known as "Valentine Sally" due to being found on Valentine's Day.

== Discovery ==
On February 14, 1982, the decomposing body of a young woman was found by an Arizona state trooper searching for a tire that came off a passing truck. She was lying face down under a cedar tree along the Interstate 40 at mile marker 151.8 in Williams, Arizona. The victim was found dressed only in size 8 or 9 blue jeans with the brand name "Seasons", a white sweater with thin red or maroon stripes, a size 36c white bra, and a white handkerchief lay nearby. The victim's jeans had torn belt loops suggesting that she had been dragged 25 feet off the roadway to the site of her discovery. No shoes or socks were found with the remains.

=== Autopsy ===
Valentine Sally was estimated to be 5 ft 4 in (1.63 m) to 5 ft 5 in (1.65 m) in height and weighed between 120–125 pounds (54–57 kg). Her eyes were described as blue by witnesses who saw the victim alive. The victim's hair was approximately 9.5 inches (240 mm) in length and either blonde or strawberry-blonde in color. Irregular and rough well-healed scars were found on the top of her left foot measuring 3.5 centimetres (1.4 in) and 1.4 centimetres (0.55 in) in length. A diagonal scar was also found on the anterior (back) lower thigh, measuring 3.5 centimetres (1.4 in) in length. Moles were found on her chest above the right breast.

The medical examiner determined that Valentine Sally was murdered about 2 weeks prior to discovery. The cause of death couldn't be determined due to decomposition and insect/wildlife activity on her face, head, and neck area. However, the medical examiner believed that she died of suffocation or asphyxiation because her hyoid bone wasn't broken and there was no other trauma to her body. Valentine Sally's right ear was missing due to it being torn off by wildlife. The autopsy also revealed that a left lower molar (Tooth #19) had been drilled in preparation for a root canal about 1 week before the victim died. A dissolved aspirin was located in that tooth's cavity, which indicated that she still had issues with it. Teeth #1, 16, 17, and 32 were not erupted.

== Investigation ==
=== Sightings ===
According to the Doe Network, a Northern Arizona University student believed that he gave a ride to a girl matching Valentine Sally's description on February 2, 1982, near Cordes Junction. This girl told him that she came from Phoenix where she lived with friends and worked as a dishwasher there. She also said that she needed to go to New Jersey due to family problems and that she was planning to head to the Little America truck stop in Flagstaff to try and get a ride from a truck driver to the East Coast.

On February 4, 1982, a witness named Patty Wilkins saw Valentine Sally entering her family's Monte Carlo Truck Stop with a much older truck driver. Wilkins found it unusual that a teenager was outside at that time of the morning with an older man, so she asked the girl if she felt safe and if she felt like staying at the truck stop. Valentine Sally insisted on staying with the truck driver. The man ordered breakfast, but Valentine Sally refused to eat due to a toothache which concerned her companion. Wilkins crushed up an aspirin tablet into a powder and applied it on Valentine Sally's affected tooth. The girl is estimated to have died within hours of this sighting due to the aspirin still being on the tooth when she was discovered. Wilkins was able to identify Valentine Sally as the girl she had assisted when detectives showed her photos of the clothes found alongside the body.

== Ongoing investigation ==
=== Erroneous identification ===
In July 1984, Valentine Sally was misidentified as Melody Eugenia Cutlip, a runaway from Istachatta, Florida. Cutlip had been reported missing by her mother in 1980. A forensic odontologist from Albuquerque, New Mexico had determined that bite marks from both girls were a match. In addition, a facial reconstruction of the victim matched Cutlip's appearance. However, Cutlip's mother refused the body claiming that Valentine Sally wasn't her daughter. Cutlip was reunited with her family in Jacksonville, Florida in the summer of 1986.

=== Facial reconstructions ===
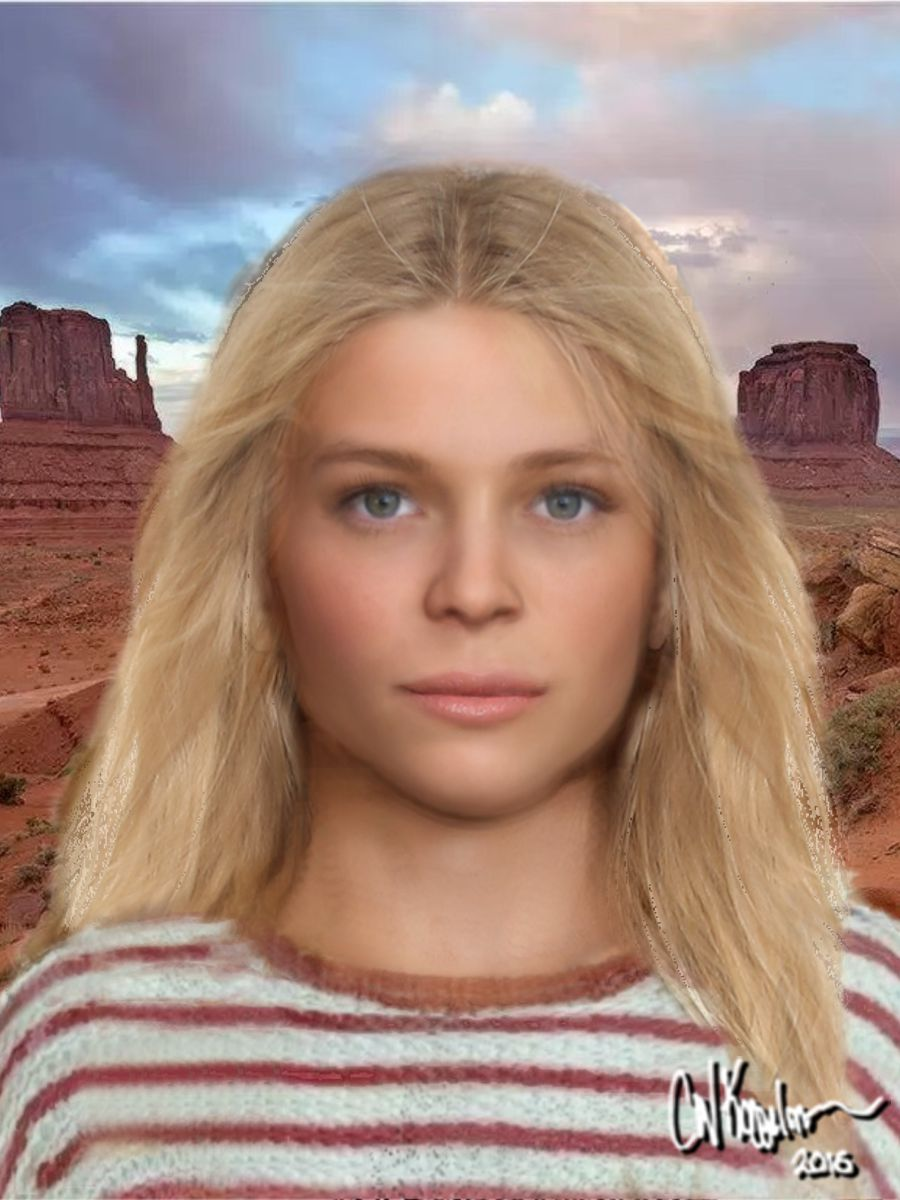
Forensic reconstruction of Valentine Sally by Carl Koppelman.

Several other facial reconstructions were created in addition to the one used in the 1984 misidentification. A sketch of the victim was made 4 days after she was found with the assistance of Wilkins' description of her. The National Center for Missing and Exploited Children later created and released two facial reconstructions made from CT scans of the victim's skull. Carl Koppelman, a California artist, made his own reconstruction based on these scans.

==== Sketch and description of truck driver ====
Patty Wilkins estimated the age of the truck driver seen with Valentine Sally to be somewhere in his 50's. The man was of medium build and was approximately five feet eight to five feet ten inches in height. He wore a two-toned checker patterned leather vest and a black felt cowboy hat with a peacock feather attached. A sketch of him was later created using Wilkins' eyewitness account. It has been speculated by online sleuths that the sketch and description could match suspected serial killer Royal Russell Long, but a connection has not been established by investigators. Long is believed to have traveled through the Interstate 40 after he murdered Cinda Pallet and Charlotte Kinsey in September 1981. Long was sentenced for their murders in August 1985. He died of a heart attack in prison in 1993 having never confessed to Valentine Sally's murder.

== Identification ==
In 2005, Valentine Sally's case was assigned to the Cold Case Squad, a special division of the Coconino County Sheriff's Office. The group consisted of volunteers of whom all had law enforcement backgrounds. The principal investigators on this case were Chuck Jones, Jana White, and Joe Sumner. Jones, a retired FBI agent, eventually left for health reasons, but he was credited for keeping the case alive. The group heard about the case of the Golden State Killer who was identified through genetic genealogy and felt that Valentine Sally could be identified through this process. They teamed up with Barbara Rae Venter, the genealogist who identified the Golden State Killer, to identify the victim. The group submitted one of Valentine Sally's blood samples to extract DNA and then the DNA was submitted to DNA databases used by public access sites for people to build their family trees.

A match was found on Valentine Sally's tree of which the Cold Case Squad determined to be a cousin. They worked down to one branch of a family in St. Louis, Missouri who had several girls among them. They then attempted to determine the presence of these girls on database searches. All of them were accounted for except for one who vanished from records around 1979. This girl had a history of being a runaway and there were juvenile records belonging to her that were never expunged. The Cold Case Squad concluded that the girl was Valentine Sally.

On February 22, 2021, the Coconino County Sheriff's Office publicly announced the identity of Valentine Sally as 17-year-old Carolyn Celeste Eaton of Bellefontaine Neighbors, Missouri. Around Christmas 1981, Eaton's family came home to find her with two other men they didn't know. An argument ensued and Eaton walked out the front door never to be seen or heard from again. It's believed that Eaton got to Arizona through hitchhiking.

The investigation into Eaton's murder is ongoing. Detectives are investigating any leads they've received. They are pursuing information about the truck driver Eaton was seen with. Patty Wilkins, the witness who last saw Eaton, requested to investigators, "Find out who did it and let me go stomp on his toes, OK?".

== See also ==
- Crime in Arizona
- Lists of solved missing person cases
- List of unsolved murders (1980–1999)
