= Mirabeau B. Lamar =

American politician (1798–1859)

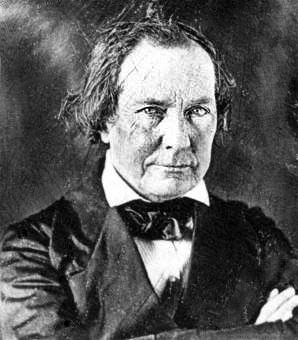

2nd President of the Republic of Texas
- In office December 10, 1838 – December 13, 1841
- Vice President: David G. Burnet
- Preceded by: Sam Houston
- Succeeded by: Sam Houston

1st Vice President of the Republic of Texas
- In office October 22, 1836 – December 10, 1838
- President: Sam Houston
- Preceded by: Lorenzo de Zavala (interim)
- Succeeded by: David G. Burnet

4th United States Ambassador to Nicaragua
- In office February 8, 1858 – May 20, 1859
- President: James Buchanan
- Preceded by: John H. Wheeler
- Succeeded by: Alexander Dimitry

3rd United States Ambassador to Costa Rica
- In office September 14, 1858 – May 20, 1859
- President: James Buchanan
- Preceded by: Solon Borland
- Succeeded by: Alexander Dimitry

Personal details
- Born: August 16, 1798 Louisville, Georgia, U.S.
- Died: December 19, 1859 (aged 61) Richmond, Texas, U.S.
- Resting place: Morton Cemetery, Richmond, Texas; 29.5858°N 95.7633°W
- Party: Democratic-Republican Party; Democratic Party
- Spouse(s): Tabitha Jordan Lamar (1826-1830; her death); Henrietta Maffitt (m.1851)
- Relations: Lucius Q. C. Lamar (brother); Lucius Q. C. Lamar II Thomas Jefferson Chappell Joseph Harris Chappell (nephews); John Basil Lamar (cousin); Mary Ann Lamar Cobb (cousin)
- Children: Rebecca Ann Lamar (born c. 1827); Loretto Evalina Lamar

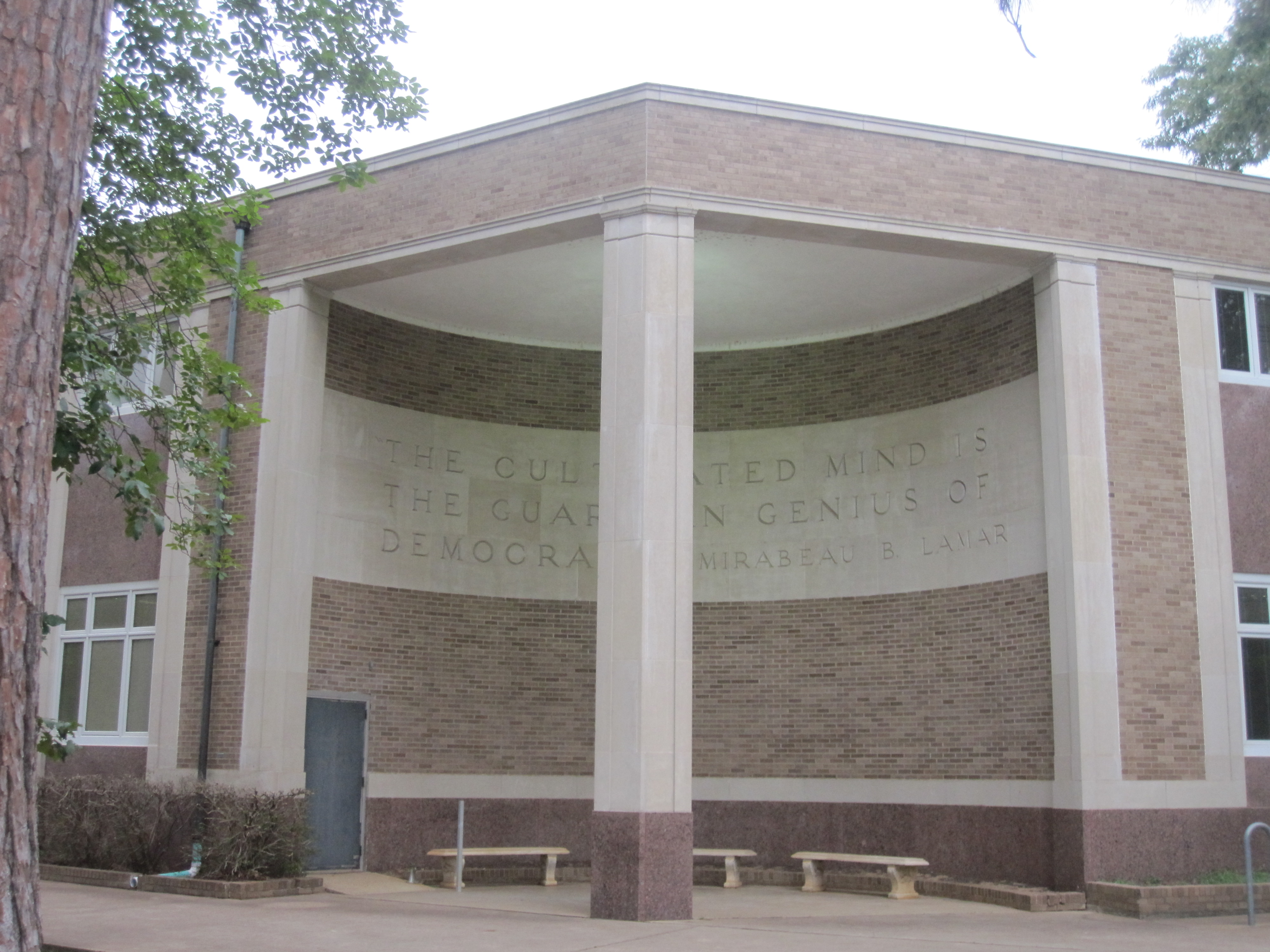
Mirabeau Lamar monument at Stephen F. Austin State University in Nacogdoches, Texas, reads: "The cultivated mind is the guardian genius of democracy."

Mirabeau Buonaparte Lamar (August 16, 1798 – December 19, 1859) was an American attorney, politician, poet, and leading political figure during the Texas Republic era. He served as the second president of the Republic of Texas after Sam Houston, from 1838 to 1841.

He was known for advocating and conducting genocidal wars of extermination against the Native Americans of Texas, especially the Cherokee and Comanche peoples. He also established a fund to support public education.

== Early life ==
Lamar was born in 1798 in Louisville, Georgia, then capital of the state, as the second eldest of nine siblings, growing up at Fairfield, his father's cotton plantation near Milledgeville, then the later state capital. His family was descended from French Huguenot Thomas Lamar, who had settled in Maryland in 1660. His parents, John and Rebecca (Lamar) Lamar, who were first cousins through Thomas' sons John and Thomas, had allowed his mother's brother Zachariah to name their sons; he named them after his favorite historical heroes. The elder brother, Lucius, was named for the Roman statesman Lucius Quinctius Cincinnatus; the younger, Mirabeau Buonaparte Lamar, for French heroes Napoleon Bonaparte and Honoré Gabriel Riqueti, comte de Mirabeau. The family had connections with other families throughout Georgia and the South. Confederate politician John Basil Lamar was a first cousin to Lamar. As a child, Lamar loved to read. Although he was accepted to Princeton University (then called the College of New Jersey), he chose not to attend. He started work as a merchant and then ran a newspaper, but both of those enterprises failed. In 1823, Lamar's family connections helped him to gain a position as the private secretary to the newly elected Georgia Governor George M. Troup. In this position, Lamar issued press releases and toured the state, giving speeches on behalf of the governor. On one of his trips, he met Tabitha Burwell Jordan, whom he married in 1826. They had a daughter together.

When Troup lost his re-election bid in 1828, Lamar moved with his family to Columbus, Georgia, where he established the Columbus Enquirer. This venture was much more successful than his previous business attempts. In 1830, his wife Tabitha died of tuberculosis. Lamar was deeply affected and took time to recover his drive. He withdrew his name from consideration for re-election to the Georgia Senate, in which he had served one term.

After traveling, Lamar began to study law. He was admitted to the bar in 1833 and ran an unsuccessful campaign for a seat in the U.S. Congress.

== Texas Revolution ==
Lamar's brother Lucius committed suicide in 1834. A grief-stricken Lamar began traveling again to ease his sorrow. In the summer of 1835, he reached Texas, then part of Mexico. He decided to stay, where he was visiting his friend James Fannin. Fannin had recently settled there and was working as a slave trader in Velasco.

After a trip back to Georgia, Lamar returned to Texas. Learning of a battle for independence, he traveled with his horse and sword to join Sam Houston's army in spring 1836, and distinguished himself with bravery at the Battle of San Jacinto. On the eve of the battle, Lamar courageously rescued two surrounded Texians, an act that drew a salute from the Mexican lines. One of those rescued was Thomas Jefferson Rusk, later appointed as Texas Secretary of War. Lamar was promoted that night from private to colonel and given command of the cavalry during the battle the following day.

Houston noted in his battle report: "Our cavalry, 61 in number, commanded by Mirabeau B. Lamar, (whose gallant and daring conduct on the previous day, had attracted the admiration of his comrades and called him to that station), placed on our right, completed our line."

After Texas achieved independence from Mexico, Lamar was appointed as the Secretary of War in the interim Texian government. In 1836, he was elected to the position of Vice President of Texas.

== President of Texas ==
Lamar, the unanimous choice as the nominee of the Democratic Party for the president to succeed Houston, was elected. He was inaugurated on December 1, 1838. Houston talked for three hours in his farewell address, "which so unnerved Lamar that he was unable to read his inaugural speech." It was given by his aide, Algernon P. Thompson. Lamar's vice president was David G. Burnet.

Several weeks later, in his first formal address to the Texas Congress, Lamar urged that the Cherokee and Comanche tribes be driven from their lands in Texas, even if the tribes had to be destroyed. He proposed to create a national bank and to secure a loan from either the United States or Europe. Finally, he stated his opposition to potential annexation to the United States and desire to gain recognition of the Republic of Texas by European nations.

He ordered attacks against the Indian tribes. In 1839, Texian troops drove the Cherokee bands from the state. Houston's friend, Chief Bowles, was killed in battle, and Houston was furious with Lamar. The government conducted a similar campaign against the Comanche. Although losing many lives, the Comanche resisted leaving the area. Lamar believed the "total extinction" of the Indian tribes was necessary to make the lands available to whites. He drove the Indians out at the Battle of the Neches, where 500 Texans attacked 800 American Indians of several different tribes. Of these 800, between 400 and 500 were women, children, and elders. The Texians and Rangers who attacked the tribes were fully armed, while the Indians had an estimated 16–24 rifles and pistols. Before the attack, Duwali, Gatunwali, Big Mush, and other chiefs and leaders asked for time to gather their crops, then they would go in peace, but Lamar would not wait.. Lamar ordered Secretary of War Albert Sidney Johnston and General Thomas J. Rusk to run them out of Texas.

Lamar appointed a commission to select a permanent site for the capital of the Republic. After two months of debate, they recommended the small town of Waterloo, along the Colorado River toward the center of the state. The town was renamed Austin after the pioneer Stephen F. Austin. By October 1839, all of the records and employees were relocated there from Houston. That same year, Lamar founded the Texas State Library.

During his administration, Lamar sent three separate agents to Mexico to negotiate a peace settlement, all of which failed. Lamar failed to gain official recognition for Texas from Great Britain, France, and Belgium; it always eluded the would-be nation. He did succeed in getting the three nations to send observers, who would provisionally investigate the issue. He did not succeed in getting loans approved from them. To fill the treasury, he authorized issuance of a large amount of Republic of Texas paper money, known as Redbacks. The paper money was virtually worthless. Spending doubled during Lamar's term, and combined with the worthless currency, caused financial difficulties for the government.

Lamar wanted the Rio Grande to be the western boundary of Texas. He wanted to send an expedition to New Mexico to conquer it, and convince the residents, still loyal to Mexico, to join the Republic. The Texas Congress refused to fund the expedition in 1839 and 1840. In June 1841, Lamar took $89,000 from the treasury and sent an expedition on his own initiative. It was questioned on constitutional grounds. Its members were arrested when they reached Santa Fe, and were told they would soon be released. Instead, under guard, they were marched to prison in Mexico City, and many died during the journey.

Lamar has been called "the Father of Texas Education" because of his provisions of land to support it. During his administration, he convinced the legislature to set aside three leagues of land in each county to be devoted to school development. He also allotted 50 leagues of land for the support of two universities, later developed as Texas A&M University (1876), under the Morrill Act, and The University of Texas (1883). Although no facilities were constructed during his term, he provided the base for a statewide public school system. Government gave 18,000 acres of public land for public schools. He wanted education to be a priority to cultivate a knowledgeable citizenry.

In keeping with other slave societies in the South, Texas prohibited free blacks from schools. A public school system was not firmly established until after the American Civil War, when the Reconstruction era legislature created an endowment to finance a school system. In 1869, it passed a law to give the public school fund the proceeds from sale of public lands. The constitution of that year authorized the legislature to establish school districts and appoint directors. Freedmen's children were included in the system, despite much opposition.

When Lamar left office in 1841, Texas was almost $7 million in debt compared to $1.4 million when he was inaugurated in 1838. The majority of the debt was accrued from carrying out his policies.

== Later years ==
Coat of arms of Mirabeau B. Lamar

Houston was elected again as president after Lamar. The latter returned to service in the army, and distinguished himself in the U.S. Army at the Battle of Monterrey during the Mexican–American War. During this time, money was tight in Texas; Lamar borrowed money from his banker cousin Gazaway Bugg Lamar. Some of the letters on this subject between the two still exist. In late 1847, he was assigned as a post commander at Laredo, but disliked the job, as he wanted more action.

Lamar was elected from Eagle Pass in the Texas Legislature for several years after Texas was annexed to the United States in 1845. In 1857, President James Buchanan appointed Lamar as the Minister to Nicaragua, and a few months later to Costa Rica. He served in Managua for 20 months before returning to Texas in October 1859 because of poor health. He died of a heart attack at his Richmond plantation on December 19, 1859.

Lamar's volume of collected poems, Verse Memorials, was published in 1857 (New York, W.P. Fetridge & Co., 224 pages

== Legacy ==
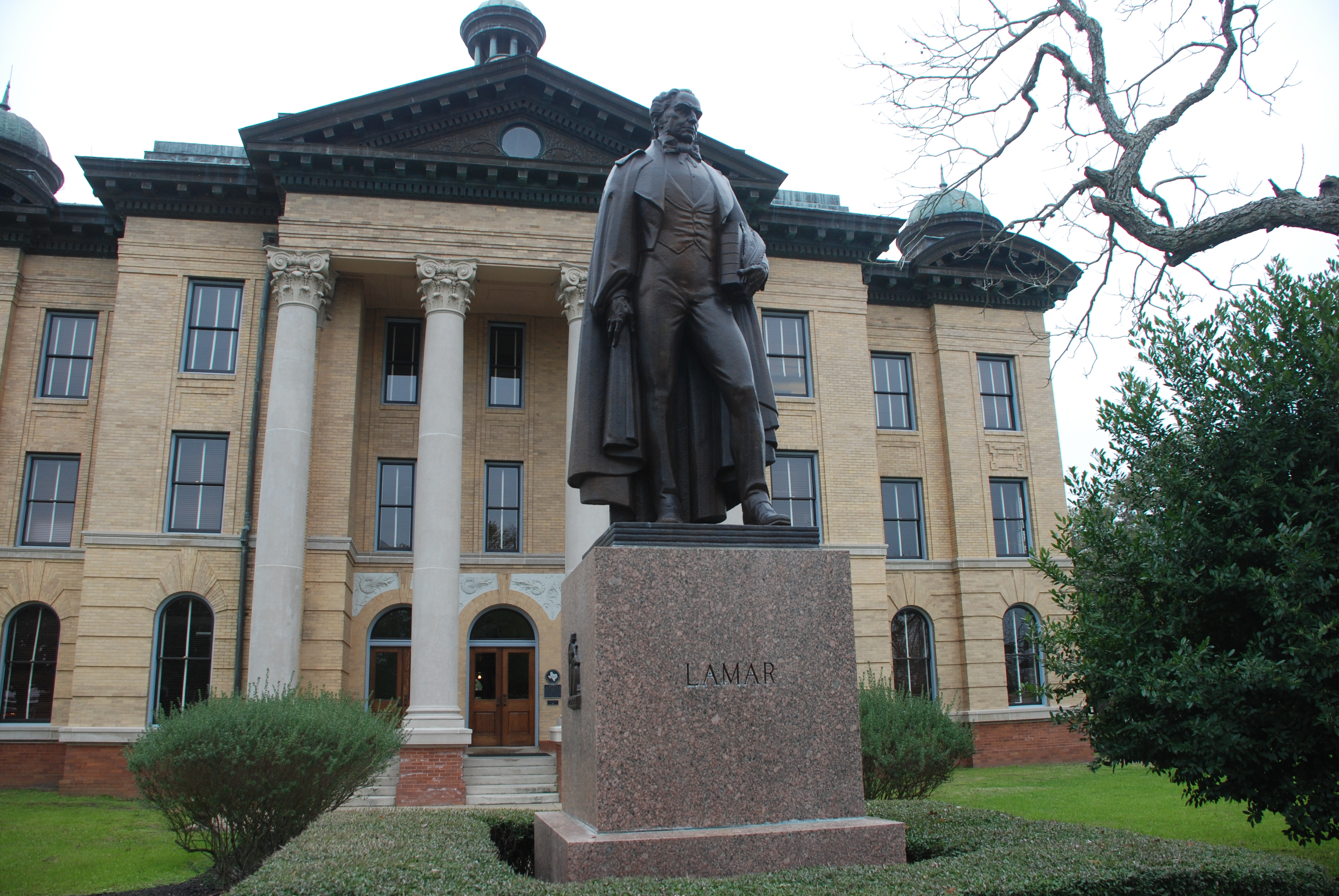
Mirabeau Lamar monument at the Fort Bend County Courthouse in Richmond, Texas.

- Lamar County, in northeast Texas, and Lamar, a small unincorporated community in Aransas County on the Texas Gulf Coast, are named for him. Dallas and Houston have a prominent Lamar Street in their downtown areas. Lamar Boulevard, a major thoroughfare in central Austin, also carries his name, as do other streets in many older communities across Texas.
- Mirabeau B. Lamar is the namesake of Lamar, Missouri birthplace of Harry S. Truman.
- Lamar University in Beaumont was named for him in 1932. It is the largest educational facility to be named for the former Texas President, and has an enrollment of over 17,000 students. The campus features a commemorative bust of Lamar.
- The defunct Lamar University System named all of its member institutions after him; these included the flagship Lamar University in Beaumont, and the member institutions Lamar State College–Port Arthur, Lamar State College–Orange (both two-year community colleges), and Lamar Institute of Technology.
- High schools are named for Lamar in Houston, Arlington, and Rosenberg.
- Middle schools are named for Lamar in Temple, Austin, Dallas, Irving, Laredo, and Flower Mound.
- Elementary schools are named for Lamar in Amarillo, Corpus Christi, El Paso, San Antonio, Wichita Falls, and The Woodlands, as are numerous other K–12 schools throughout the state.
- During the Second World War, a Liberty ship was named for him SS Mirabeau B. Lamar.
- In 1959 he was inducted into the Georgia Newspaper Hall of Fame for his journalistic work.

== In popular culture ==
- Preston Jones's play The Oldest Living Graduate, part of his A Texas Trilogy, features a fictional Lamar Military Academy.
- S.C. Gwynne's history of the Comanche people, Empire of the Summer Moon, describes Lamar's directing the Comanche wars in vivid detail in chapter 6, "Blood and Smoke".

Political offices
Preceded by Lorenzo de Zavala ad interim	Vice President of the Republic of Texas; 1836–1838	Succeeded by David G. Burnet
Preceded by Sam Houston first term	President of the Republic of Texas; 1838–1842	Succeeded by Sam Houston second term
Diplomatic posts
Preceded by John H. Wheeler	United States Minister to Nicaragua; February 8, 1858–May 20, 1859	Succeeded by Alexander Dimitry
Vacant Title last held by Solon Borland	United States Minister to Costa Rica; September 14, 1858–May 20, 1859	Succeeded by Alexander Dimitry
