= Riall =

Riall is a given name and a surname. The surname may derive from Ryal in Northumberland, England. People with that name include:

- Lucy Riall (active from 2004), British historian
- Phineas Riall (1775-1850), British general
- Tom Riall (born 1960), British businessman
- Matthew Henry Phineas Riall Sankey (1853-1926), Irish-born engineer and captain in the Royal Engineers
- Riall Johnson (born 1978), American football player

== See also ==
- Ryall (disambiguation)
