= Jacksonville State University =

Public university in Jacksonville, Alabama, US

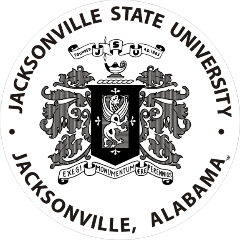
- Former names: Jacksonville State Normal School (1883–1930); Jacksonville State Teachers College (1930–1957); Jacksonville State College (1957–1966)
- Motto: The friendliest campus in the South.
- Type: Public university
- Established: 1883; 143 years ago
- Endowment: $57 million (2023)
- President: Don C. Killingsworth, Jr.
- Provost: Christie Shelton
- Faculty: 350 Full-time and 163 Part-time (Fall 2022)
- Students: 9,955 (Fall 2024)
- Undergraduates: 8,663 (Fall 2024)
- Postgraduates: 1,473 (Fall 2022)
- Location: Jacksonville, Alabama, United States; 33.822°N 85.766°W
- Campus: Suburban (small city)
- Colors: Red and White
- Nickname: Gamecocks
- Sporting affiliations: NCAA Division I FBS – CUSA
- Website: jsu.edu
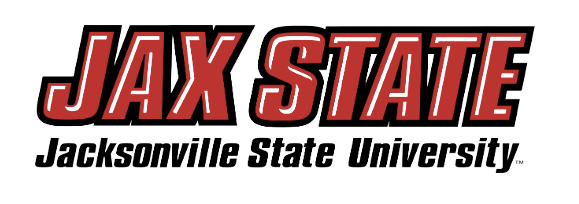

Jacksonville State University (JSU or Jax State) is a public university in Jacksonville, Alabama, United States. Founded in 1883, Jacksonville State offers programs of study in six academic schools leading to bachelor's, master's, education specialist, and doctorate degrees in addition to certificate programs and continuing education opportunities.

The university was founded as Jacksonville State Normal School, and in 1930, the name changed to Jacksonville State Teachers College, and again in 1957, to Jacksonville State College. The university began operating under its current name in 1966.

JSU has an enrollment of more than 9,000 students, with nearly 500 faculty members (more than 300 of whom are full-time). It is accredited by the Southern Association of Colleges and Schools (SACS).

== History ==
=== Jacksonville State Normal School ===
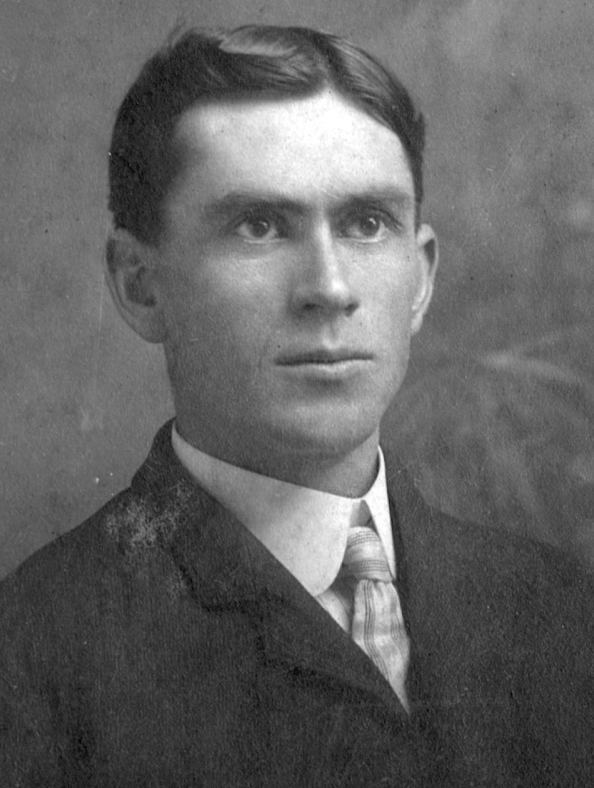
President James Gazaway Ryals, Jr., c. 1883

The university was founded as Jacksonville State Normal School, a "class A" normal school, it was chartered by the state of Alabama and Gov. Edward A. O'Neal on February 22, 1883, in order to prepare teachers for work in public school. It was established within campus of the former Calhoun College in Jacksonville. The first board of directors for the normal school included S. K. McSpadden, John M. Caldwell, James Crook, W. P. Howell, William M. Hames, D. A. Alderholt, H.L. Stevenson, W. J. Alexander, J. Y. Nisbet, L. W. Grant, and John D. Hammond, who served as the state superintendent of education.

The board of directors nominated James G. Ryals Jr. as the school's first president when it opened in the fall of 1883, and when Ryals died unexpectedly of pneumonia in 1885, faculty member Joseph Harris Chappell held the presidency for a year. Chappell departed for Milledgeville, Georgia where he served as the first president of a new normal school that eventually became Georgia College & State University. The first graduating class of Jacksonville State Normal School was in 1886. It was one of the first educational institutions in Alabama to have a library on campus.

=== Name changes ===
In 1930, the name changed to Jacksonville State Teachers College. In 1957, the school name changed once again, to Jacksonville State College after the creation of the first graduate program, a master's degree in elementary education. In August 1966, the Alabama State Board of Education elevated the college to university status, which prompted a school name change to Jacksonville State University.

=== 2018 tornado ===
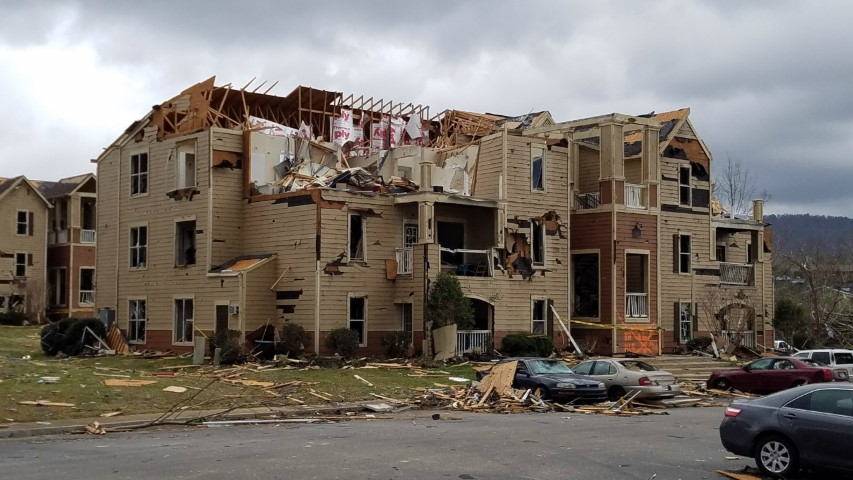
Apartments damaged from Jacksonville EF-3 Tornado on March 19, 2018

On the evening of March 19, 2018, an EF3 tornado struck the campus, causing minor to severe damage to every building. It was the first day of spring break for both the university and the Jacksonville City School System.

Classes resumed at the university on April 9, 2018, and the spring commencement ceremony was held on May 4, 2018, as scheduled, but moved to JSU Stadium from Pete Mathews Coliseum (which was also closed due to tornado damage). There were four injuries among city residents and no fatalities. More than $100 million in property damage was inflicted on the university and on April 27, 2018, President Donald Trump declared the event a federal disaster. The university continued its summer semester as planned, and President John Beehler stated all subsequent semesters will continue as normal.

== Presidents ==
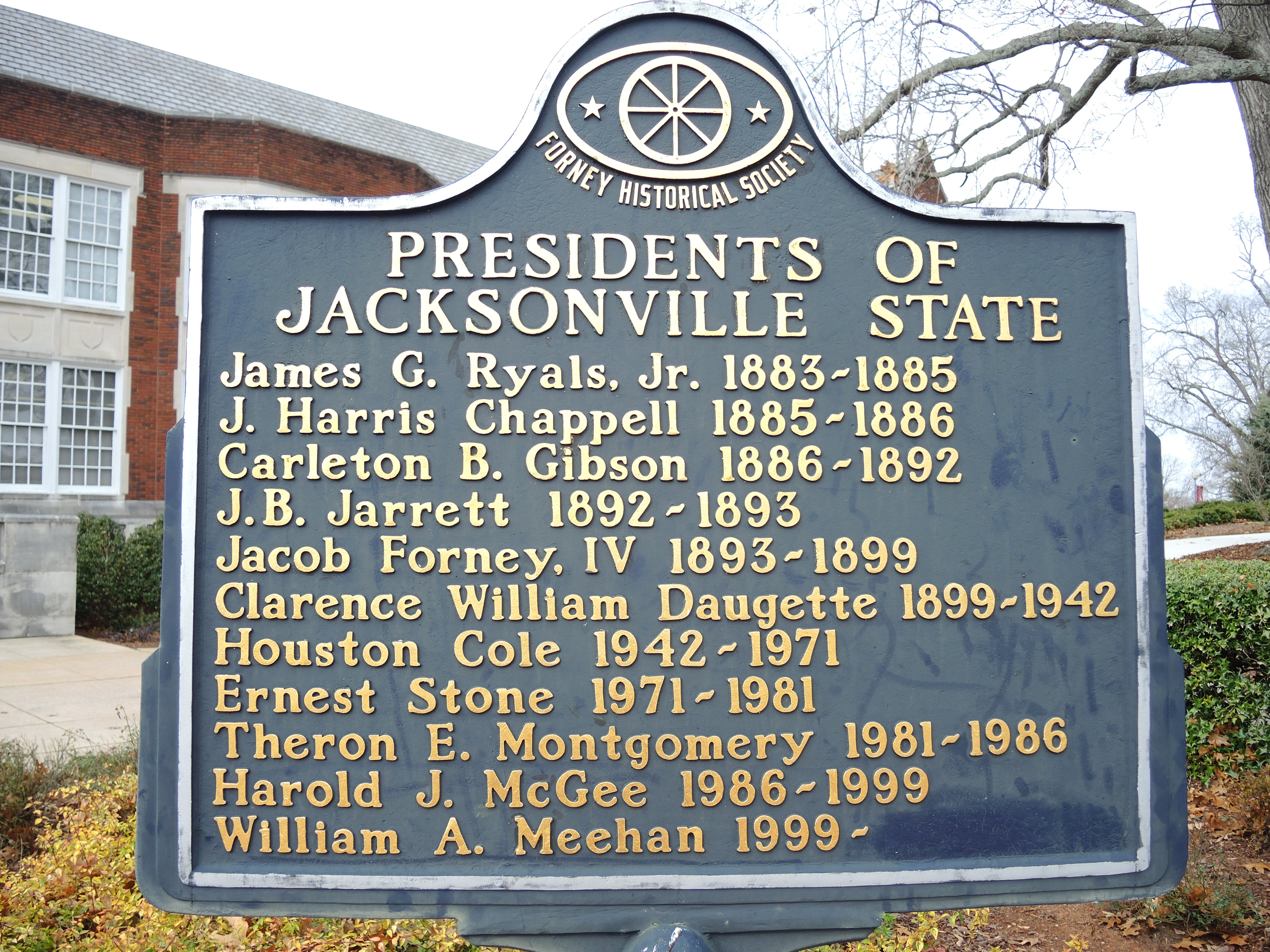
Presidents of Jacksonville State historical marker

- James G. Ryals Jr. (1883 to 1885)
- J. Harris Chappell (1885 to 1886)
- Carleton Bartlett Gibson (1886 to 1892)
- J.B. Jarrett (1892 to 1893)
- Jacob Forney IV (1893 to 1899)
- Clarence William Daugette (1899 to 1942)
- Houston Cole (1942 to 1971)
- Ernest Stone (1971 to 1981)
- Theron E. Montgomery (1981 to 1986)
- Harold J. McGee (1986 to 1999)
- William A. Meehan (1999 to 2015)
- John M. Beehler (2015 to 2019)
- Don C. Killingsworth, Jr. (2019 to present)

== Administration and organization ==
Since 2020, Jacksonville State is led by President Don Killlingsworth, and the Jacksonville State Board of Trustees. The Board of Trustees consists of 13 members, 12 of which are appointed by the Governor of Alabama and the Governor acting as president of the board. The board includes president Kay Ivey, chairman Randy Jones, vice chair Vivian Davis Figures, Tony Ingram serving as Out-of-State At-Large, Randy Owen serving as In-State At-Large, and Cheryl L. Bevelle-Orange serving as Out-of-State At-Large. The university president oversees the Presidential Cabinet, composed of the university's vice presidents and other senior personnel.

=== Academic organization ===
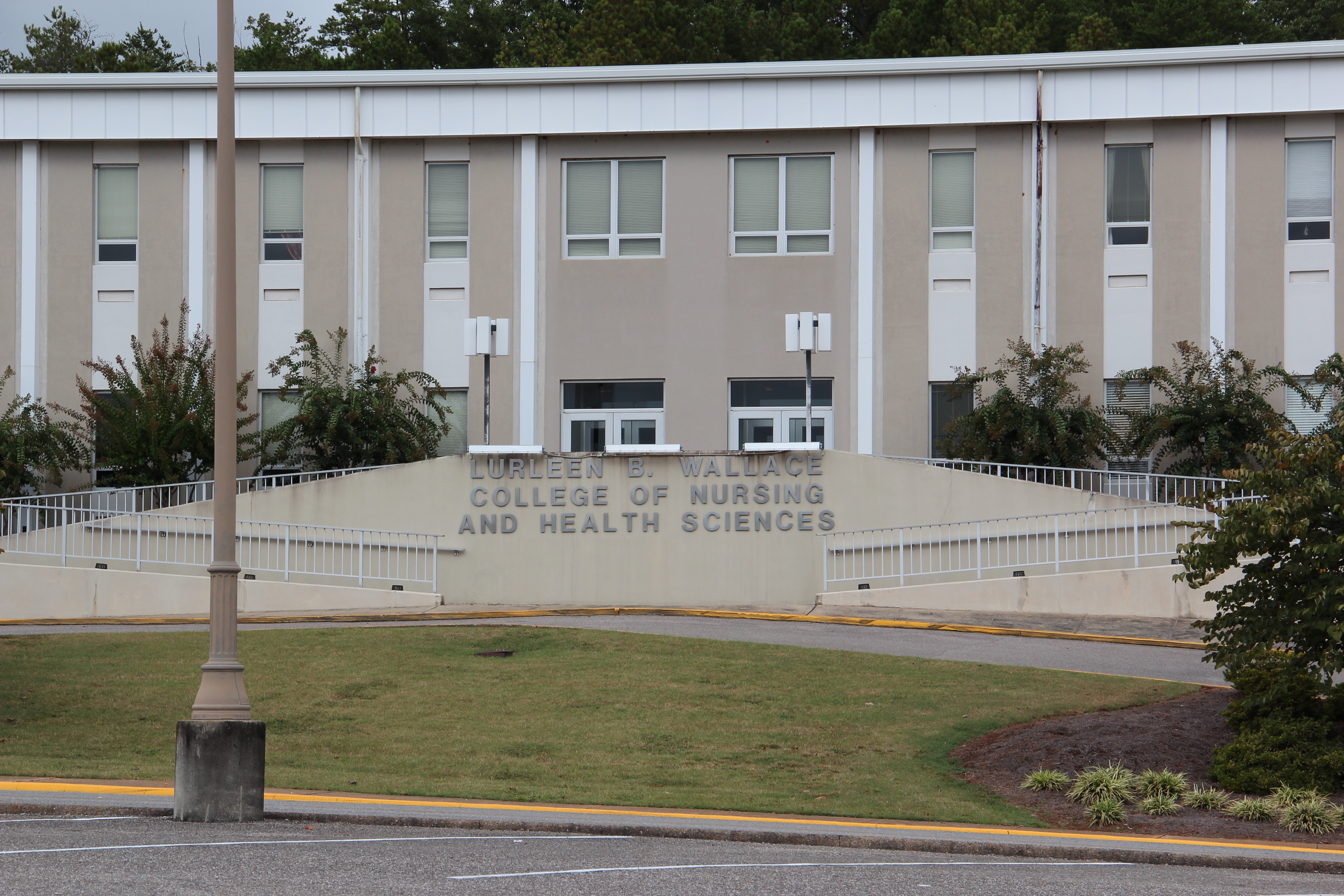
Wallace Hall, former home to the JSU nursing program

Through Jacksonville State's six academic colleges.

- College of Arts, Humanities, & Sciences
- College of Business and Industry
- College of Education and Professional Studies
- College of Health Professions and Wellness
- College of Social and Behavioral Sciences
- Library

== Main and satellite campuses ==
=== Main campus ===
The JSU main campus has a 459-acre (1.9 km^{2}) campus with 59 buildings in the Appalachian foothills of northeast Alabama. With this campus being the flagship campus for Jacksonville State, it offers large educational facilities, university housing and residence, on-campus dining, student centers, Greek housing, athletic facilities, student health and wellness facilities, administration offices, study centers, an international housing program, and an on-campus bookstore. The majority of students who study at Jacksonville State attend courses here.

=== Little River Canyon Center campus ===
The Little River Canyon Center campus opened to the public in 2009, and is a Jacksonville State University building located in Fort Payne, Alabama that adjoins the Little River Canyon National Preserve. A portion is leased to the National Park Service and the staff of the Little River Canyon National Preserve with a facility that features a Grand Hall, HD movie theater, gift shop, natural history library, exhibits, classrooms, back deck, outdoor amphitheater and trails for both education and adventure.

=== McClellan campus ===
The Jacksonville State University Higher Education Consortium was established in 2003, and it houses two state schools: Jacksonville State University–McClellan Center, and Gadsden State Community College–McClellan Campus. Since 2005, the McClellan Center Building 3181 has been home to the Institute of Emergency Preparedness, In-Service, and the Northeast Alabama Police Academy. GSCC houses the traditional college students. Their EMS and 911 programs, in addition to the core classes of English, math, etc., are also housed in the building.

== Enrollment ==
Undergraduate demographics as of Fall 2023
Race and ethnicity	Total
White	60%
Black	25%
Hispanic	5%
Two or more races	4%
International student	3%
Unknown	2%
Asian	1%
Economic diversity
Low-income (Note: The percentage of students who received an income-based federal Pell grant intended for low-income students.)	51%
Affluent (Note: The percentage of students who are a part of the American middle class at the bare minimum.)	49%

For the first time in the university history, the university enrolled more than 10,000 students in Fall 2025. The student body consists of 8,906 undergraduate students and 1,135 graduate students.

The student body is 40% male and 60% female. About 80% of students are below the age of 25. About 3,200 students are first generation students. The fall 2025 incoming class had a composite ACT score of 17-24 and a SAT score of 970–1260. The incoming class had a high school GPA of 3.4. The majority of students come from Alabama and northwest Georgia.

== Athletics ==
JSU athletics monogram

Jacksonville State's athletics teams are nicknamed the Gamecocks. The school fields varsity teams in 14 sports: baseball, men's and women's basketball, cross country, football, men's and women's golf, rifle, women's soccer, softball, men's and women's tennis, women's track and field, and volleyball. The football team plays in the 22,500-seat AmFirst Stadium. The men's and women's basketball and volleyball teams play in Pete Mathews Coliseum.

A member of Conference USA, Jacksonville State University sponsors teams in six men's, 10 women's, and one co-ed NCAA sanctioned sports:

== The Marching Southerners ==
Jacksonville State University's marching band, The Marching Southerners, was founded in 1956 by John Finley. He also conceived the band's precision dance line, The Marching Ballerinas. David L. Walters, for whom JSU's music department is named, served as band director from 1961 to 1991 and is credited with bringing the Marching Southerners to national prominence. The Marching Southerners feature the Marching Ballerinas and the famous 20J's, named for the C.G. Conn 20J tuba that the Southerners proudly feature in its halftime shows.

On January 1, 2012, the university's marching band and dance team, The Southerners and the Marching Ballerinas, led the New Year's Day Parade in London, England, which also kicked off the year-long celebration of both Her Majesty Queen Elizabeth II's Diamond Jubilee and the 2012 London Summer Olympics. The invitation to lead the parade came in September 2010, just as the Southerners learned that they had been awarded the nationally recognized George Washington Honor Medal for their patriotic 2009 show, "Of Thee I Sing." The Southerners were the 2021 recipients of the Sudler Trophy, the highest award for collegiate marching bands.

== Greek life ==
Over ten percent of the undergraduate student body is said to be involved in Greek life. There are 22 national recognized raternities and sororities. In 2013, 16 students were arrested in connection with allegations of hazing; news reports stated that Alpha Phi Alpha had been involved. In 2015, JSU's chapter of Sigma Phi Epsilon was closed down following another set of hazing allegations.

== Controversy ==
In February 2006, Jacksonville State University was named the "winner" of the Foundation for Individual Rights in Education (FIRE) Speech Code of the Month. At the time, FIRE called the University Code of Conduct "illegally overbroad." They considered the code to be in violation of the First Amendment of the Constitution which protects offensive speech. The policy has since been changed.
