= Thomas Jefferson Chappell =

American politician (1851–1910)

Personal details
- Born: November 29, 1851 Macon, Georgia, U.S.
- Died: May 8, 1910 (aged 58)
- Party: Democratic
- Parent: Absalom Harris Chappell (father)
- Relatives: Mirabeau B. Lamar (uncle); Joseph Harris Chappell (brother)
- Education: University of Georgia
- Occupation: Politician, lawyer, judge

Thomas Jefferson Chappell (November 29, 1851 – May 8, 1910) was an American lawyer, judge, and member of the Georgia House of Representatives for two terms. An Alumnus of the University of Georgia, he filled out an alumni questionnaire for the university's centennial publication.

He was born in Macon, Georgia, the third son of Absalom Harris Chappell and Loretto Rebecca Lamar. His mother was a sister of Mirabeau B. Lamar. His family moved to Columbus, Georgia, when he was a child.

He served as a Calendar Clerk for the Georgia House of Representatives before being elected a representative in 1884 from Muscogee County, Georgia. He was reelected in 1886. In 1900 he was elected to the Georgia State Senate. He compiled an Analytical Index and Digest of the Georgia Constitution of 1877. A Democrat, he was a delegate to the 1908 Democratic National Convention in Denver, Colorado.

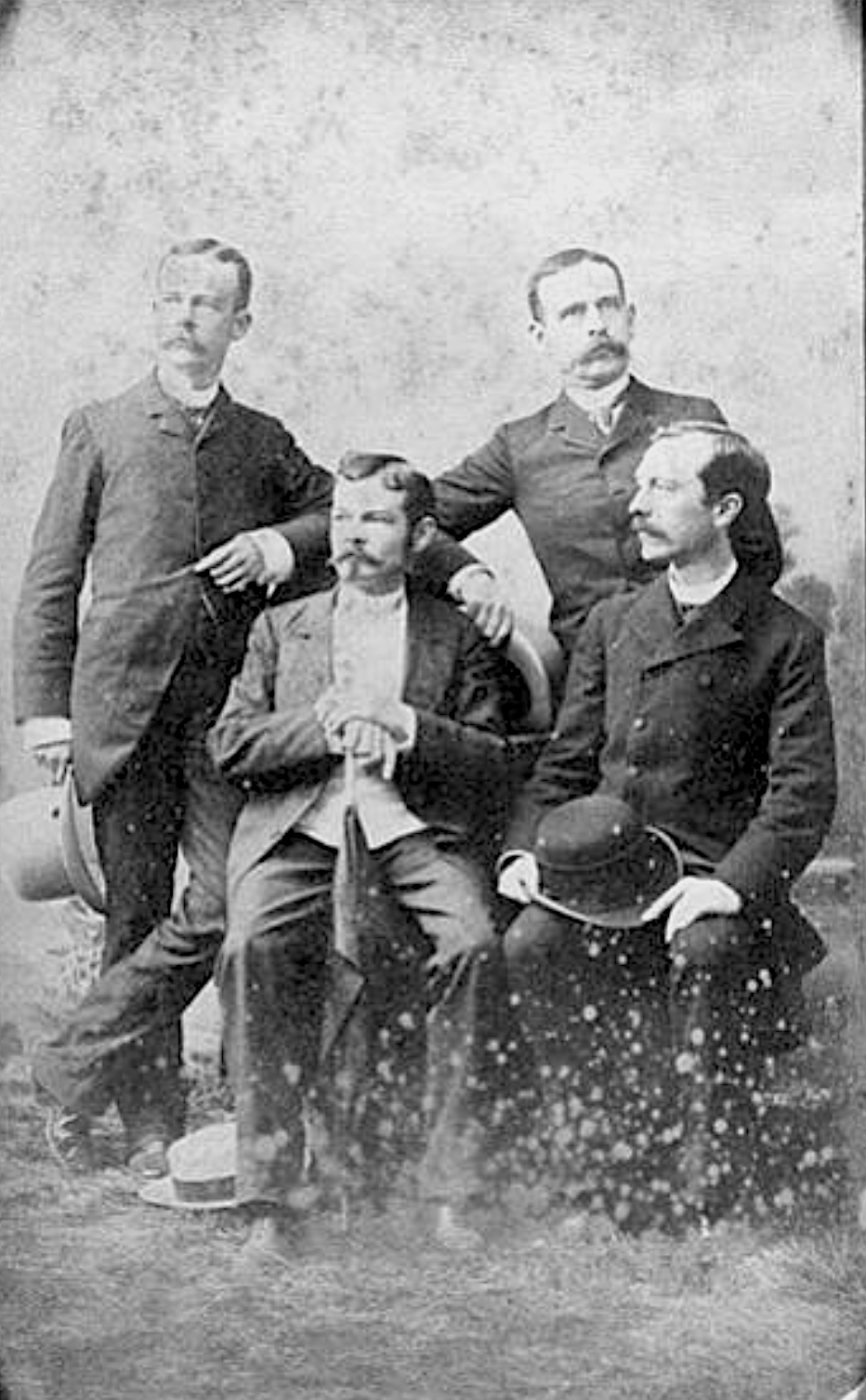
Photograph of the Chappell brothers (from left to right Lucius Henry Chappell, Thomas Jefferson Chappell, Lamar Chappell, and Joseph Harris Chappell)

His brother Lucius Henry Chappell served as mayor of Columbus and his brother Joseph Harris Chappell was a college president. He and his brothers were photographed.

== See also ==
- Chappell (surname)
