= James G. Ryals Jr. =

American university president (1855–1885)

James Gazaway Ryals, Jr.
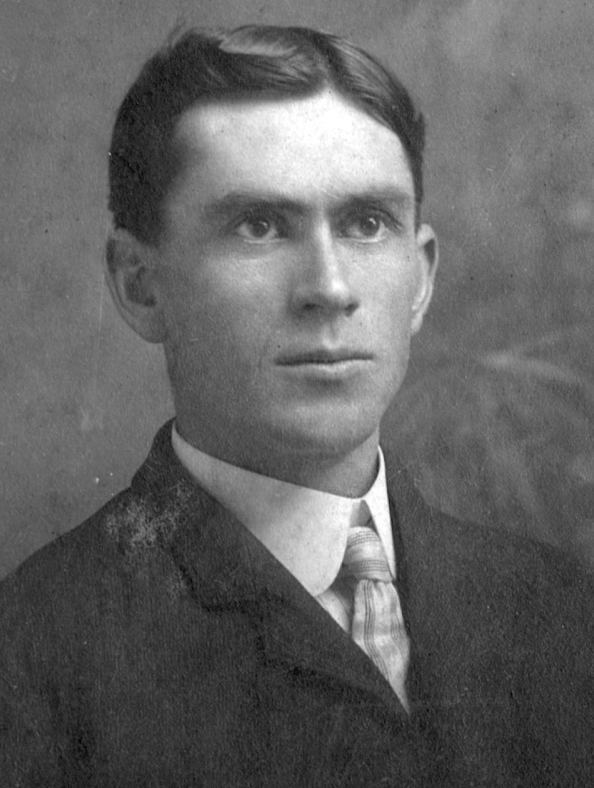

1st President of Jacksonville State University
- In office 1883 – April 18, 1885
- Succeeded by: J. Harris Chappell

Personal details
- Born: 1855 Bartow County, Georgia, U.S.
- Died: April 18, 1885 (aged 29–30) Jacksonville, Alabama, U.S.
- Education: Mercer University, University of Virginia
- Profession: University president

James Gazaway Ryals Jr. (1855–1885) was an American educator and university president. He served as the first president of the Jacksonville State Normal School (now Jacksonville State University) in Jacksonville, Alabama, from 1883 to 1885.

== Biography ==
James Gazaway Ryals Jr. was born in 1855 in Bartow County, Georgia. His parents were Mary Elizabeth Janes and Rev. James G. Ryals, a Baptist preacher who also ran a school for young men. His brother Thomas Edward Ryals was a lawyer and a member of the Georgia General Assembly.

He attended Mercer University in Macon, Georgia, and graduated with a two-year course (1877), where he was a member of Kappa Alpha Order; followed by study at the University of Virginia where he received a M.A. degree (1883).

The first session of the Jacksonville State Normal School was held in the brick building that was formerly used for the Calhoun Grange College (or Calhoun College) and it had an enrollment of 246 pupils. He died on April 18, 1885, in Jacksonville, Alabama, from pneumonia, while he was serving as the school president and was succeeded by J. Harris Chappell.
