= Royal Russell Long =

American criminal (1935–1993)

- Born: May 15, 1935; Brazil, Indiana, United States
- Died: November 3, 1993 (aged 58); Rawlins, Wyoming, United States
- Occupations: Truck driver; Fairground worker
- Status: Deceased
- Criminal charge: Two counts of kidnapping
- Penalty: Two life terms in prison

Details
- Victims: 2–8+
- Span of crimes: 1974–1984
- Country: United States
- State: Various
- Date apprehended: September 26, 1984

Royal Russell Long (May 15, 1935 – November 3, 1993) was an American convicted kidnapper and suspected serial killer and serial rapist who was given two life sentences for abducting two girls. Long is also a possible suspect in the disappearances and murders of a number of young women and girls in Wyoming and Oklahoma, along with several other cases throughout Colorado and Missouri.

== Early life and criminal history ==
Long was born on May 15, 1935, in Brazil, Indiana. In 1974, Long moved to the Rawlins, Wyoming, region, where he worked as a carny and part-time long-haul truck driver at local fairs and carnivals beginning in 1981. Long was apprehended on September 26, 1984, in Albuquerque, New Mexico, regarding the kidnapping of hitchhiker Sharon Baldeagle, 12, in Eagle Butte, South Dakota, on September 19, 1984, and her friend. Baldeagle was not with him when he was arrested. Long pleaded guilty to two counts of kidnapping for the purpose of committing indecent liberties with a minor and was sentenced to two life terms in prison. He died of a heart attack in 1993 at the Wyoming State Penitentiary and was never convicted in connection with any missing people besides Baldeagle.

=== Rawlins rodeo murders ===
- On July 4, 1974, 19-year-old Carlene Brown was last seen in Rawlins, Wyoming. On that day, she went to the fairgrounds to see the Little Britches Rodeo with her friend Christine Ann "Christy" Gross, also 19. After that, both of them vanished, and their car was later discovered abandoned between the fairgrounds and the town of Worland, Wyoming, located more than 200 miles to the north. In October 1983, nine years after she had vanished, Christy's remains were discovered three miles south of Sinclair, Wyoming. She had died from two significant blows to the head. Carlene was not there at the site and has not been seen or heard from since.
- On August 4, 1974, Deborah Rae Meyer, then 14 years old, was last seen leaving a relative's home in the area of Seventh and Spruce Streets in Rawlins, Wyoming. She had intended to walk to a nearby movie theater, but she never made it. Deborah is believed to have been kidnapped and killed because she has never been found.
- On August 23, 1974, 10-year-old Jayleen Dawn Banker became separated from her friends while watching the Carbon County rodeo at the Rawlins fairgrounds, and she instantly vanished. On April 24, 1975, eight months after going missing, Jayleen's partially dressed body was discovered in a field. Her death was determined to be a homicide; she had died from a blow to the head. She was identified through dental charts and a ring found with her bones.

=== Additional cases ===
After his conviction, Long was tied by authorities to several disappearances and deaths in the Wyoming and Oklahoma areas during the 1970s and 1980s, some of which involved carnivals or similar events. Long had a history of sexual violence towards young women and Long's own daughter claimed that he had molested her for years and witnessed him try to lure other girls with puppies or stuffed animals. Stuffed animals were found in his car when he was arrested in New Mexico.

- Cinda Leann Pallett, 13, was last seen with Charlotte June Kinsey, another 13-year-old friend, on September 26, 1981, at the Oklahoma State Fairgrounds in Oklahoma City, Oklahoma. Kinsey called her family's home to tell them that she and Pallett had received jobs unloading stuffed animals for the carnival with a male worker. The man they were seen with claimed to be a carnival worker and had approached numerous other visitors at the fair that day. In August 1985, Long was charged with kidnapping and killing Charlotte and Cinda after he confirmed to investigators that he was at the Oklahoma State Fair on the day the girls were kidnapped and was recognized by several eyewitnesses as the man who had approached other children with the same job offer of unloading toys. Using forensic testing, hairs discovered in the trunk of Long's car were examined and identified as belonging to Cinda. Investigators believe that a lock of blonde hair they discovered at Long's Wyoming home may have been Charlotte's. However, the charges against Long were dropped in December 1985 after the presiding judge disregarded the testimony of Long's daughter and a large portion of the physical evidence. Neither girl has been found, and Long is the main suspect in the girls' disappearances.
- Carolyn Celeste Eaton, 17, previously known as Valentine Sally, was a girl found murdered on February 14, 1982, west of Williams, Arizona. Her cause of death is believed to be asphyxia, and she was last seen alive at the Monte Carlo Truck Stop in Ash Fork, Arizona, during the early morning hours of February 3, 1982, on Interstate 40. It is suspected by law enforcement that Long was responsible, considering he had no documented kidnappings during this time frame and bore a strong resemblance to the description of an unidentified man last seen with Eaton. Long is also believed to have traveled through Interstate 40 after he murdered Pallet and Kinsey in September 1981. On February 14, an Arizona Department of Public Safety officer discovered Eaton's body westbound close to Interstate 40, 11 miles west of Williams, Arizona, while searching for a flat tire following a car accident. Eaton's body was positively identified on February 22, 2021; she had run away from home in Bellefontaine Neighbors, Missouri, on December 25, 1981, and is thought to have hitched a ride to Arizona.
- 12-year-old Sharon Baldeagle ran away from her hometown of Eagle Butte, South Dakota, on September 18, 1984, along with a 15-year-old friend named Sandi Brokenleg. The pair were picked up by Long, who drove to his residence in Evansville, Wyoming, and held the girls at gunpoint before subjecting them to severe physical and sexual abuse. Brokenleg managed to escape, and when authorities arrived at Long's home, neither he nor Sharon was found. One week later, Long was apprehended in Albuquerque, New Mexico. He claimed he left Sharon in Cheyenne, Wyoming, and said he was unaware if she was alive or not. Long was given two life sentences after entering a guilty plea to two counts of kidnapping with the intent to engage in indecent acts with a juvenile. Baldeagle has never been found.
- 15-year-olds Yvonne Mestas and her friend Victoria Sanchez both disappeared on November 1, 1982, from Rocky Ford, Colorado. The two high school freshmen left Rocky Ford High School during the school day for unknown reasons. After leaving the school the girls were never heard from again. Long is considered a suspect in their disappearance.
