= John B. Lamar =

American politician

John Basil Lamar

Member of the U.S. House of Representatives from Georgia's at-large district
- In office March 4, 1843 – July 29, 1843
- Preceded by: Thomas Butler King
- Succeeded by: Absalom Harris Chappell

Member of the Georgia House of Representatives
- In office 1837-1838

Personal details
- Born: November 5, 1812 Milledgeville, Georgia
- Died: September 15, 1862 (aged 49) Crampton's Gap, Maryland
- Resting place: Rose Hill Cemetery, Macon, Georgia
- Party: Democrat Confederate States of America
- Education: Franklin College
- Occupation: Farmer

Military service
- Allegiance: Confederate States of America
- Branch/service: Confederate States Army
- Rank: Colonel
- Battles/wars: American Civil War: Battle of Crampton's Gap

John Basil Lamar (November 5, 1812 – September 15, 1862) was an American politician, lawyer, and planter.

== Biography ==
Lamar was born in Milledgeville, Georgia. He attended the Franklin College, which later became the University of Georgia (UGA) in Athens, beginning in 1827 but did not graduate. In 1830, he moved to a plantation near Macon, Georgia, and became a successful planter. He owned holdings in fourteen Georgia counties and in Florida. In 1837 and 1838, Lamar served in the Georgia House of Representatives. He was elected in 1842 to represent Georgia in the United States House of Representatives during the 28th Congress; however, his service was brief as he resigned and left office on July 29, 1843, after taking office only months before on March 4, 1843.

After his resignation in 1843, Lamar returned to his agricultural pursuits. In 1851, some of his literary work was published in Polly Peablossom's Wedding (1851), edited by T. A. Burke. He has and had a significant reputation for his humorous writings, and was a founder and practitioner of both the school of Realism in America and genre of Southern Humor. From 1855 to 1858, he served on the UGA board of trustees and served at the state convention which passed the Ordinance of Secession in 1861.

During the American Civil War, Lamar served as an aide to Confederate States Army General Howell Cobb, the husband of his sister, Mary Ann Lamar Cobb, and close friend. He was wounded during Battle of Crampton's Gap Maryland trying to rally Cobb's Brigade. He died within a day on September 15, 1862. After temporary burial in Charles Town, Virginia, he was later reinterred in Macon's Rose Hill Cemetery.

The Lamar Mounds and Village Site is located on the former plantation of John Basil Lamar which led to the use of the name Lamar in reference to the mounds and was adopted by the founders of the Lamar Institute, a group active in archaeology in the American south.

== See also ==
- List of signers of the Georgia Ordinance of Secession
- Confederate States of America, causes of secession, "Died of states' rights"
- United States Congress. "John B. Lamar (id: L000029)". Biographical Directory of the United States Congress. Retrieved on 2009-04-30
- History of the University of Georgia, Thomas Walter Reed, Imprint: Athens, Georgia : University of Georgia, ca. 1949 p.309

U.S. House of Representatives
Preceded by Thomas Butler King	Member of the U.S. House of Representatives from Georgia's at-large congressional district March 4, 1843 – July 29, 1843.	Succeeded by Absalom Harris Chappell
