= David Royle =

David Royle may refer to:

- David Royle (actor), an actor who portrayed Edgar 'Wieldy' Wield in the Dalziel and Pascoe television series
- David Royle, a Labour councillor for Fallowfield
