= Ryal, Northumberland =

Coordinates: 55.062797°N 1.9774088°W

Ryal
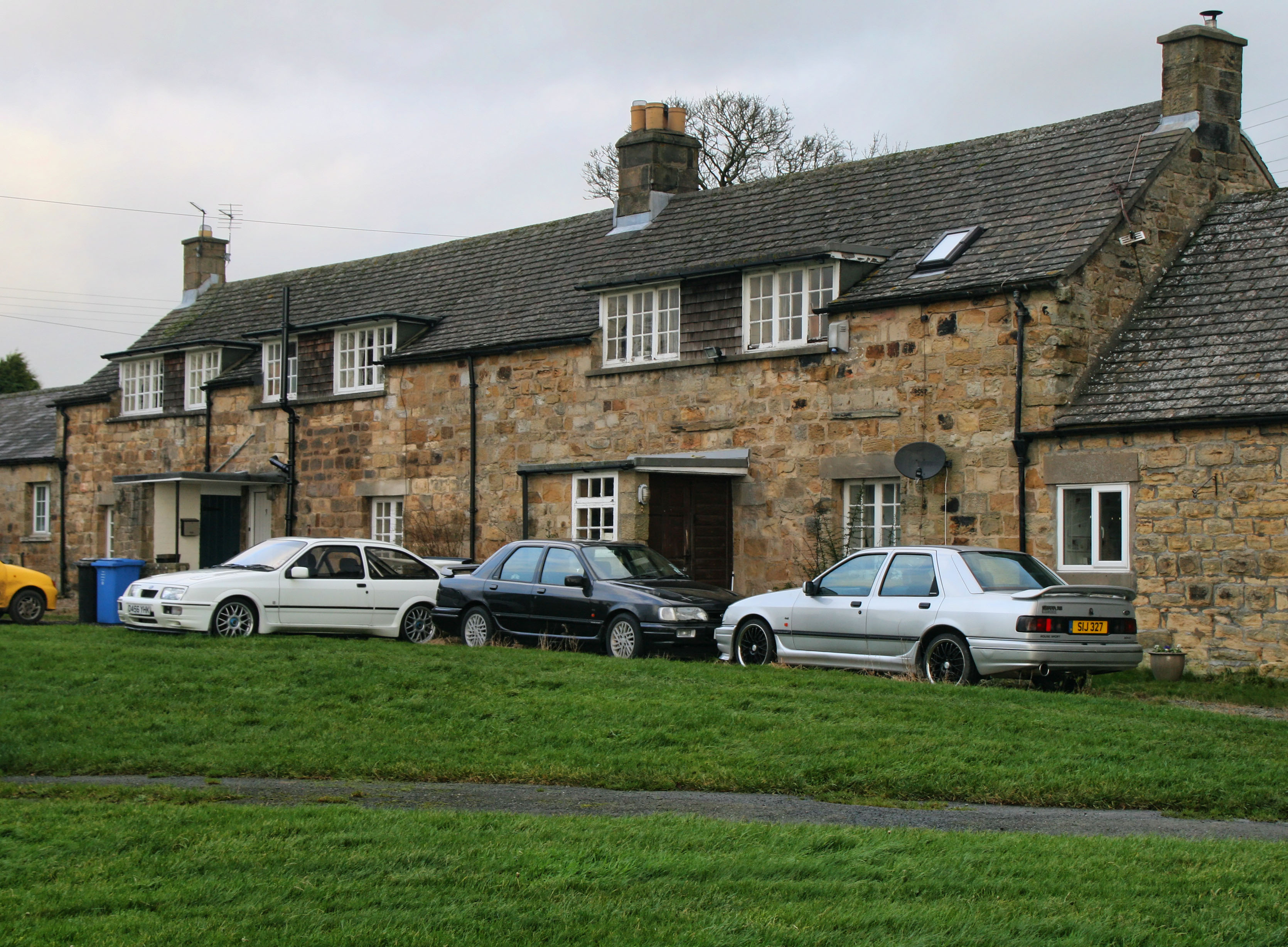

- Location within Northumberland
- Civil parish: Matfen
- Unitary authority: Northumberland
- Shire county: Northumberland
- Region: North East
- Country: England
- Sovereign state: United Kingdom
- Police: Northumbria
- Fire: Northumberland
- Ambulance: North East

Ryal or Ryall is a village and former civil parish about 13 miles from Hexham, now in the parish of Matfen, in the county of Northumberland, England. In 1951 the parish had a population of 41. The village now has 2 farms, 6 cottages and a church called All Saints' Church.

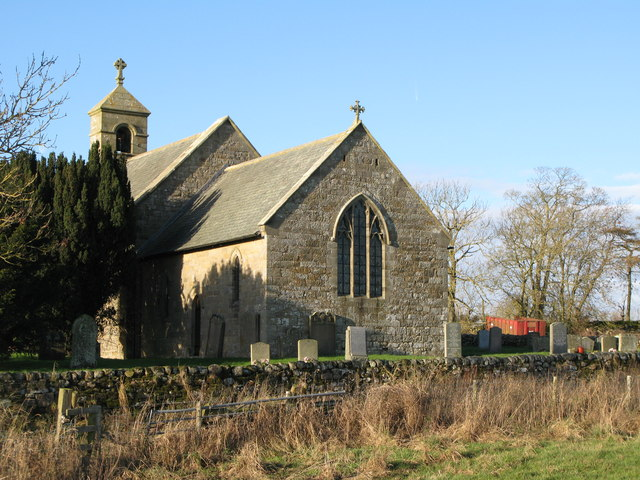
All Saints' Church

== History ==
The name "Ryal" means 'Rye hill'. Ryal was recorded as "Ryhill" in 1242 and "Ryel" in 1256. The village is one of the possible sources of the surnames Ryal, Ryall, Rahill, Rayhill, Reihill, Riall, Royl, Royal, Royall, Royle, Ryle, Ryles and Rymill. Ryall was formerly a township in Stamfordham parish, from 1866 Ryal was a civil parish in its own right until it was abolished on 1 April 1955 to form Matfen.
