= Lucius Quintus Cincinnatus Lamar I =

American judge

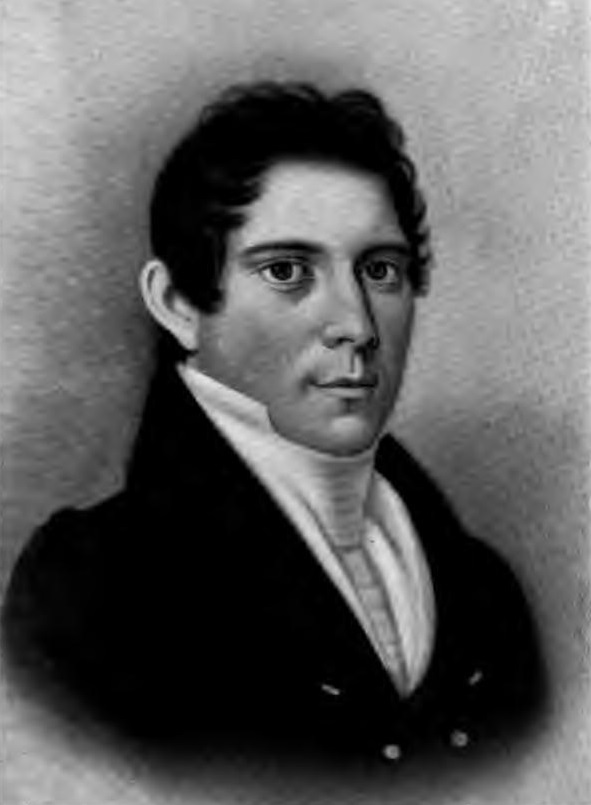
Lucius Q. C. Lamar (1797–1834), Georgia lawyer and judge.

Lucius Quintus Cincinnatus Lamar (July 15, 1797 – July 4, 1834) was an American attorney and jurist in his native Georgia. His son Lucius Quintus Cincinnatus Lamar II followed him into law and was appointed from Mississippi as a U.S. Supreme Court Justice.

== Early life and education ==
Lucius was the first son in his family, and born on his father's plantation in Milledgeville, Georgia, where he grew up. His parents, John and Rebecca (Lamar) Lamar had allowed his mother's brother to name their sons; he named them after his favorite historical heroes. Lamar was named for the Roman statesman Lucius Quinctius Cincinnatus. His younger brother was Mirabeau Buonaparte Lamar, who became known for fighting for the independence of the Republic of Texas and was elected as its second president. His parents were first cousins. Their family was well-connected in Georgia and the South; first cousins Gazaway Bugg Lamar and his brother G. W. became bankers in Augusta, Savannah, and New York City.

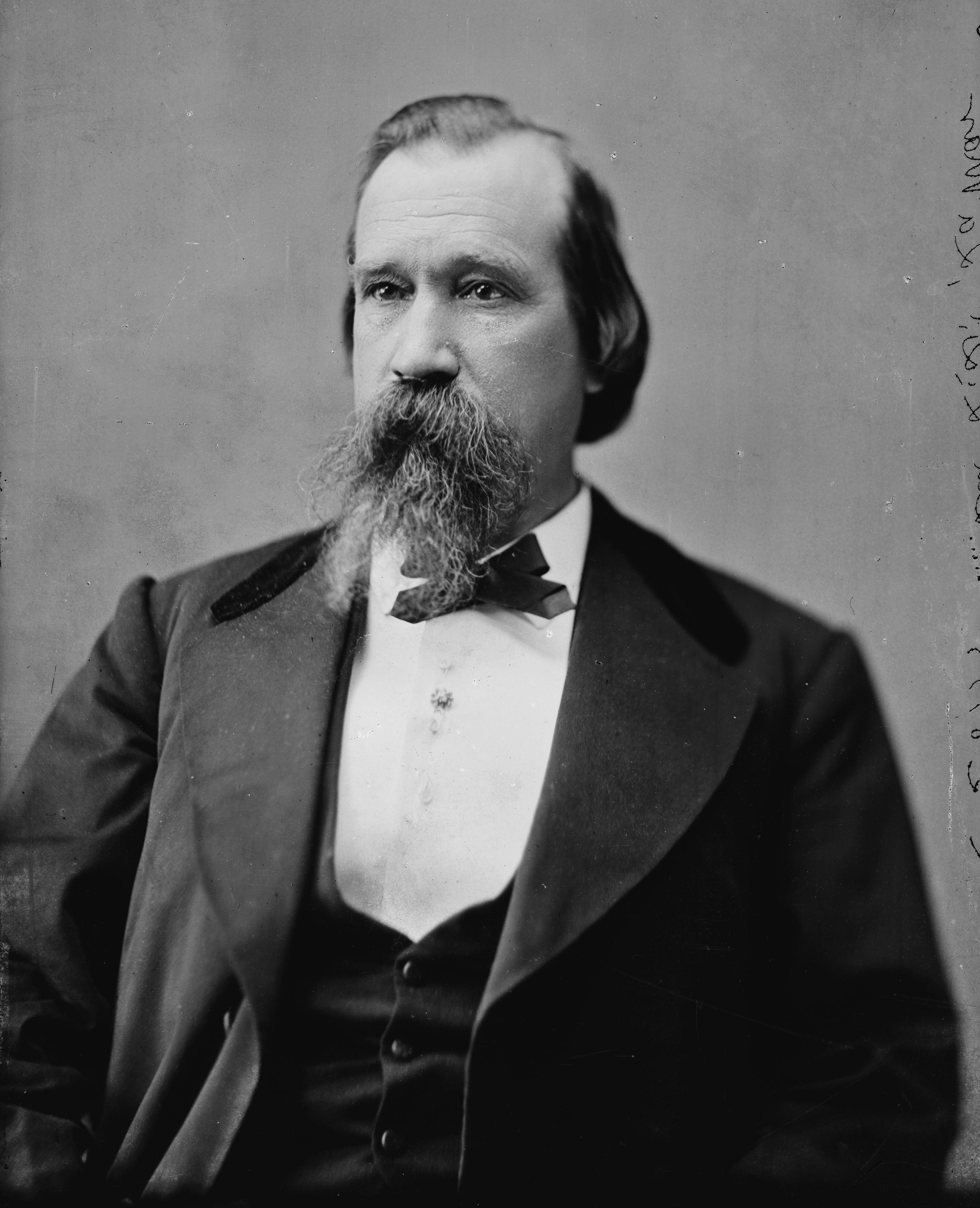
L. Q. C. Lamar II

Lucius Lamar studied law at Milledgeville, Georgia, and at Litchfield Law School in Litchfield, Connecticut. He was admitted to the Georgia bar in 1819. He set up his practice in his hometown of Milledgeville. After getting established, he married and started a family.

== Law career ==
Lamar revised Augustin Smith Clayton's Georgia Justice about 1819. He was commissioned by the legislature to compile The Laws of Georgia from 1810 to 1819 (Augusta, 1821).

He gained respect as an attorney. In 1830, Lamar was elected as judge of the Superior Court, succeeding Thomas W. Cobb.

In 1834, he committed suicide by gunshot. He was said to have been despondent after learning that a man he had convicted of murder and sentenced to death was in fact innocent of the crime. But this account has been questioned. He was buried at Memory Hill Cemetery in Milledgeville.
