= List of ship launches in 1840 =

The list of ship launches in 1840 includes a chronological list of some ships launched in 1840.

Date	Ship	Class	Builder	Location	Country	Notes
4 January	Hindostan	Merchantman	John Scott & Sons	Greenock	United Kingdom	For John Scott & Sons.
7 January	Lizard	Lizard-class gunvessel		Woolwich Dockyard	United Kingdom	For Royal Navy.
7 January	Robert Edward Ward	Merchantman		Kirkcubbin	United Kingdom	For private owner.
11 January	Prince Albert	Full-rigged ship	Messrs. Hilhouse	Bristol	United Kingdom	For private owner.
14 January	John Garrow	Merchantman	John Ronalds & Co	Aberdeen	United Kingdom	For Messrs. Anderson, Garrow & Co.
20 January	Warrington	Paddle tug	Bridge Foundry Company	Warrington	United Kingdom	For private owner.
21 January	Success	Dredger	S. Speakman	Fleetwood	United Kingdom	For Wyre Harbour Company.
22 January	Jacob Bell	Pilot boat	Brown & Bell	New York	United States	For William H. Rolston.
22 January	Quintin Leitch	Merchantman	Messrs. Muries & Clark	Greenock	United Kingdom	For private owner.
23 January	Livingstone	Barque	Messrs. Joseph Steel & Son	Liverpool	United Kingdom	For private owner.
January	Achilles	Snow	T. & N. Davie	Sunderland	United Kingdom	For Mr. Weatherly.
January	Bithon	Snow	W. Sutherland	Sunderland	United Kingdom	For B. Denton.
January	Camilla	Merchantman	W. Chilton	Sunderland	United Kingdom	For Foster & Co.
January	Mazeppa	Merchantman	H. Dixon	Sunderland	United Kingdom	For J. Webster.
January	Royal Albert	Barque	Reed, Denton & Co	Sunderland	United Kingdom	For Mr. Briggs.
January	Veronica	Merchantman	Cuthbert Potts	Sunderland	United Kingdom	For Mr. Walker.
5 February	Britannia	Britannia-class steamship	Robert Duncan & Company	Greenock	United Kingdom	For British and North American Royal Mail Steam Packet Company.
6 February	The Queen	Schooner	Messrs. Henry Smith & Son	Gainsborough	United Kingdom	For private owner
7 February	Joseph N. Lord	Pilot boat	Jabez Williams	New York	United States	For New York Pilots.
19 February	Hindoo	Merchantman		Caernarfon	United Kingdom	For Humphrey Owen.
19 February	Queen	Steamship	Messrs. Carmichael	Dundee	United Kingdom	For private owner.
20 February	Waren Packet	Schooner	Joseph Wilkinson	Newcastle upon Tyne	United Kingdom	For Messrs. Henry and Philip Nairn.
25 February	George	Brig	Messrs. Petty and Postlethwaite	Ulverstone	United Kingdom	For private owner.
February	Alyth	Merchantman	John M. Gales	Sunderland	United Kingdom	For Panton & Sons.
February	Beaver	Merchantman	J. Carr	Sunderland	United Kingdom	For Mr. Fairlamb.
February	Wansbeck	Merchantman	Lightfoot	Sunderland	United Kingdom	For Carr & Co.
7 March	The Devon	full-rigged ship	Messrs. Thomas Royden & Co.	Liverpool	United Kingdom	For T. Tapley.
7 March	United States	Steamship	Messrs. Thomas Wilson and Co	Liverpool	United Kingdom	For Transatlantic Steam Navigation Company.
13 March	Glenesk	Schooner	G. Dickie	Montrose	United Kingdom	For private owner.
18 March	Medina	Merlin-class packet boat		Pembroke Dockyard	United Kingdom	For Royal Navy.
19 March	Helen and Jean	Schooner	Smith	Arbroath	United Kingdom	For private owner.
19 March	Jessie Greig	Brig	Stephens	Arbroath	United Kingdom	For Andrew Greig.
19 March	Martha Ridgway	Full-rigged ship	Messrs. Humble & Milcrest	Liverpool	United Kingdom	For Messrs. John Ridgway & Co.
19 March	Mary Nixon	Barque	T. Gales	Sunderland	United Kingdom	For J. Nixon.
19 March	Robert Ingham	Merchantman	Messrs. Metcalfe & Son	South Shields	United Kingdom	For private owner.
19 March	St. Vincent	Brig	Messrs. Chaloner, Sons & Co.	Liverpool	United Kingdom	For John Cropper.
21 March	Jane	Schooner	Oliver Chapman	Chepstow	United Kingdom	For Mr. M'Arthur and others.
27 March	Marchioness of Abercorn	Packet ship		Londonderry	United Kingdom	For private owner.
March	Atlantic	Barque		Perth	United Kingdom	For Messrs. Hepburn.
March	Emanuel Boucher	Brig	John Westacott	Barnstaple	United Kingdom	For private owner.
March	Employ	Merchantman	W. Naizby & Bulmer	Sunderland	United Kingdom	For Mr. Graydon.
March	George and Elizabeth	Full-rigged ship	James Robinson	Sunderland	United Kingdom	For George Sheville.
March	Ione	Snow	J. H. Robson	Sunderland	United Kingdom	For Mr. Thompson.
March	Princess	Merchantman	H. Carr	Sunderland	United Kingdom	For Panton & Co.
March	Unity	Snow		Sunderland	United Kingdom	For Mr. Bedlington.
1 April	Emerys	Merchantman	Potts	South Shields	United Kingdom	For private owner.
2 April	Bucephalus	Barque	Smtih	Newcastle upon Tyne	United Kingdom	For private owner.
2 April	Raymond	Barque	Peter Austin & Son	Sunderland	United Kingdom	For Ward & Co.
3 April	Ocean	Brigantine	Messrs. Brown & Sons	Montrose	United Kingdom	For private owner.
4 April	Charlotte	Full-rigged ship	Messrs. Humphrey & Co.	Hull	United Kingdom	For Messrs. C. Eggington & Sons.
4 April	Friedland	Océan-class ship of the line	Jean Michel Segondat	Cherbourg	France	For French Navy.
6 April	Cygnet	Alert-class brig-sloop		Woolwich Dockyard	United Kingdom	For Royal Navy.
7 April	Mayborough	Brig	Austin & Mills	Sunderland	United Kingdom	For Gateshead & Tyne Shipping Co.
11 April	Ann and Catherine	Schooner	Humphrey Griffith	Pwllheli	United Kingdom	For private owner.
13 April	Commercial	Barque	George Frater	Sunderland	United Kingdom	For Hartlepool Commercial Shipping Company.
15 April	Devonshire Lass	Schooner	Geen	Appledore	United Kingdom	For private owner.
16 April	Seadrift	Brig	Messrs. J. & W. Campion	Whitby	United Kingdom	For Messrs. Addison & Campion.
18 April	Alpha	Schooner	Farnie	Burntisland	United Kingdom	For private owners.
18 April	Bittern	Acorn-class brig-sloop		Portsmouth Dockyard	United Kingdom	For Royal Navy.
18 April	Locust	Lizard-class gunvessel		Woolwich Dockyard	United Kingdom	For Royal Navy.
18 April	Prince Albert	Merchantman	Winlo	Howden	United Kingdom	For Port of Newcastle General Shipping Company
18 April	Victory	Schooner	Humphrey Griffith	Pwllheli	United Kingdom	For private owner.
20 April	Peru	Steamship	Curlings & Young	Limehouse	United Kingdom	For Pacific Steam Navigation Company.
25 April	Galveston	Brig	Schott & Whitney	Baltimore, Maryland	United States	For Texan Navy.
30 April	Thetis	Frigate		Holmen	Denmark	For Royal Danish Navy.
April	Agnes	Snow	J. Crown	Sunderland	United Kingdom	For Mr. Henderson.
April	Prince Albert	Snow	Kirkbride & partners	Sunderland	United Kingdom	For Fryer Glendenning.
April	Swallow	Merchantman	W. Doxford	Sunderland	United Kingdom	For John Thompson.
1 May	Dolphin	Schooner	Kirkbride & Carruthers	Sunderland	United Kingdom	For Ord & Co.
1 May	Eliza Wylie	Barque	Innes	Leith	United Kingdom	For private owner.
1 May	Johns	Snow	G. Moore	Sunderland	United Kingdom	For Elliot & Co.
2 May	George	West Indiaman	Thomas Evans	Bideford	United Kingdom	For Messrs. Evan Baillie, Sons & Co.
2 May	Iron Duke	Full-rigged ship	Tod and MacGregor	Glasgow	United Kingdom	For private owner.
3 May	Quarry Maid	Schooner	William Jones	Alltfawr	United Kingdom	For private owner.
4 May	Cynosure	Schooner	William Bonker	Salcombe	United Kingdom	For Henry Grant and others.
5 May	Maeander	Seringapatam-class frigate	Robert Seppings	Chatham Dockyard	United Kingdom	For Royal Navy.
16 May	Brigand	Steamship	Messrs. Grantham, Page & Co.	Liverpool	United Kingdom	For E. Redmond.
18 May	Union	Brig	W. Gibson	Hull	United Kingdom	For Hull Shipping Company.
22 May	Christian VIII	Second rate	Andreas Schifter	Nyholm	Denmark	For Royal Danish Navy.
29 May	Meanwell	Snow	W. Thompson & Pearson	Sunderland	United Kingdom	For J. Donkin.
30 May	Dover	Steamship	John Laird	North Birkenhead	United Kingdom	For Royal Navy.
30 May	Phlegethon	Steamship	John Laird	North Birkenhead	United Kingdom	For private owner.
May	Amphitrite	Merchantman	Reed & Banfield	Sunderland	United Kingdom	For Mr. Headley.
May	Auricula	Barque	Reed & Banfield	Sunderland	United Kingdom	For David Francis.
May	Corea	Full-rigged ship		Quebec	(United Kingdom of Great Britain and Ireland) Upper Canada	For private owner.
May	Glide	Snow	Austin & Mills	Sunderland	United Kingdom	For Mr. Doxford.
May	Lady Mary	Merchantman	Bartram & Mills	Biddick Ford	United Kingdom	For Mr. Kirkcaldy.
May	Macao	Full-rigged ship		Quebec	(United Kingdom of Great Britain and Ireland) Upper Canada	For private owner.
1 June	Ferret	Brig		Portsmouth Dockyard	United Kingdom	For Royal Navy.
2 June	Anne Metcalfe	East Indiaman	Messrs. Metcalfe & Sons	Jarrow	United Kingdom	For private owner.
2 June	Sea Nymph	Schooner	Messrs. Thomson and Kirwan	Belfast	United Kingdom	For Messrs. Casement & McClean.
2 June	The Cockburn	West Indiaman	Messrs. Menzies & Sons	Leith	United Kingdom	For Walter Cockburn.
3 June	Rapid	Pandora-class brig-sloop		Portsmouth Dockyard	United Kingdom	For Royal Navy.
17 June	Mary and Jane	Schooner	John Prichard	Pwllehli	United Kingdom	For private owner.
27 June	Edwen	Schooner			United Kingdom	For private owner.
29 June	Lady Raffles	Barque	John M. Gales	Sunderland	United Kingdom	For Mr. Osbourne.
June	Hannah Kerr	Full-rigged ship		Saint John	(United Kingdom of Great Britain and Ireland) Colony of New Brunswick	For private owner.
June	John	Brig			Unknown	For private owner.
June	Shannon	schooner			Unknown	For private owner.
June	Springfield	Barque		Saint John	(United Kingdom of Great Britain and Ireland) Colony of New Brunswick	For private owner.
1 July	Baronet	Brig	Adamson	Grangemouth	United Kingdom	For Mr. Wylie.
10 July	Selafail	Sultan Makhmud-class ship of the line	V. Apostoli	Nicholaieff	Russia	For Imperial Russian Navy.
14 July	Iris	Spartan-class frigate		Devonport Dockyard	United Kingdom	For Royal Navy.
23 July	Queen	Steamship		Chippewa	(United Kingdom of Great Britain and Ireland) Upper Canada	For private owner.
29 July	Symmetry	Full-rigged ship	William Gibson	Hull	United Kingdom	For Hull Shipping Company.
July	Amulet	Merchantman	John M. Gales	Sunderland	United Kingdom	For G. Noble.
July	Conqueror	Tug	Messrs. Robert Duncan & Co.	Greenock	United Kingdom	For Clyde Shipping Company.
July	Countess of Durham	Snow	T. Lightfoot	Sunderland	United Kingdom	For W. & J. Carr.
July	Duke of Wellington	Barque			United Kingdom	For private owner.
July	Euclid	Schooner	W. Pringle	Sunderland	United Kingdom	For W. Pringle.
July	Jane	Snow	J. Crown	Sunderland	United Kingdom	For Mr. Thompson.
July	Placid	Snow	W. Thompson & Pearson	Sunderland	United Kingdom	For Mr. Thompson.
1 August	Three Sisters	Schooner	Samuel Mason	Runcorn	United Kingdom	For Mr. Dalzell & others.
13 August	Anglesea	Schooner	William Bayley	Ipswich	United Kingdom	For Mr. Rowland.
13 August	Helen and Mary	Barque	S. & P. Mills	Sunderland	United Kingdom	For George Palmer.
25 August	Father Thames	Steamship	Messrs. Ditchburn & Co.	Blackwall, London	United Kingdom	For private owner.
27 August	Lucy	Schooner	E. Evans	Port Madoc	United Kingdom	For private owner.
27 August	St George	Caledonia-class ship of the line		Plymouth	United Kingdom	For Royal Navy.
28 August	Henry Taylor	Snow	Messrs. Bowman and Drummond	Blyth	United Kingdom	For Matthew Gray and others.
29 August	Roseanna	Merchantman	John Johnson	Liverpool	United Kingdom	For private owner.
30 August	Maria Theresa	Frigate		Naples	Kingdom of the Two Sicilies	For Royal Sicilian Navy.
30 August	Standerings	Brig	Gutteridge	Selby	United Kingdom	For private owner.
31 August	Mary Ann	Schooner	William Elwood	Grimsby	United Kingdom	For Messrs. Shillito & Jackson.
August	Aid	Merchantman	T. & N. Davie	Sunderland	United Kingdom	For Mr. Dobbing.
August	Alderman Pirie	Merchantman	Kirkbride & Carruthers	Sunderland	United Kingdom	For William Ord & Co.
August	Dart	Schooner	Wilson Chilton	Sunderland	United Kingdom	For Ord & Co.
August	Thorney Close	Merchantman	Cuthbert Potts	Sunderland	United Kingdom	For T. Young.
August	Tyro	Snow	Walker	Sunderland	United Kingdom	For G. Foster.
August	Water Lily	Snow	Atkinson & Pile	Sunderland	United Kingdom	For S. & P. Mills.
August	Welcome Home	Snow	J. Watson	Sunderland	United Kingdom	For Booth & Co.
5 September	Albert	Albert-class paddle steamer	John Laird	North Birkenhead	United Kingdom	For Royal Navy.
11 September	Reliance	Barque	James Geddes	Peterhead	United Kingdom	For Messrs. Arbuthnot & Anderson.
12 September	Antilles	West Indiaman	Messrs. Peile, Scott & Co.	Whitehaven	United Kingdom	For Joseph Bushby.
12 September	Columbia	Steamship	Messrs. Robert Steele & Co.	Greenock	United Kingdom	For Halifax Line.
12 September	Walkington	Brig	Messrs. Miller and Co.	River Humber	United Kingdom	For Messrs. W. and C. L. Ringrose.
14 September	Alpha	Brig	Stevenson	Preston	United Kingdom	For Robert Martin and T. Dewhurst.
14 September	Syren	Barque	Messrs. Lumley, Kennedy & Co.	Whitehaven	United Kingdom	For Joseph Mondel.
28 September	London	Rodney-class ship of the line		Chatham Dockyard	United Kingdom	For Royal Navy.
28 September	Polyphemus	Alecto-class sloop		Sheerness Dockyard	United Kingdom	For Royal Navy.
September	Elizabeth & Sarah	Merchantman	James Leithead	Sunderland	United Kingdom	For James Leithead.
September	Eston Nab	Merchantman	J. Stobart	Sunderland	United Kingdom	For private owner.
September	Good Design	Schooner	Atkingson & Pile	Southwick	United Kingdom	For Mr Hoseason.
September	Grace Darling	Brig		Liverpool	United Kingdom	For private owner.
September	Mark Palmer	Full-rigged ship	Austin & Mills	Sunderland	United Kingdom	For Palmer & Co.
September	Trident	Steamship	Messrs. Wigram & Green	Blackwall	United Kingdom	For General Steam Navigation Company.
3 October	Wilberforce	Albert-class paddle steamer	John Laird	North Birkenhead	United Kingdom	For Royal Navy.
10 October	Archimedes	Brigantine	Oliver Chapman	Chepstow	United Kingdom	For C. F. Bennett.
12 October	Alpha	Brig	Messrs. Turnbull & Co.	Larpool Wood	United Kingdom	For Messrs. Turnbull & Co.
12 October	Janet & Catherine	Hermaphrodite schooner	Messrs. Scott & Stevenson	Peterhead	United Kingdom	For private owner.
13 October	Competitor	Schooner	Messrs. Read and Page	Ipswich	United Kingdom	For James Cuckow, John Cobbold and W. R. Mulley.
13 October	George Lidell	Merchantman	Messrs. Hunter & Sons	Wincolmlee	United Kingdom	For private owner.
15 October	Mongibello	Steamship	Pitcher	Northfleet	United Kingdom	For Steam Navigation Company.
15 October	Parroquet	Schooner	William Bayley	Ipswich	United Kingdom	For private owner.
27 October	Orion	Steamship	Messrs. Read & Pahe	Ipswich	United Kingdom	For private owner.
28 October	Benares	Full-rigged ship	L. Rose & Sons		United Kingdom	For private owner.
31 October	Uriil	Sultan Makhmud-class ship of the line	A. S. Akimov	Nicholaieff	Russia	For Imperial Russian Navy.
October	Alderman Thompson	Barque	Laing & Simey	Sunderland	United Kingdom	For P. Laing.
October	Earl of Leicester	Merchantman	John Stephenson	Newcastle upon Tyne	United Kingdom	For private owner.
October	Northam	Merchantman	E. T. Thompson & J. Teasdale	Sunderland	United Kingdom	For Mr Twynams.
October	Thomas & Joseph Crisp	Barque	W. Thompson & Pearson	Sunderland	United Kingdom	For T. Crisp.
9 November	The Lord Willoughby	Merchantman	John Whalley	Preston	United Kingdom	For private owner.
12 November	Syria	Snow	J. Crown	Sunderland	United Kingdom	For William Nicholson & Sons.
21 November	Bazaar	Mersey flat	James Gibson	Witton	United Kingdom	For Thoma Ferth.
24 November	Kamchatka	Steam frigate		New York	United States	For Imperial Russian Navy.
25 November	Echo	Sloop	R. Banks	Boston	United Kingdom	For private owner.
27 November	Pénélope	Frigate		Lorient	France	For French Navy.
November	Elizabeth	Merchantman		Sunderland	United Kingdom	For Mr. Stephens.
10 December	Harriet	Schooner	Gutteridge	Selby	United Kingdom	For William Dunhill.
12 December	Will-o-the-Wisp	Schooner	Messrs. Humble & Milcrest	Liverpool	United Kingdom	For private owner.
17 December	Barbara	Barque	Coppin	Londonderry	United Kingdom	For Daniel Baird & Co.
24 December	Driver	Driver-class sloop		Portsmouth Dockyard	United Kingdom	For Royal Navy.
December	Janet Muir	Brig		River Tyne	United Kingdom	For private owner.
December	Princess	Merchantman	Spencer & Todd	Sunderland	United Kingdom	For Mr. Hutchinson.
Spring	Baitus	Schooner	Messrs. Read & Page	Ipswich	United Kingdom	For Liverpool and London Shipping Company.
Spring	Xanthus	Schooner	Messrs. Read & Page	Ipswich	United Kingdom	For Liverpool and London Shipping Company.
Unknown date	Abbotsford	Schooner	Peter Austin	Sunderland	United Kingdom	For John Fisher.
Unknown date	Adamant	Merchantman		Sunderland	United Kingdom	For private owner.
Unknown date	Admiral	Merchantman	Reed & Banfield	Sunderland	United Kingdom	For Panton & Co.
Unknown date	Advice	Schooner		Sunderland	United Kingdom	For Mr. Garbutt.
Unknown date	Alarm	Yacht	Messrs. Wanhill	Poole	United Kingdom	For private owner.
Unknown date	Ancona	Merchantman	G. Noble	Sunderland	United Kingdom	For G. Noble.
Unknown date	Anglona	Opium clipper	Brown & Bell	New York	United States	For Russell & Co.
Unknown date	Ann Carr	Schooner	G. W. & W. J. Hall	Sunderland	United Kingdom	For Mr. Carr.
Unknown date	Anne	Snow	Bartram & Lister	Sunderland	United Kingdom	For R. Hutchinson & Thompson.
Unknown date	Arab	Merchantman		Sunderland	United Kingdom	For W. Brown.
Unknown date	Ariadne	Sloop-of-war		Bombay	India	For British East India Company.
Unknown date	Arve	Snow	J. Stobart	Sunderland	United Kingdom	For Mr. Moon.
Unknown date	Auckland	Frigate		Bombay	India	For British East India Company.
Unknown date	Autumnus	Barque	S. & P. Mills	Sunderland	United Kingdom	For S. & P. Mills.
Unknown date	Bee's Wing	Merchantman	W. Doxford	Sunderland	United Kingdom	For John Robson, John Crossby and William Walker.
Unknown date	Bella Marina	Full-rigged ship		Maryport	United Kingdom	For private owner.
Unknown date	Bethesda	Schooner	W. Hetherington	Sunderland	United Kingdom	For W. Hetherington.
Unknown date	Britannia	Snow	Joshua Helmsley	Sunderland	United Kingdom	For J. Kemp.
Unknown date	British Queen	Schooner	John Anderton	Runcorn	United Kingdom	For private owner.
Unknown date	Cataraqui	Barque	Williams Lampson	Quebec	(United Kingdom of Great Britain and Ireland) Upper Canada	For Smith & Sons.
Unknown date	Chile	Frigate		Bordeaux	France	For Chilean Navy.
Unknown date	Commerce	Merchantman		Sunderland	United Kingdom	For private owner.
Unknown date	Commodore	Snow	G. Thompson	Monkwearmouth	United Kingdom	For Mr. Thompson.
Unknown date	Commodore Napier	Snow		Sunderland	United Kingdom	For Law & Co.
Unknown date	Concord	Snow	Tiffin	Monkwearmouth	United Kingdom	For T. Shotton.
Unknown date	Cossack	Snow	James Leithead	Sunderland	United Kingdom	For John Webster.
Unknown date	Cove	Snow	Jolly & Turnbull	Sunderland	United Kingdom	For Mr. Soulsby.
Unknown date	Diana	Whaler		Bremen	Bremen	For private owner.
Unknown date	Dragon Fly	Paddle tug	Allen & Luly	Neath	United Kingdom}	For John Rowland, Evan Thomas & Nathaniel Tregelles.
Unknown date	Dundee	Barque	T. Ogden	Sunderland	United Kingdom	For Mr. Borrie.
Unknown date	Earl Durham	Barque	Austin & Mills	Sunderland	United Kingdom	For Gateshead & Tyne Shipping Co.
Unknown date	Earl Talbot	Snow	John M. Gales	Sunderland	United Kingdom	For Mr. Thompson.
Unknown date	Eleanor	Merchantman	George Frater & Co	Sunderland	United Kingdom	For Mr. Leadbetter.
Unknown date	Eleanor Lancaster	Barque		Maryport	United Kingdom	For David Laidman.
Unknown date	Elizabeth Hunter	Merchantman	J. Hunter	Sunderland	United Kingdom	For Thomas Hunter.
Unknown date	Falcon	Snow	W. Wilkinson	Sunderland	United Kingdom	For Mr. Thompson.
Unknown date	Fernet	Brig		Plymouth	United Kingdom	For private owner.
Unknown date	Fiddler	Tug			United Kingdom	For Messrs. West & Co.
Unknown date	Gazelle	Snow	Robert Thompson	Sunderland	United Kingdom	For R. Thomas.
Unknown date	Glenburnie	Barque			(United Kingdom of Great Britain and Ireland) Colony of Prince Edward Island	For T. Chanter.
Unknown date	Governor Gawler	Schooner	Emanuel Underwood	Port River	(United Kingdom of Great Britain and Ireland) South Australia	For Emanuel Underwood.
Unknown date	Harmony	Snow	W. Spowers & Co	Sunderland	United Kingdom	For Mr. Thompson.
Unknown date	Harmony	Full-rigged ship		Quebec	(United Kingdom of Great Britain and Ireland) Upper Canada	For private owner.
Unknown date	Hector	Schooner	Noble	Sunderland	United Kingdom	For Hudson & Co.
Unknown date	IJssel	Fourth rate		Rotterdam	Netherlands	For Royal Netherlands Navy.
Unknown date	Iö	Snow	Peter Austin	Sunderland	United Kingdom	For Hunter & Co.
Unknown date	Isabella Blyth	Barque		Cowes	United Kingdom	For private owner.
Unknown date	Jane	Merchantman	John M. Gales	Sunderland	United Kingdom	For P. Madden.
Unknown date	Jane & Isabella	Merchantman	W. Doxford	Sunderland	United Kingdom	For Christopher Elliot, Robert Reed and Thomas Smith.
Unknown date	John	Schooner	Brundrit & Whiteway	Runcorn	United Kingdom	For private owner.
Unknown date	John & Ann	Merchantman	H. Ferguson	Sunderland	United Kingdom	For J. Ray.
Unknown date	John Line	Merchantman	Laing & Simey	Sunderland	United Kingdom	For Pirie & Co.
Unknown date	Juventus	Snow	Benjamin Brown	Sunderland	United Kingdom	For Mr. Speeding.
Unknown date	Kestrel	Brigantine	T. & J. Brocklebank	Whitehaven	United Kingdom	For private owner.
Unknown date	Koerier	Full-rigged ship		Vlissingen	Netherlands	For Royal Netherlands Navy.
Unknown date	Louisa	Merchantman		Sunderland	United Kingdom	For Lechen & Co.
Unknown date	Lydia	Barque			United States	For private owner.
Unknown date	Maid of Athens	Merchantman	Stothard	Sunderland	United Kingdom	For G. Forster.
Unknown date	Manico	Brig	John Briggs	Ramsey	Isle of Man	For John Coulthard.
Unknown date	Mariner's Hope	Merchantman	W. Petrie	Sunderland	United Kingdom	For Petrie & Co.
Unknown date	Marsden	Brig		Hylton	United Kingdom	For T. Gibson.
Unknown date	Martha	Schooner	Frederick Baddeley	Brixham	United Kingdom	For Frederick Baddeley.
Unknown date	Mary Ann Cook	Merchantman		Sunderland	United Kingdom	For William Cook.
Unknown date	Mary Bartram	Merchantman	Bartram & Lister	Sunderland	United Kingdom	For R. Hutchison.
Unknown date	Mary Ridley	Merchantman	Laing & Simey	Sunderland	United Kingdom	For Laing & Co.
Unknown date	Matthew	Snow	G. Thompson	Sunderland	United Kingdom	For Mr. Thompson.
Unknown date	Mayor	Merchantman	C. Taylor	Sunderland	United Kingdom	For J. R. Tuer.
Unknown date	Medusa	Sloop-of-war		Bombay	India	For British East India Company.
Unknown date	Meg Lee	Brig		Sunderland	United Kingdom	For J. & W. Carr.
Unknown date	Mermaid	Steamship		Blackwall, London	United Kingdom	For J. and G. Rennie.
Unknown date	Minstrel	Snow	George Frater & Co	Sunderland	United Kingdom	For Ord & Co.
Unknown date	Model	Schooner	Nicholas Butson	Polruan	United Kingdom	For private owner.
Unknown date	Nestor	Merchantman	Cuthbert Potts	Sunderland	United Kingdom	For S. & T. Mills.
Unknown date	Nestor	Barque	J. Watson	Sunderland	United Kingdom	For Mr. Crawford.
Unknown date	Oak	Merchantman	builder	Sunderland	United Kingdom	For private owner.
Unknown date	Ocean	Snow	R. Dixon	Sunderland	United Kingdom	For Mr. Thompson.
Unknown date	Olinda	Barque	J. H. Robson	Claxheugh	United Kingdom	For Mr. Allhusen.
Unknown date	Onkahye	Schooner	William Capes	Williamsburg, New York	United States	For United States Navy.
Unknown date	Pallas	Snow	T. Elliot	Monkwearmouth	United Kingdom	For T. Jackson.
Unknown date	Parsee	Barque	Rodham & Todd	Sunderland	United Kingdom	For Hunter & Co.
Unknown date	Persian	Barque	Joshua Helmsley	Southwick	United Kingdom	For R. Bell.
Unknown date	Pet	Barque	H. Dobbinson	Sunderland	United Kingdom	For Mr. Dobbinson.
Unknown date	Planet	Steamship		Bombay	India	For British East India Company.
Unknown date	Poultons	Brigantine		Sunderland	United Kingdom	For Mr. Morrice.
Unknown date	Prince of Wales	Barque	J. Watson	Sunderland	United Kingdom	For Bell & Co.
Unknown date	Princess Royal	Merchantman	Bartram & Lister	Sunderland	United Kingdom	For S. Mease.
Unknown date	Princess Royal	Full-rigged ship	Daniel Brocklebank	Whitehaven	United Kingdom	For private owner.
Unknown date	Prospect	Snow	Byers	Sunderland	United Kingdom	For Mr. Thompson.
Unknown date	Pytho	Merchantman		Sunderland	United Kingdom	For S. & P. Mills.
Unknown date	Reflector	Barque		Southwick	United Kingdom	For Walker & Co.
Unknown date	Robert & Ann	Merchantman	W. Doxford	Sunderland	United Kingdom	For Clay & Co.
Unknown date	Robert & George	Snow	Bowman and Drummond	Blyth	United Kingdom	For Pow & Fawcus.
Unknown date	Rolla	Merchantman	J. Hutchinson	Sunderland	United Kingdom	For Mr. Hutchinson.
Unknown date	Rosalind	Snow	J. Watson	Sunderland	United Kingdom	For Blair & Co.
Unknown date	Royal Consort	Merchantman	James Leithead	Sunderland	United Kingdom	For H. Metcalf.
Unknown date	Satellite	Steamship		Bombay	India	For British East India Company.
Unknown date	Sedulous	Snow	M. Whitfield	Sunderland	United Kingdom	For Mr. Whitfield.
Unknown date	Shamrock	Snow	W. Petrie	Sunderland	United Kingdom	For Mr. Thompson.
Unknown date	Sirocco	Snow	Byers	Sunderland	United Kingdom	For W. Byers.
Unknown date	Snapopp	Man of war			Sweden	For Royal Swedish Navy.
Unknown date	Sons of Commerce	Barque		Sunderland	United Kingdom	For Mr. Mitcheson.
Unknown date	Stokesley	Merchantman	James Barkess	Sunderland	United Kingdom	For Page & Co.
Unknown date	Success	Full-rigged ship		Tenasserim	Burma	For Cockerell & Co.
Unknown date	Troubadour	Barque		Saint John's	(United Kingdom of Great Britain and Ireland) Colony of Newfoundland	For private owner.
Unknown date	Vanguard	Schooner	Noble	Sunderland	United Kingdom	For Mr. Thompson.
Unknown date	Vanguard	Snow	Rodham & Todd	Sunderland	United Kingdom	For Clark & Co.
Unknown date	Veracity	Snow	Hull & Sikes	Sunderland	United Kingdom	For Mr. Thompson.
Unknown date	William Thompson	Snow	W. Wilkinson	Sunderland	United Kingdom	For Mr. Thompson.
Unknown date	Vivid	Steamship	King	Vauxhall	United Kingdom	For private owner.
Unknown date	Yacht	Snow	Kevin & Sanderson	Sunderland	United Kingdom	For J. Ayre.
Unknown date	Zwaluw	Full-rigged ship		Dunkerque	France	For Royal Netherlands Navy.
