= List of ship launches in 1839 =

The list of ship launches in 1839 includes a chronological list of some ships launched in 1839.

Date	Ship	Class	Builder	Location	Country	Notes
1 January	Manilla	Barque	Clark & Nickson	Liverpool	United Kingdom	For T. Hatton.
3 January	Windermere	East Indiaman	E. Gibson	Hull	United Kingdom	For private owner.
14 January	Hecla	Hydra-class sloop	S. Read	Chatham Dockyard	United Kingdom	For Royal Navy.
15 January	Eliza Jane	Merchantman	J. H. Robson	Claxheugh	United Kingdom	For private owner.
16 January	Czar	Barque	H. & W. Carr	Southwick	United Kingdom	For J. T. Carr.
16 January	Victoria	Brig	Ransom & Ridley	Hastings	United Kingdom	For John Diplock.
16 January	Woolsington	Merchantman	George Thompson, or Thompson & Wilkinson	Pallion	United Kingdom	For J. Robson.
19 January	India	Paddle steamer	John Scott & Sons	Greenock	United Kingdom	For private owner.
21 January	Jane	Schooner	William Bayley	Ipswich	United Kingdom	For Mr. Whitnall.
28 January	The Mary and Elizabeth	Schooner	Craven	Wakefield	United Kingdom	For G. W. Harrison.
January	Argyra	Snow	Rodham & Todd	Sunderland	United Kingdom	For Tanner & Co.
January	Epsilon	Merchantman	E. Brown	Sunderland	United Kingdom	For Wear Shipping Company.
January	Harvest	Snow	W. Wilkinson	Sunderland	United Kingdom	For Mr. Wilkinson.
January	Maidstone	Snow	Cuthbert Potts	Sunderland	United Kingdom	For Mr. Thompson.
January	Margaret	Snow		Sunderland	United Kingdom	For Bell & Co.
January	Rockcliff	Snow	Joshua Helmsley	Sunderland	United Kingdom	For E. Graham.
11 February	Rossiya	First rate	New Admiralty Shipyard	Saint Petersburg	Russia	For Imperial Russian Navy.
12 February	Minerva	Schooner	Messrs. Bayley & Co.	Ipswich	United Kingdom	For Richard Bowton.
16 February	Baron Bramber	Merchantman	S. D. Olliver	Shoreham-by-Sea	United Kingdom	For private owner.
17 February	Gwen	Schooner	H. Jones	Port Madoc	United Kingdom	For private owner.
28 February	Radford	Brig	John Storey	Monkwearmouth	United Kingdom	For Gateshead & Tyne Shipping Company.
February	Beatitude	Merchantman	Peter Austin	Sunderland	United Kingdom	For Mr. Barnard.
February	Cornopia	Snow		Southwick	United Kingdom	For Mr. Middleton.
February	Erin	Merchantman	J. Rodgerson	Sunderland	United Kingdom	For Mr. Richardson.
February	Jane A. Milvain	Merchantman	W. Sutherland	Sunderland	United Kingdom	For H. Milvain.
February	Lydia Jane	Merchantman	Reed, Denton & Co.	Sunderland	United Kingdom	For J. Ritson.
February	Restless	Merchantman	Cuthbert Potts	Sunderland	United Kingdom	For Mr. Thompson.
February	Sarepta	Snow	J. Crown	Sunderland	United Kingdom	For Mr. Nicholson.
2 March	Lewes Castle	Schooner	Messrs. Rickman and Godlee	Lewes	United Kingdom	For private owner.
16 March	Indus	Indus-class ship of the line		Portsmouth Dockyard	United Kingdom	For Royal Navy.
16 March	Nicholai	Steamship	Taylor	Deptford	United Kingdom	For Emperor of Russia.
18 March	Owen Glendower	East Indiaman	Green, Wigram & Green	Blackwall	United Kingdom	For Messrs. Green.
18 March	Robert Stevenson	Dredger	Speakman	Preston	United Kingdom	For private owner.
29 March	Tactique	Tactique-class gun-brig		Rochefort	France	For French Navy.
30 March	Hecate	Hydra-class sloop		Chatham Dockyard	United Kingdom	For Royal Navy.
20 March	Vigie	Tactique-class gun-brig		Rochefort	France	For French Navy.
30 March	Victoria	Schooner	J. Christopher	Southwold	United Kingdom	For Simon Spicer.
March	Accord	Merchantman	T. S. Dixon	Sunderland	United Kingdom	For White & Co.
March	Ann Elizabeth	Brig	J. Stobart, or Stobart & Soppit	Sunderland	United Kingdom	For Ranson & Co.
March	Athens	Merchantman	W. Adamson	Sunderland	United Kingdom	For Mr. Adamson.
March	Exquisite	Merchantman	R. Taylor & Co	Sunderland	United Kingdom	For Mr. Baker.
March	Friend's Adventure	Snow	Lightfoot	Sunderland	United Kingdom	For Mr. Fisher.
March	Mary Alice	Merchantman	J. Crown	Sunderland	United Kingdom	For J. Ritson.
March	Marys	Merchantman	Reed & Banfield	Sunderland	United Kingdom	For Tanner & Co.
March	Raven	Merchantman	W. Potts	Sunderland	United Kingdom	For W. Potts.
March	Thomas Rowell	Merchantman	George Frater	Sunderland	United Kingdom	For Hartford & Durham Commercial Shipping Company.
6 April	Australasian Packet	Barque	Morrice	Milbrook	United Kingdom	For private owner.
9 April	Decatur	Dale-class sloop-of-war		New York Navy Yard	United States	For United States Navy.
13 April	Amazon	Barque	John M. Gales	Sunderland	United Kingdom	For John M. Gales.
15 April	George Clifford	Full-rigged ship	Messrs. Blumer & Co.	South Shields	United Kingdom	For private owner.
15 April	Marquis of Douro	Merchantman	Messrs. John Spence and Sons	Stockton-on-Tees	United Kingdom	For Messrs. Panton and Sons.
17 April	Survivor	Schooner	William Jones	Vaynol Arms	United Kingdom	For Joseph Jones and others.
24 April	Marion	[Dale-class sloop-of-war		Boston Navy Yard	United States	For United States Navy.
29 April	Elizabeth	Yacht	Michael Ratsey	Cowes	United Kingdom	For Augustus Moreton.
29 April	Emerald	Sloop	Messrs. Leake and Co.	Castleford	United Kingdom	For Mark Wright.
29 April	Fanny	Yacht	Joseph White	Cowes	United Kingdom	For T. P. Halsey.
30 April	Witch	Yacht	Joseph White	Cowes	United Kingdom	For Joseph Copley.
April	Arrow	Merchantman	J. Penman	Sunderland	United Kingdom	For H. Penman.
April	Chariot	Snow	J. Watson	Deptford	United Kingdom	For J. Miller.
April	Conservator	Snow	Robert Thompson	Sunderland	United Kingdom	For A. Brown.
April	Cubana	Snow	H. Panton	Sunderland	United Kingdom	For Ord & Co.
April	Earl of Lisbourne	Schooner	Messrs. Foulke and Evans	Aberystwyth	United Kingdom	For private owner.
April	Europe	Snow	J. Rodgerson	Sunderland	United Kingdom	For Mr. Thompson.
April	Exile	Merchantman	Edward Brown	Sunderland	United Kingdom	For Mr. Lamb.
April	George Guildford	Merchantman		Newcastle upon Tyne	United Kingdom	For private owner.
April	Hampden	Snow	F. Oliver	Sunderland	United Kingdom	For Mr. Atkinson.
April	Heber	Schooner	Reed & Banfield	Sunderland	United Kingdom	For Decent & Co.
April	Hexham	Merchantman	Rowntree	Sunderland	United Kingdom	For Mr. Gourlay.
April	Home	Merchantman	George Thompson	Sunderland	United Kingdom	For Mr. Thompson.
April	Hotspur	Merchantman	Kirkbrigde & partners	Sunderland	United Kingdom	For Ord & Co.
April	Lumley	Merchantman	T. S. Dixon	Sunderland	United Kingdom	For C. Wilson.
April	Quebec	Snow	T. & N. Davie	Sunderland	United Kingdom	For White & Co.
April	Thunder	Merchantman	J. Watson	Offerton Haugh	United Kingdom	For Nichol & Co.
April	Unity	Merchantman	Austin & Mills	Sunderland	United Kingdom	For Mr. Ebdell.
April	Water Witch	Snow	Alcock	Sunderland	United Kingdom	For C. Alcock.
1 May	Kestrel	Yacht	Joseph White	Cowes	United Kingdom	For Earl of Yarborough.
2 May	Queen	Yacht	Michael Ratsey	Cowes	United Kingdom	For Lindsey Burrell.
14 May	Alouette	Tactique-class gun-brig		Cherbourg	France	For French Navy.
14 May	Vedette	Tactique-class gun-brig		Cherbourg	France	For French Navy.
15 May	Queen	First rate		Portsmouth Dockyard	United Kingdom	For Royal Navy.
16 May	Boulonnaise	Tactique-class gun-brig		Cherbourg	France	For French Navy.
16 May	Messenger	Schooner		Waterford	United Kingdom	For private owner.
20 May	Achilles	Steamship	Messrs. Robert Steele & Co.	Greenock	United Kingdom	For private owner.
21 May	Maid	Barque	Messrs. Steel and Son	Liverpool	United Kingdom	For J. Mondel.
28 May	Crane	Alert-class brig-sloop		Woolwich Dockyard	United Kingdom	For Royal Navy.
28 May	Penrith	Snow	Austin & Mills	Sunderland	United Kingdom	For Port of Newcastle General Shipping Co.
28 May	Taylor	Snow	H. & W. Carr	Hylton Ferry	United Kingdom	For Gateshead & Tyne Shipping Co.
29 May	Humility	Schooner	Evan Evans	Port Madoc	United Kingdom	For private owner.
29 May	Jane and William	Smack	Evan Evans	Port Madoc	United Kingdom	For Roberts & Lloyd.
30 May	Ann Henzell	Merchantman	Messrs. Metcalfe & Son	South Shields	United Kingdom	For private owner
30 May	Fantome	Acorn-class brig-sloop		Chatham Dockyard	United Kingdom	For Royal Navy.
30 May	Queen	Paddle steamer	Curling & Young	Limehouse	United Kingdom	For British East India Company.
May	Belfast	Barque	Edward Oliver	Quebec	(United Kingdom of Great Britain and Ireland) Upper Canada	For private owner.
May	Belinda	Barque		Quebec	(United Kingdom of Great Britain and Ireland) Upper Canada	For private owner.
May	Independence	Full-rigged ship			United Kingdom	For private owner.
May	Maria	Snow	John M. Gales	Sunderland	United Kingdom	For J. Hay.
May	Wellington	Full-rigged ship	Edward Oliver	Quebec	(United Kingdom of Great Britain and Ireland) Upper Canada	For private owner.
May	William Pirie	Full-rigged ship		Quebec	(United Kingdom of Great Britain and Ireland) Upper Canada	For private owner.
7 June	Laura	Schooner	John Prichard	Glanydon	United Kingdom	For private owner.
8 June	Shamrock	Steamship	Messrs. George Lunnell & Col	Hotwells	United Kingdom	For Bristol Steam Navigation Company.
12 June	Charlotte	Merchantman	Messrs. Duncanson	Alloa	United Kingdom	For A. Macfarlane.
12 June	Josephine	Schooner	William Jones	Pwllheli	United Kingdom	For private owner.
13 June	Bridegroom	Steamship	Ditchburn and Mares	Blackwall	United Kingdom	For private owner.
13 June	Eglantine	Tactique-class gun-brig		Lorient	France	For French Navy.
13 June	Preble	Dale-class sloop-of-war		Portsmouth Navy Yard	United States	For United States Navy.
14 June	Euphemia	Brig	John Young	Leith	United Kingdom	For private owners.
17 June	Yorktown	Dale-class sloop-of-war		Norfolk Navy Yard	United States	For United States Navy.
27 June	Mary Charlotte Weber	Barque	Thomas Gales & partners	Hylton	United Kingdom	For Mr Thompson.
27 June	Orwell	Steamship	Ditchburn & Mares	Blackwall	United Kingdom	For Ipswich Steam Navigation Company.
28 June	Nile	Rodney-class ship of the line		Plymouth Dockyard	United Kingdom	For Royal Navy.
29 June	Daniel Dyer	Merchantman	Balley	Shoreham-by-Sea	United Kingdom	For private owner.
29 June	Duchess of Lancaster	Steamship	John Laird	North Birkenhead	United Kingdom	For private owner.
29 June	Henry Benness	Schooner	W. Chilton	Pallion	United Kingdom	For H. Seard.
29 June	Royal George	Steamship	Tod & McGregor	Glasgow	United Kingdom	For private owner.
June	Aerial	Merchantman		Hylton	United Kingdom	For Mr. Robinson.
June	Challenger	Schooner	Messrs. White and Co.	Waterford	United Kingdom	For private owner.
June	Cowan	Merchantman	Woods & Spence	Sunderland	United Kingdom	For William Wood & Thomas Hood Harrison.
June	Gee	Brig	Samuel Gutteridge	Selby	United Kingdom	For Joshua Parrott.
June	Lena	Merchantman	James Leithead	Sunderland	United Kingdom	For Woods & Co.
June	Mary Elizabeth	Barque	R. Reay	Sunderland	United Kingdom	For Jones & Co.
June	Oberon	Barque		Saint John	(United Kingdom of Great Britain and Ireland) Colony of New Brunswick	For private owner.
June	Rewson	Ship of the line			Russia	For Imperial Russian Navy.
June	Standard	Snow	J. Mills	Sunderland	United Kingdom	For Mr. Greenwell.
June	Storm King	Barque	James Robinson	Sunderland	United Kingdom	For Mr. Rowlinson.
June	Swan	Merchantman	J. Mills	Sunderland	United Kingdom	For Mr. Greenwell.
4 July	Pollock	Merchantman	J. H. Robson	Claxheugh	United Kingdom	For Gatesheat & Tyne Shipping Company.
10 July	Cyclops	Paddle frigate	Sir William Symonds	Pembroke Dockyard	United Kingdom	For Royal Navy.
11 July	Vesuvius	Stromboli-class sloop		Sheerness Dockyard	United Kingdom	For Royal Navy.
12 July	William	Schooner	Innes	Leith	United Kingdom	For Mr. Heddle and others.
13 July	Daylight	Steamship	Stephen Wood	Newcastle upon Tyne	United Kingdom	For private owner.
15 July	Scottish Maid	Schooner	Cochar & Hall.	Aberdeen	United Kingdom	For Alexander Nichol & George Munro.
25 July	John Barker	Brig	Messrs. Walker and Crown	Southwick	United Kingdom	For Joseph Leng.
26 July	Enterprize	Steamship		Port Annagh	United Kingdom	For Antrim and Tyrone Lough Neagh Steam-Ferry Company.
27 July	Vernon	Paddle Steamer	Greens	Blackwall Yard	United Kingdom	For British East India Company.
July	James Bales	Merchantman	R. Dixon	Sunderland	United Kingdom	For W. Briggs.
July	John Bull	Full-rigged ship	Thomas H. Oliver	Quebec	(United Kingdom of Great Britain and Ireland) Upper Canada	For private owner.
July	Martha	Merchantman	James Leithead	Sunderland	United Kingdom	For James Leithead.
July	Ulster	Brigantine		Saint John	(United Kingdom of Great Britain and Ireland) Colony of New Brunswick	For private owner.
July	Washington	Barque	Reed, Denton & Taylor, or Reed, Denton & Co	Sunderland	United Kingdom	For Hull Shipping Company.
1 August	John G. Whilldin	Pilot schooner	Joseph Vogle	Southwark, Pennsylvania	United States	For private owner.
9 August	Latimer	Schooner	Thomas Gibbs	Holyhead	United Kingdom	For private owner.
9 August	Marchioness of Bute	Schooner		Newport	United Kingdom	For private owner.
10 August	Agricola	Barque	William Adamson	Sunderland	United Kingdom	For William Adamson.
10 August	Brockett	Brig	H. & W. Carr	Hylton	United Kingdom	For Gateshead & Tyne Shipping Company.
19 August	Alice	Steamship	Messrs. Page and Grantham	Liverpool	United Kingdom	For Francis Egerton.
19 August	Marsingale	Merchantman	James Reed	Sunderland	United Kingdom	For Mr. Wilkinson.
26 August	British Empire	Barque	Messrs. Young's	South Shields	United Kingdom	For private owner.
26 August	Era	Snow	George Thompson	Pallion	United Kingdom	For William Nicholson & Sons.
26 August	Houghton-le-Spring	Brig	Wilson Chilton	Pallion	United Kingdom	For R. Brown.
26 August	William	Merchantman	Henzell & Sons	Seaham	United Kingdom	For private owner.
27 August	Stromboli	Steam vessel		Portsmouth Dockyard	United Kingdom	For Royal Navy.
28 August	Delta	Snow	Alcock	Sunderland	United Kingdom	For Wear Shipping Company.
28 August	Lady Flora Hastings	Full-rigged ship	Edwards	South Shields	United Kingdom	For private owner.
29 August	Cuthbert Young	Merchantman	Messrs. Youngs	South Shields	United Kingdom	For private owner.
31 August	Araks	Brig	S. N. Neverov	Astrakhan	Russia	For Imperial Russian Navy.
31 August	Malton	Brig	John Storey	Monkwearmouth	United Kingdom	For Newcastle General Shipping Company.
August	Benjamin Scott	Schooner	Joseph Fletcher	Wells-next-the-Sea	United Kingdom	For private owner.
August	Eleanor	Snow	Joseph Helmsley	Sunderland	United Kingdom	For Mr. Thompson.
August	Friends	Snow	Rodham & Todd	Sunderland	United Kingdom	For Mr Roddam.
August	George Bell	Snow	W. Petrie	Sunderland	United Kingdom	For Gibbon & Co.
August	Harraton	Merchantman	J. H. Robson	Sunderland	United Kingdom	For J. Robson.
August	Maria Whitfield	Merchantman	J. Crown	Sunderland	United Kingdom	For Mr. Whitfield.
August	News	Merchantman	W. Wilkinson	Sunderland	United Kingdom	For P. Scott.
7 September	Alecto	Alecto-class sloop		Portsmouth Dockyard	United Kingdom	For Royal Navy.
9 September	Margaret	Schooner	William Hunt	Aldeburgh	United Kingdom	For Mr. Fennell.
10 September	Cosmopolitan	Schooner	Messrs. Read & Page	Ipswich	United Kingdom	For George Randfield Tovell.
10 September	Sesostris	Paddle frigate	Pitcher	Northfleet	United Kingdom	For Indian Navy.
12 September	Industry	Brig	Messrs. Turner & partners	South Shields	United Kingdom	For Messrs. Turner & partners.
14 September	Gem	Steamship	Thomas White	Cowes	United Kingdom	For private owner.
21 September	Prometheus	Alecto-class sloop		Sheerness Dockyard	United Kingdom	For Royal Navy.
25 September	James Duncan	Brig	Messrs. Charles Connell & Sons.	Glasgow	United Kingdom	For Messrs. Charles Connell & Sons.
September	Circassian	Merchantman	J. Crown	Sunderland	United Kingdom	For Mr. Nicholson.
September	Harrisons	Snow	James Barkes	Sunderland	United Kingdom	For Mr. Harrison.
September	Hope	Barque		Saint John	(United Kingdom of Great Britain and Ireland) Colony of New Brunswick	For private owner.
September	Horatio	Snow	W. Byers	Sunderland	United Kingdom	For Mr. Thompson.
September	Lady Howden	Merchantman	J. Storey	Monkwearmouth	United Kingdom	For J. Parkins.
September	Lucerne	Snow	J. & J. Laws	Sunderland	United Kingdom	For Elliott & Co.
September	McLeod	Merchantman	Austin & Mills	Sunderland	United Kingdom	For Gateshead & Tyne Shipping Co.
7 October	Forsyth	Merchantman	Thomas Forsyth	South Shields	United Kingdom	For private owner.
7 October	Persian	Acorn-class ship-sloop		Pembroke Dockyard	United Kingdom	For Royal Navy.
22 October	Edward and Mary	Merchantman		North Shields	United Kingdom	For F. Wright.
22 October	Monarch	East Indiaman	Messrs. Menzies & Son	Leith	United Kingdom	For Messrs. James Duncan & Co. and friends.
24 October	Nymph	Schooner	Richard Arthur Prichard	Pwllheli	United Kingdom	For private owner.
26 October	Zante Packet	Schooner		Southampton	United Kingdom	For Messrs. Oglebie & Co.
October	Coldstream	Snow	Austin & Mills	Sunderland	United Kingdom	For Smith & Co.
October	Souris	Brigantine		Saint John	(United Kingdom of Great Britain and Ireland) Colony of New Brunswick	For private owner.
5 November	The Marquis of Lansdowne	Schooner		Limerick	United Kingdom	For private owner
6 November	Mary Muir	Barque	Edwards	South Shields	United Kingdom	For Clint and partners.
6 November	Patrick Henry	Full-rigged ship	Brown & Bell	New York	United States	For Grinnell, Minturn & Co.
8 November	Dale	Dale-class sloop-of-war		Philadelphia Navy Yard	United States	For United States Navy.
9 November	City of Londonderry	Full-rigged ship	William Coppin	Londonderry	United Kingdom	For Gardner Bloggs.
19 November	Arkhangel Gavriil	Sultan Makhmud-class ship of the line	A. S. Akimov	Nicholaieff	Russia	For Imperial Russian Navy.
20 November	Isabella Watson	Barque	Messrs. Menzies & Sons	Leith	United Kingdom	For private owner.
21 November	Inflexible	Suffren-class ship of the line	Amédée-Ferdinand-Honoré-Marie Le Moyne de Sérigny	Rochefort	France	For French Navy.
23 June	Admiral	Steamship	John Wood	Port Glasgow	United Kingdom	For private owner.
23 November	Formby Lightship	Lightship	Peter Cato	Liverpool	United Kingdom	For Trinity House.
November	Carrs	Merchantman	H. & W. Carr	Sunderland	United Kingdom	For Carr & Co.
November	Myrene	Merchantman	Halls	Sunderland	United Kingdom	For Mr. Hall.
4 December	Louisa	Schooner	Joseph White	Cowes	United Kingdom	For Mr. O'Neill.
5 December	Friends	Sloop	Collinson	Wakefield	United Kingdom	For private owner.
9 December	President	Paddle steamer	Curle & Young	London	United Kingdom	For British and American Steam Navigation Company.
December	Ariadne	Paddle steamer	John Laird	Birkenhead	United Kingdom	For Indian Navy.
December	Atkinson	Full-rigged ship	G. Frater	Sunderland	United Kingdom	For Gateshead & Tyne Shipping Co.
December	Currency	Barque		Liverpool	United Kingdom	For private owner.
December	Delta	Merchantman			United Kingdom	For private owner.
December	Gondola	Schooner			United Kingdom	For private owner.
December	Weardale	Merchantman	J. Haswell	Sunderland	United Kingdom	For Mr. Thompson.
December	William Chapman	Merchantman	E. Milburn & W. Miller	Sunderland	United Kingdom	For Hartlepool Commercial Shipping Company.
Unknown date	Achilles	Merchantman		Sunderland	United Kingdom	For private owner
Unknown date	Admiraal van Kinsbergen	Merchantman		Rotterdam	Netherlands	For private owner.
Unknown date	Albion	Snow	Bowman and Drummond	Blyth	United Kingdom	For John Clarke and Charles Dunn.
Unknown date	Alexander Wise	Snow	S. & P. Mills	Sunderland	United Kingdom	For Wise & Co.
Unknown date	Arend	Full-rigged ship		Rotterdam	Netherlands	For Royal Netherlands Navy.
Unknown date	Austin	Sloop-of-war	William and George Gardner	Baltimore, Maryland	United States	For Texan Navy.
Unknown date	Belsay Castle	Snow	T. Rountree	Sunderland	United Kingdom	For Mr. Richardson.
Unknown date	Betsey & James	Snow	W. Doxford	Sunderland	United Kingdom	For Delaval & Co.
Unknown date	British Queen	Barque	H. Dobbinson	Sunderland	United Kingdom	For Dixon & Co.
Unknown date	Caledonia	Brig		Arbroath	United Kingdom	For private owner.
Unknown date	Canova	Merchantman	R. T. Andrews	Sunderland	United Kingdom	For Lindsay & Co.
Unknown date	Champion	Merchantman	Kevin & Sanderson	Sunderland	United Kingdom	For Mr. Doxford.
Unknown date	Cheetah	Merchantman	Wheeler	Cork	United Kingdom	For Messrs Charles & Edward Hart & Co.
Unknown date	Cleadon	Snow	H. Dobbinson	Sunderland	United Kingdom	For Mr Thompson.
Unknown date	Cleopatra	Paddle steamer	Thomas Pitcher	Northfleet	United Kingdom	For British East India Company.
Unknown date	Clio	Merchantman		Sunderland	United Kingdom	For Massam & Co.
Unknown date	Colorado	Brig	Schott & Whitney	Baltimore, Maryland	United States	For Texan Navy.
Unknown date	Columbine	Barque	J. Storey	Monkwearmouth	United Kingdom	For Gee & Co.
Unknown date	Comet	Steamboat		Bombay	India	For British East India Company.
Unknown date	Content	Snow	Greenwell & Sacker	Sunderland	United Kingdom	For Mr. Thompson.
Unknown date	Corinna	Snow	William Potts	Sunderland	United Kingdom	For W. Potts.
Unknown date	Douro	Schooner	Halls	Sunderland	United Kingdom	For private owner.
Unknown date	Dove	Snow	Stafford	Deptford	United Kingdom	For Lamb & Co.
Unknown date	Eagle	Snow	Hull & Sikes	Sunderland	United Kingdom	For W. Elliott.
Unknown date	East London	Barque		Sunderland	United Kingdom	For Mr. Mitchinson.
Unknown date	Egmond	Full-rigged ship		Dunkerque	France	For Royal Netherlands Navy.
Unknown date	Elizabeth	Snow	J. & L. Laws	Sunderland	United Kingdom	For T. Coxon.
Unknown date	Elizabeth Rowell	Merchantman	Bartram & Lister	Sunderland	United Kingdom	For Hartlepool Shipping Co.
Unknown date	Emlyn	Snow	H. & W. Carr	Sunderland	United Kingdom	For Mr. Peacock.
Unknown date	Equivalent	Merchantman	T. Lanchester	Sunderland	United Kingdom	For Richard Walker.
Unknown date	Fancy	Snow	Noble	Sunderland	United Kingdom	For Noble & Co.
Unknown date	Fleece	Merchantman	Bartram & Lister	Sunderland	United Kingdom	For Lamb & Dobin.
Unknown date	Flirt	Schooner	War Department	Baltimore, Maryland	United States	For United States Navy.
Unknown date	Frances	Schooner	William Paterson	Encounter Bay	(United Kingdom of Great Britain and Ireland) South Australia	For Mr. Thompson.
Unknown date	Gallant	Schooner	Nicholas Butson	Polruan	United Kingdom	For Joseph Treffry.
Unknown date	Goteborg	Man of war			Sweden	For Royal Swedish Navy.
Unknown date	Hannah	Merchantman	Harrison & Oliver	Sunderland	United Kingdom	For Union Shipping Co.
Unknown date	Harmony	Snow	J. Mills	Sunderland	United Kingdom	For Mr. Thompson.
Unknown date	Harriet	Merchantman	T. S. Dixon	Southwick	United Kingdom	For North & South Shields Shipping Co.
Unknown date	Hecla	Steamship	Adamson	Grangemouth	United Kingdom	For private owner.
Unknown date	Helene Hardy	Merchantman	Laing & Simey	Sunderland	United Kingdom	For Laing & Co.
Unknown date	Homer	Merchantman	E. Brown	Sunderland	United Kingdom	For Moore & Co.
Unknown date	Hotspur	Steam sloop	J. Watson	Sunderland	United Kingdom	For private owner.
Unknown date	Indus	Merchantman	H. & W. Carr	Sunderland	United Kingdom	For Mr. Nicholson.
Unknown date	Iodine	Merchantman	G. Frater	Sunderland	United Kingdom	For T. Speeding.
Unknown date	Iveston	Snow		Sunderland	United Kingdom	For J. G. Black.
Unknown date	James	Merchantman	Reed & Banfield	Sunderland	United Kingdom	For Mr. Culliford.
Unknown date	Jay	Snow	Jolly & Turnbull	Sunderland	United Kingdom	For Dobbin & Co.
Unknown date	Johannes	Brigantine		Helsinki	(Russian Empire) Grand Duchy of Finland	For private owner.
Unknown date	John & Isabella	Snow	Bartram & Lister	Sunderland	United Kingdom	For John Penman.
Unknown date	John & Isabella	Merchantman	Atkinson & Pile	Southwick	United Kingdom	For Heppel & Co.
Unknown date	Kenan Hasselaar	Merchantman		Rotterdam	Netherlands	For private owner.
Unknown date	Lady Williamson	Merchantman	George Frater & Co.	Sunderland	United Kingdom	For J. Vint.
Unknown date	Lalla Rookh	Barque	Edward Allen	St. Helier	Jersey	For private owner.
Unknown date	Lascar	Full-rigged ship			Isle of Man	For private owner.
Unknown date	Mary Gordon	Full-rigged ship		Bombay	India	Forprivate owner.
Unknown date	May	Merchantman	Robert Thompson	Sunderland	United Kingdom	For Smith & Co.
Unknown date	Messenger	Merchantman	W. Wilkinson	Sunderland	United Kingdom	For Mr. Thompson.
Unknown date	Meteor	Steamboat		Bombay	India	For British East India Company.
Unknown date	Middlesex	Merchantman	Laing & Simey	Sunderland	United Kingdom	For Duncan Dunbar & Co.
Unknown date	Monarch	Merchantman	J. & J. Laws	Sunderland	United Kingdom	For R. Dauson.
Unknown date	Nemesis	Paddle frigate	John Laird	Birkenhead	United Kingdom	For British East India Company.
Unknown date	Northern Light	Yacht	Whitemore & Holbrook	Boston, Massachusetts	United States	For William P. Winchester.
Unknown date	Orbicular	Snow	M. Whitefield	Sunderland	United Kingdom	For Messrs. Whitefields.
Unknown date	Phlegethon	Paddle steamer			United Kingdom	For Indian Navy.
Unknown date	Pluto	Paddle steamer			United Kingdom	For Indian Navy.
Unknown date	Protector	Merchantman	R. Young	Sunderland	United Kingdom	For Mr. Thompson.
Unknown date	Queen Victoria	Fishing trawler	Frederick Baddeley	Brixham	United Kingdom	For Frederick Baddeley, William Carlisle and others.
Unknown date	Richard & Hannah	Merchantman	S. & P. Mills	Sunderland	United Kingdom	For private owner.
Unknown date	Richard N. Parker	Schooner	W. & H. Browne	Passage West	United Kingdom	For private owner.
Unknown date	Rover	Merchantman	George Worthy	Sunderland	United Kingdom	For Laing & Co.
Unknown date	Sarah Scott	Barque	James Barkes & Co	Sunderland	United Kingdom	For Scott & Co.
Unknown date	Schiedam	Snow	B. Stafford	Sunderland	United Kingdom	For Francis Watking.
Unknown date	Scio	Merchantman	H. & W. Carr	Hylton	United Kingdom	For Wood & Co.
Unknown date	Sea Bird	Snow	R. T. Andrews	Sunderland	United Kingdom	For Parker & Co.
Unknown date	Seri Pervas	Steamboat		Trieste	Austria	For The Austrian Company.
Unknown date	Spray	Merchantman	J. Hutchinson	Sunderland	United Kingdom	For Mr. Hutchinson.
Unknown date	Tenasserim	Paddle sloop			United Kingdom	For Indian Navy.
Unknown date	Tomatin	Barque	Messrs. Robert Steel & Co.	Greenock	United Kingdom	For private owner.
Unknown date	Victoria	Steamship		Bombay	India	For British East India Company.
Unknown date	Viola	Merchantman	H. & W. Carr	Sunderland	United Kingdom	For private owner.
Unknown date	Violet	Snow	Lister & Bartram	Sunderland	United Kingdom	For T. Walker.
Unknown date	William Gowland	Merchantman	Joseph Helmsley	Sunderland	United Kingdom	For Mr. Gowland.
Unknown date	William Large	West Indiaman	Wheeler	Cork	United Kingdom	For Messrs. Large.
Unknown date	Zenith	Merchantman	Harrison & Oliver	Sunderland	United Kingdom	For Oliver & Co.
Unknown date	No. 1	Chain ferry	Acramans, Morgan & Co.	Bristol	United Kingdom	For Port of Portsmouth Floating Bridge Co.
