= Eleanor Lancaster =

Eleanor Lancaster may refer to:

- A candidate in the Progressive Conservative Party candidates, 1977 Ontario provincial election
- Eleanor Lancaster (ship), a 19th-century sailing ship

== See also ==
- Eleanor of Lancaster (1318–1372), fifth daughter of Henry, 3rd Earl of Lancaster and Maud Chaworth
