= Anglona (clipper) =

US sailing ship of the 1840s

History

United States
- Name: Anglona
- Owner: R.B. Forbes, Russell & Co.
- Builder: Brown & Bell, New York
- Launched: 1840

General characteristics
- Class & type: Opium clipper
- Tons burthen: 90 or 92 tons
- Sail plan: Schooner

The schooner Anglona was the first American opium clipper. She sailed in the Chinese coastal trade in the 1840s, and had a famous race with the schooner Ariel around Lintin Island.

== Construction ==
Anglona was a flush decked fore-and-aft schooner of the New York pilot boat type.

== Opium clipper in Chinese coastal trade ==
R.B. Forbes was interested in fast schooners for clipper and coastal service in China. The first clipper which Forbes sent to China, the Rose, foundered in the July typhoon of 1841.

Forbes purchased Anglona at Brown & Bell's New York yard for Russell & Co. for use as a despatch boat between Hong Kong, Macao, and Whampoa.

Other American pilot boat models sent to China in the 1840s included the Zephyr and the Spec, also built on the New York model. Shortly after Shanghai opened to foreign trade, three Boston pilot boats were sent: the 90 ton Golden Gate, the 90 ton Siren, and the 75 ton Daniel Webster, which served as pilot boats in the Yangtze River.

Within two weeks of purchase, Anglona sailed for China under Captain Turner. She arrived at Cape Horn in 61 days, and Java Head in 95 days.

Russell & Co put Anglona in service on the Canton River until the new treaty ports opened, at which time she was put in the coastal trade.

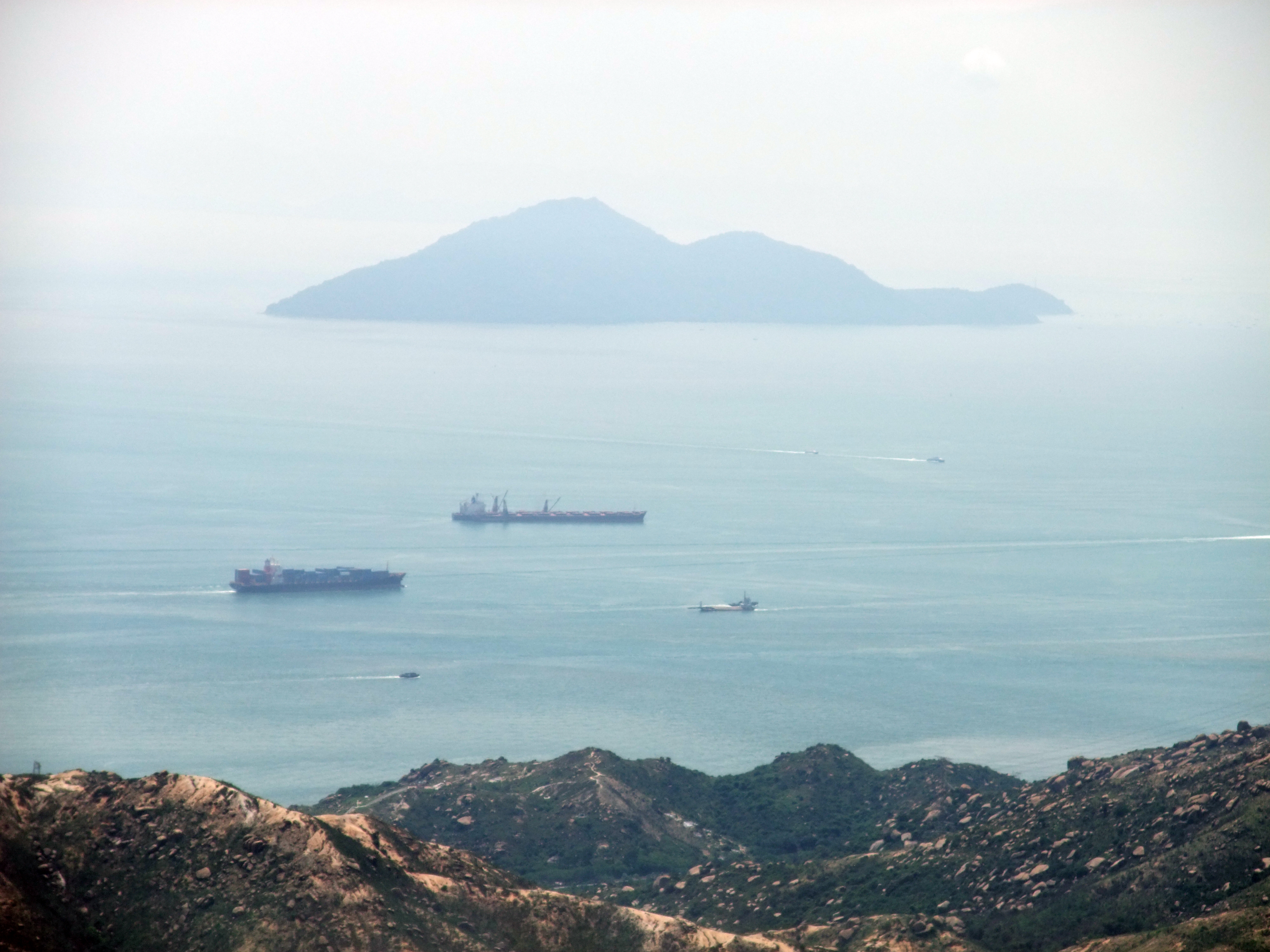
A view of Lintin Island from Castle Peak, Hong Kong

Captain Turner did not serve long, as he was knocked overboard by the mainboom during a sudden jibe, and drowned. In 1843, Anglona was under command of Capt. Abbot and Capt. Adamson; in 1844 she was under Captain Macfarlane.

On September 20, 1841, Anglona left Hong Kong with a 108-ton cargo of rice from Macao bound for the East Coast; on Dec. 2, she left Hong Kong with a 108-ton cargo from Macao of opium or specie bound for Namoa.

== Race around Lintin Island with schooner Ariel ==
Lee, the designer of the Rose, wanted to know why Forbes hadn't come to him for a clipper schooner instead, and got Forbes to agree to taking a half interest in one of his schooners if it could beat the Anglona.

The Ariel, a new 92-ton schooner built by Sprague & James at Medford, MA was taken out for a trial in 1841 out of Lewis Wharf in Boston Harbor, against the 30 ton schooner-yacht Breeze, which had been built for Forbes by Daniel C. Bacon and William H. Boardman. Lee was quite cocky and told Forbes that if he could sail the Ariel hard enough to capsize her, he would "give him his head for a football."

Forbes managed to do just that. The wind had freshened and was blowing in hard puffs. He had suggested taking in a second reef, but his companions assured him the wind would slacken as they approached the harbor. In stays off Sound Point Beacon, the Ariel laid down before she could get way on for a tack towards Long Island, and sank in seven fathoms of water.

When Ariel was refloated, Lee agreed to reduce the rig, and cut down the masts as per Forbes’ suggestion. Ariel was then sent to China under Capt. Poor, making an 80-day passage to Anjer.

The race between Ariel and Anglona was about 40 mi., from Macao Roads around Lintin and back, for stakes of $1,000 and Forbes’ agreement to take half-interest in Ariel if she won. Anglona was much stronger sailing to windward, due to the shallow draft of Ariel, and took the lead until rounding the island. At that point, Ariel set a large flying square sail and topsail. Anglona had no ballooning sails for running downwind, and was beaten by 17 minutes.

== See also ==
- List of clipper ships

== Online reading ==
- Jurien de la Graviere, Jean Pierre Edmond (1854). Voyage en Chine et dans les mers et archipels de cet empire pendant les annees 1847-1850. Paris. pp. 210–212. ISBN 9780543989468. OCLC 560232466. Description of Anglona in Chinese opium trade, in French
