= Lydia (whaling bark) =

United States historic place and shipwreck site

- The Lydia
- U.S. National Register of Historic Places
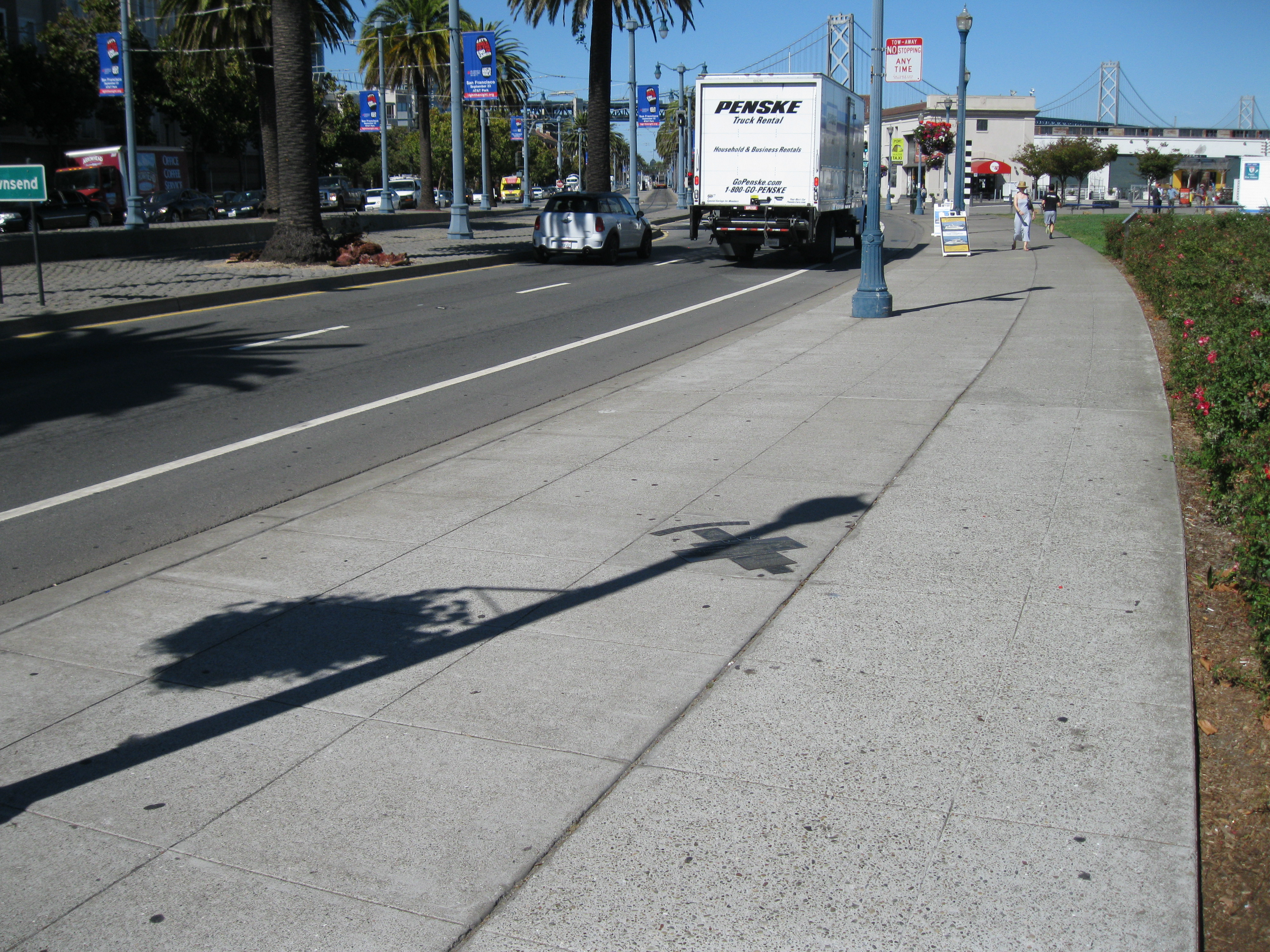
- Site of the shipwreck, which is buried below the street

- Location within San Francisco County Location within California Location within the United States
- Location: At the foot of King Street near Pier 42, San Francisco, California
- Coordinates: 37°46′51″N 122°23′18″W
- Area: 0.3 acres (0.12 ha)
- Built: 1840
- Built by: Meigs, Joseph & Sons
- NRHP reference No.: 81000173
- Added to NRHP: July 16, 1981

The Lydia is a wrecked whaling ship located below the foot of King Street in San Francisco, California. The ship was built in 1840 and wrecked in 1907. San Francisco was later built up over the site of the wreck, and it was not rediscovered until a sewer construction project unearthed the remains in 1980. The shipwreck included an intact case of twenty-four bottles of ginger beer brewed by A.S. Watson & Co. The shipwreck was added to the National Register of Historic Places in 1981, and a plaque marking the site was placed in 2005.

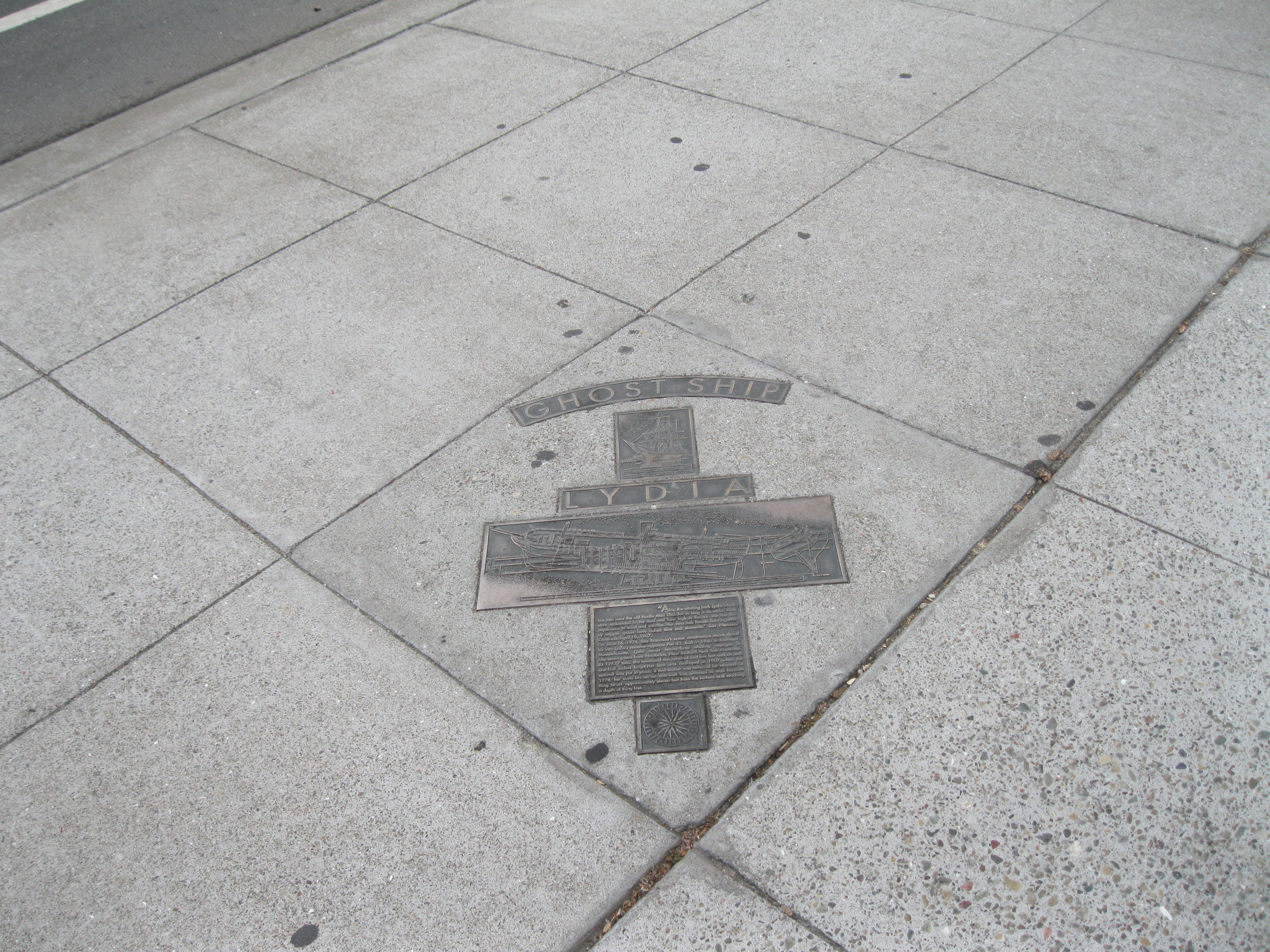
Plaque marking the exact site of the ship
