= Russian ship of the line Rossiya =

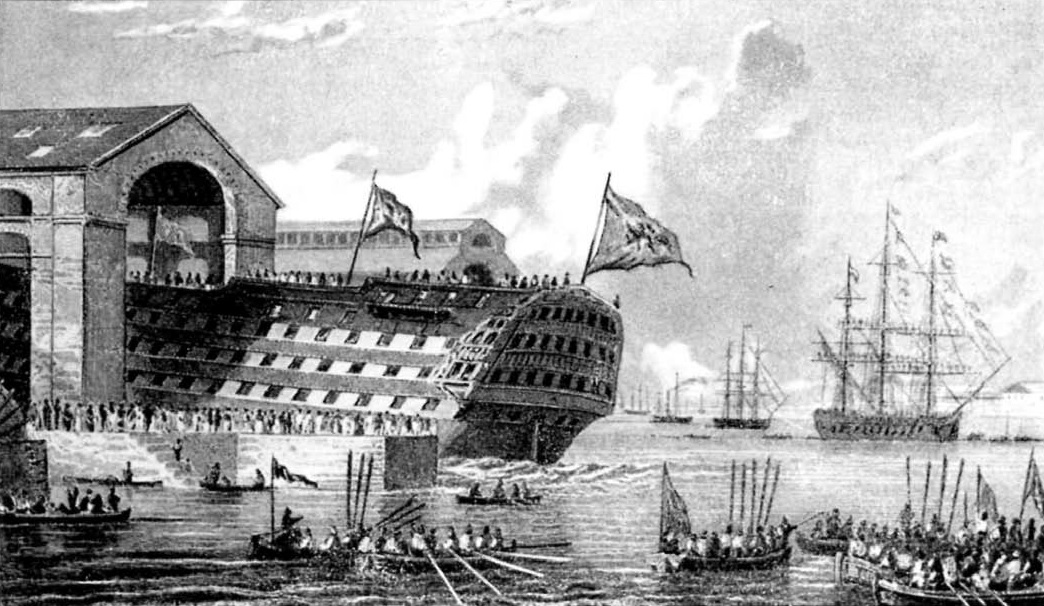
- Ship of the line Rossiya descends into the water

History

Russian Empire
- Name: Rossiya
- Namesake: Russia
- Builder: New Admiralty Shipyard, St. Petersburg
- Laid down: 11 February 1836 (Note: All dates used in this article are Old Style)
- Launched: 5 July 1839
- Decommissioned: 1856
- Stricken: 1860

General characteristics (as built)
- Type: 120/128-gun ship of the line
- Length: 208 ft (63.4 m)
- Beam: 55.5 ft (16.9 m)
- Depth of hold: 25 ft (7.6 m)
- Complement: 1,015 men
- Armament: 1839: 32 × 60-pounder (long); 32 × 60-pounder (short); 38 × 60-pounder gunnades; 22 × 60-pounder carronades; 2 × 96-pounder carronades; 4 × 2-pood shell guns; 1855: 30 × 60-pounder (long); 10 × 60-pounder (short); 20 × 36-pounder (short); 38 × 36-pounder gunnades; 16 × 36-pounder carronades; 4 × 2-pood shell guns

Rossiya (Russian: Россия) was the 120/128-gun first-rate ship of the line built for the Imperial Russian Navy in the late 1830s. The ship was assigned to the Baltic Fleet for her entire career. She was one of the ships deployed to Denmark during the First Schleswig War of 1848–50. She took part in the defence of Sveaborg during the Crimean War. Rossiya was decommissioned in 1856 and sold for scrap in 1860.

== Description ==
The constructor of Rossiya was Alexander Popov (father of the future admiral Andrei Popov). She was built as a First-rate 120-gun ship of the line. She was 208 feet (63.4 m) long between perpendiculars (195 ft keel), with a beam of about 55.5 feet (16.9 m) (55 feet and 4 or 8 inches according to various sources) and a depth of hold of about 25 ft (7.6 m) (24 feet 11 inches or 25 feet 1 inch according to various sources). She displaced 4,904 tons. At first she was equipped with an experimental uniform armament of 60-pounder cannons: long, short and gunnades on the lower, middle and upper decks, respectively, with the 60-pounder carronades on the forecastle and quarterdeck. Officially, these 60-pounders were considered as 48-pounders. Uniform armament of such a large caliber was installed on such a large ship of the Russian fleet for the first time. In 1854 and 1855, instead of the 60-pounders, 36-pounder gunnades and carronades were listed and part of the short 60-pounder guns were replaced by 36-pounder guns. The two 96-pounder carronades that were listed in 1839 disappeared later. Also at different times, several 2-pood or 1.5-pood shell guns were listed.

== Career ==
The ceremonial launch of the ship in the waters of Neva River took place on 5 July 5, 1839. The ship was tested in 1840 and in subsequent years sailed in the Baltic Sea (not further than Denmark). She was one of the ships sent to Denmark during the First Schleswig War of 1848–50 to help preserve Denmark's territorial integrity against Prussia. After the start of the Crimean War, she was based at the naval fortress Sveaborg (near Helsinki) with the Third Division of the Russian Baltic Fleet, while most of the Fleet took up positions in Kronstadt, on the outskirts of St. Petersburg. During the bombardment of Sveaborg on 28 July 1855, she took up an enfilading position between Bakholmen and Gustafsvärd islands. Defending the position she received 85 holes, the crew lost 11 people killed and 89 wounded. At night, she left this position. According to Andrew Lambert, this was achieved by Stork and Snapper gunboats, armed with Lancaster guns. Rossiya was decommissioned in 1856; from 1857 she was used as a floating barracks and she was sold for scrap in 1860.
