= HMS Polyphemus (1840) =

Sloop of the Royal Navy

History

United Kingdom
- Name: HMS Polyphemus
- Ordered: 25 February 1839
- Builder: Royal Dockyard, Sheerness
- Cost: £27,596
- Laid down: February 1840
- Launched: 28 September 1840
- Completed: 24 April 1841
- Commissioned: 25 February 1841
- Fate: Wrecked 29 January 1856

General characteristics
- Type: Steam Vessels (SV3); Third Class Sloop
- Displacement: 1,283 tons
- Tons burthen: 800 80/94 bm
- Length: 164 ft 0 in (50.0 m) gundeck; 142 ft 6.5 in (43.4 m) keel for tonnage
- Beam: 32 ft 8 in (10.0 m) maximum; 32 ft 6 in (9.9 m) for tonnage
- Draught: 6 ft 5 in (2.0 m)forward; 7 ft 6 in (2.3 m) forward
- Depth of hold: 18 ft 7 in (5.7 m)
- Installed power: 200 nominal horsepower
- Propulsion: 2-cylinder VSE direct acting steam engine; Paddles
- Armament: 2 × 32-pdr (42 cwt) MLSB guns on pivot mounts; 2 × 32-pdr (25 cwt) MLSB guns on broadside trucks

HMS Polyphemus was an Alecto-class sloop designed by Sir William Symonds, Surveyor of the Navy. Originally classed as a steam vessel (SV3), her classification would be changed to a Third Class Sloop. She initially served in the Mediterranean, west coast of Africa and the Baltic. She was wrecked on the Baltic side Jutland on 29 January 1856.

Polyphemus was the second named vessel since it was used for a 64-gun third rate, launched at Sheerness Dockyard on 27 April 1782, converted to a powder hulk in September 1813 and her breaking was completed at Chatham on 15 September 1827.

== Construction ==
She was ordered on 25 February 1839 from Chatham Dockyard with her keel laid in February 1840. She was launched on 28 September. Following her launch she was towed to Limehouse to have her boilers and machinery fitted. She returned to Chatham and was completed for sea on 24 April 1841 at an initial cost of £27,596 including the hull cost of £13,198 and machinery cost of £10,700. (Note: A total cost accounting for inflation of approximately £2,445,800 in today's money.)

== Commissioned service ==
=== First commission ===
Her first commission started on 25 February 1841 under the command of Lieutenant John Evans, RN for service in the Mediterranean. Lieutenant Evans died on 21 February 1843. Lieutenant Thomas Spark, RN took command two days later on the 23rd. The 23rd of April 1846 a new commander, Commander James Johnstone M'Cleverty, RN took and command and was assigned to the Channel Squadron. She was later returned to the Mediterranean where she rescued the brig Three Sisters from Rif Tribesmen on 8 November 1846. She changed commanders on 28 December 1848 to Commander Richard Borough Crawford, RN. She paid off on 11 April 1849 upon her return to Home Waters. She was repaired at Deptford and Woolwich at a cost of £16,601.

=== Second commission ===
She was commissioned on 16 February 1852 under Commander Charles Gerrans Phillips for service on the west coast of Africa, She returned and paid off at Portsmouth on 23 September 1854.

=== Third commission ===
She was commissioned under Commander Frederick Pelham Warren, RN for service in the Baltic on 22 October 1855.

== Disposition ==
She was wrecked on a steep sandy beach seven miles from Hansholme on the Baltic Coast of Jutland on 29 January 1856. She lost 27 members of her crew in the mishap. Her wreck was sold for £467.
