= HMS Prometheus (1839) =

Sloop of the Royal Navy

History

United Kingdom
- Name: HMS Prometheus
- Ordered: 25 February 1839
- Builder: Royal Dockyard, Sheerness
- Cost: £29,433
- Laid down: July 1839
- Launched: 21 September 1839
- Completed: 20 February 1840
- Commissioned: 21 November 1839
- Honours and awards: Crimea/Black Sea 1855
- Fate: Sold for breaking 5 March 1863

General characteristics
- Type: Steam Vessels (SV3); Third Class Sloop
- Displacement: 1,283 tons
- Tons burthen: 795 87/94 bm
- Length: 164 ft 0 in (50.0 m) gundeck; 141 ft 8 in (43.2 m) keel for tonnage
- Beam: 32 ft 8 in (10.0 m) maximum; 32 ft 6 in (9.9 m) for tonnage
- Draught: 6 ft 0 in (1.8 m)forward; 7 ft 7 in (2.3 m) forward
- Depth of hold: 18 ft 7 in (5.7 m)
- Installed power: 200 nominal horsepower
- Propulsion: 2-cylinder VSE direct acting steam engine; Paddles
- Armament: 2 × 32-pdr (42 cwt) MLSB guns on pivot mounts; 2 × 32-pdr (25 cwt) MLSB guns on broadside trucks

HMS Prometheus was an Alecto-class sloop designed by Sir William Symonds, Surveyor of the Navy. Originally classed as a steam vessel (SV3), her classification would be changed to a Third Class Sloop. She initially served mainly on the west coast of Africa on the anti-slavery patrol except for a brief period on particular service in the Black Sea in late 1855. She was sold on 5 March 1863 for breaking.

Prometheus was the second named vessel since it was used for an 18-gun fireship, Launched by Thompson of Southampton on 27 March 1807, assigned to harbour service in May 1819, then renamed Veteran on 2 May 1839 and broken in August 1852.

== Construction ==
She was ordered on 25 February 1839 from Sheerness Dockyard with her keel laid in July. She was launched about two months later on 21 September. Following her launch she was towed to Limehouse to have her boilers and machinery fitted. She returned to Sheerness and was completed for sea on 20 February 1840 at an initial cost of £29,433 including the machinery cost of £10,700. (Note: A total cost accounting for inflation of approximately £2,445,800 in today's money.)

== Commissioned service ==
=== First commission ===
Her first commission started on 21 November 1839 under the command of Lieutenant Thomas Spark, RN for service in the Mediterranean. Lieutenant Frederick Lowe, RN took command on 23 February 1843 for particular service. She was paid off on 27 March 1844. She was refitted and reboilered at a cost of 9,248 at Woolwich and Limehouse.

=== Second commission ===
She was commissioned on 15 May 1844 under the command of Lieutenant John Hay, RN for service on the west coast of Africa. Her first two years on the anti-slavery patrol were eventful. She took slavers Marinero on 13 September 1844, slaver Audaz on 23 October, Alberia on 18 April 1845, Tentador on 3 June, Suspiro on 6 July, Belmira on 11 November, Recuperador on 27 November, San Domingo and Eugrazia on 25 December and San Lorenzo on the 26th. She returned to Home waters to pay off on 2 September 1847. She underwent repairs at Woolwich and Deptford during 1848 and 1850 at a cost of 14,010.

=== Third commission ===
She commissioned under Commander Henry Richard Foote, RN for service on the west coast of Africa. She returned to Home Waters paying off at Woolwich on 3 January 1853.

=== Fourth commission ===
Prior to commissioning Prometheus was moved to Devonport. She commissioned at Devonport on 25 February 1854 under the command of Commander Edward Bridges Rice, RN for service on the west coast of Africa. She was in action against Rif tribesmen off Cape Treforeas on 26 June 1854. Commander Jasper Henry Selwyn, RN took command on the 12 of September 1854. By June 1855 she was in Home Waters. By September she had been assigned to particular service in the Black Sea during the Russian War. Commander Charles Webley Hope, RN took command on 19 January 1856. By June 1856 she was back on the west coast of Africa. She captured the slaver Adams Gray on 16 April 1857. She returned to Home Waters to pay off on 15 September 1857 at Woolwich. She was refitted at Woolwich at a cost of 14,520 form 1858 to 1859.

=== Fifth commission ===
Her last commission started on 19 October 1859 under Commander Sidmouth Stowell Skipwith, RN for service on the west coast of Africa. on 13 November 1860, Commander Norman Bernard Bedingfeld, RN took command. On 27 May 1861 she took the slaver Jacinta. She returned to home Waters paying off at Woolwich on 21 June 1862.

== Disposition ==
She was sent to Chatham Dockyard for repairs but found to be exceedingly rotten and deemed not economical to repair. She was sold to Henry Castle & Sons for £1,525 to be broken at Charlton.
