= Progressive Conservative Party of Ontario candidates in the 1977 Ontario provincial election =

The Progressive Conservative Party of Ontario ran a full slate of candidates in the 1977 Ontario provincial election, and won a minority government under the leadership of William Davis. Many of the party's candidates have their own biography pages; information on others may be found here.

== Eleanor Lancaster (St. Catharines) ==
Lancaster is an alumna of Brock University. She was 48 years old at the time of the election, and was known as a consumer activist (Toronto Star, 10 June 1977). She finished a close second against Liberal candidate Jim Bradley, receiving 11,669 votes (36.62%).

In 1984, Lancaster was listed as a part-time vice-chair of the Ontario Environmental Assessment Board, with a salary of $200 a day plus expenses (The Globe and Mail, 10 January 1984). Later in the 1980s, Lancaster served as chair of the Niagara Region's health services committee and supported fluoridation policies for the region (The Globe and Mail, 4 November 1987).

Lancaster is listed as a friend of the Niagara College Foundation, indicating a donation to the College of between $5,000 and $9,999. In 2002, she was listed as chair of the "Because We Care Campaign" for Hotel Dieu Hospital in St. Catharines.

As of 2005, Lancaster is listed as board chair of Goodwill Industries Niagara.
