= Eleanor Lancaster (ship) =

Ship

History

United Kingdom
- Name: Eleanor Lancaster
- Owner: David Laidman, Liverpool
- Laid down: 1839
- Launched: 1840
- Owner: Soutter & Co, London
- Acquired: 1845
- Fate: Wrecked in a gale on Oyster Bank, Newcastle, New South Wales, 7 November 1856
- Notes: One of seven ships to sail from Australia to San Francisco for the California Gold Rush, arriving 2 April 1849

General characteristics
- Class & type: 3-masted barque
- Tons burthen: 480 tons

The Eleanor Lancaster was a 3-masted barque built at Maryport in 1839. Launched in 1840, and initially registered in Liverpool, it was operated by David Laidman (named after his wife, Eleanor Ann Hannah née Lancaster, with Captain P.Cowley as captain. In 1845, the ship was re-registered in London and was operated by Soutter & Co, with Captain Francis Lodge in command.

The ship had a gross weight of 480 tons and was sheathed in copper until 1847, when it was re-sheathed in felt and yellow metal. Amongst its voyages, it sailed to Bombay, Port Phillip, Lima and Sydney.

The Lancaster was one of seven ships that sailed from Australia to San Francisco at the time of the California Gold Rush, leaving Sydney on 21 January 1849 and was the first to arrive in San Francisco on 2 April. Upon arrival, her crew apparently deserted and the captain used the ship along the Sacramento River, until she returned to San Francisco and was used as a bonded storeship until 1850.

On 7 November 1856, the ship was wrecked in a gale on Oyster Bank, Newcastle, New South Wales during passage from Newcastle to Melbourne with 640 tons of coal, under the command of Captain James McLean and with 15 crew. The crew clung to the rigging throughout the night and were finally rescued due to a seaman, William Skilton, who made several trips in a small boat to the wreck, despite raging seas.

The "Perilous Gate" is a 19th-century poem by an anonymous author, describing the shipwreck. It has been abridged into a song of the same name by Phyl Lobl.
