= Alecto-class sloop =

Class overview
- Name: Alecto-class sloop
- Builders: Chatham Dockyard; Sheerness Dockyard
- Operators: Royal Navy
- Preceded by: Stromboli class
- Succeeded by: Driver class
- Built: 1838–1842
- In commission: 1840–1865
- Completed: 4
- Lost: 1
- Retired: 3

General characteristics
- Type: Steam Vessels (SV3); Third Class Sloop
- Displacement: 1,283 tons
- Tons burthen: 800 58/94 bm
- Length: 164 ft 0 in (50.0 m) gundeck; 142 ft 6 in (43.4 m) keel for tonnage
- Beam: 32 ft 8 in (10.0 m) maximum; 32 ft 2 in (9.8 m) for tonnage
- Depth of hold: 18 ft 7 in (5.7 m)
- Installed power: 200 nominal horsepower
- Propulsion: 2-cylinder VSE direct acting steam engine; Paddles
- Armament: 2 × 32-pdr (42 cwt) MLSB guns on pivot mounts; 2 × 32-pdr (25 cwt) MLSB guns on broadside trucks

The Alecto-class steam vessels (SV3) later reclassed as Third Class Sloops, were designed by Sir William Symonds, the Surveyor of the Navy. The design was approved on 12 April 1839. Initially four vessels were ordered and completed. A fifth unit was ordered (Rattler), but was reordered as a screw propelled vessel. And a sixth unit had been ordered but was requested to be reordered to a different design. The screw driven Rattler participated in the first of three 'tug o- wars with the Alecto. The vessels all participated during the Russian War. All had gone to the breakers by the mid-1860s.

Alecto was the second named vessel since it was used for a 12-gun fireship, launched by King of Dover on 26 May 1781 and sold in 1802.

Ardent was the fifth named vessel since it was used for a 64-gun third rate, launched at Blaydes of Hull on 13 August 1764, captured by the French off Plymouth on 17 August 1779, recaptured in April 1782 and renamed Tiger then sold in June 1794.

Prometheus was the second named vessel since it was used for an 18-gun fireship, Launched by Thompson of Southampton on 27 March 1807, assigned to harbour service in May 1819, then renamed Veteran on 2 May 1839 and broken in August 1852.

Polyphemus was the second named vessel since it was used for a 64-gun third rate, launched at Sheerness Dockyard on 27 April 1782, converted to a powder hulk in September 1813 and her breaking was completed at Chatham on 15 September 1827.

== Design and specifications ==
The vessels were ordered in February 1839. The first two were laid down in July 1839 at Chatham and Sheerness Dockyards. The second pair were laid down at Chatham Dockyard in February 1840. The first two vessels (Alecto and Prometheus) were launched in July 1839 with Polyphemus launched in September 1840 and Ardent in February 1841. The gundeck was 164 feet 0 inches (49.99 metres) with the keel length of 142 feet 6 inches (43.43 metres) reported for tonnage. The maximum beam was 32 feet 8 inches (9.96 metres) with 32 feet 6 inches (9.91 metres) reported for tonnage. The depth of hold was 18 feet 7 inches (5.66 metres). The builder's measure calculated at 800 58/94 tons whereas the vessels displaced 878 tons.

Seaward and Capel of Millwall supplied the machinery for all vessels. They were equipped with two fire-tube rectangular boilers. The engines were 2-cylinder vertical single expansion (VSE) direct acting steam engines rated at 200 nominal horsepower (NHP).

All four ships were armed with two 32-pounder 42 hundredweight (cwt) (Note: "cwt", or "hundredweight" refers to the weight of the gun itself. "32-pounder" refers to the weight of the ball fired) muzzle-loading smoothbore (MLSB) guns on pivot mounts and two 32-pounder (25 cwt) MLSB carronades on broadside trucks.

== Initial cost of vessels ==
- Alecto: Total Cost £27,268 (including Machinery - £10,700) (Note: A total cost accounting for inflation of approximately £3,030,900 in today's money for Alecto.)
- Ardent: Total Cost £28,593 (Hull - £13,385; Machinery - £10,700; Fitting - £4,061) (Note: A total cost accounting for inflation of approximately £3,399,900 in today's money for Ardent.)
- Prometheus: Total Cost £29,433 (including Machinery - £10,700) (Note: A total cost accounting for inflation of approximately £3,109,900 in today's money for Prometheus.)
- Polyphemus: Total Cost £27,596 (Hull - £13,198; Machinery - £10,700; Fitting - £3,698) (Note: A total cost accounting for inflation of approximately £3,399,900 in today's money for Polyphemus.)

Alecto-class sloops
Name	Builder	Launched	Remarks
Alecto	Chatham Dockyard	7 September 1839	Broken November 1865
Prometheus	Sheerness Dockyard	21 September 1839	Broken 5 March 1863
Polyphemus	Chatham Dockyard	28 September 1840	Wrecked 29 January 1856
Ardent	Chatham Dockyard	12 February 1841	Broken 2 March 1865
