= Claxheugh =

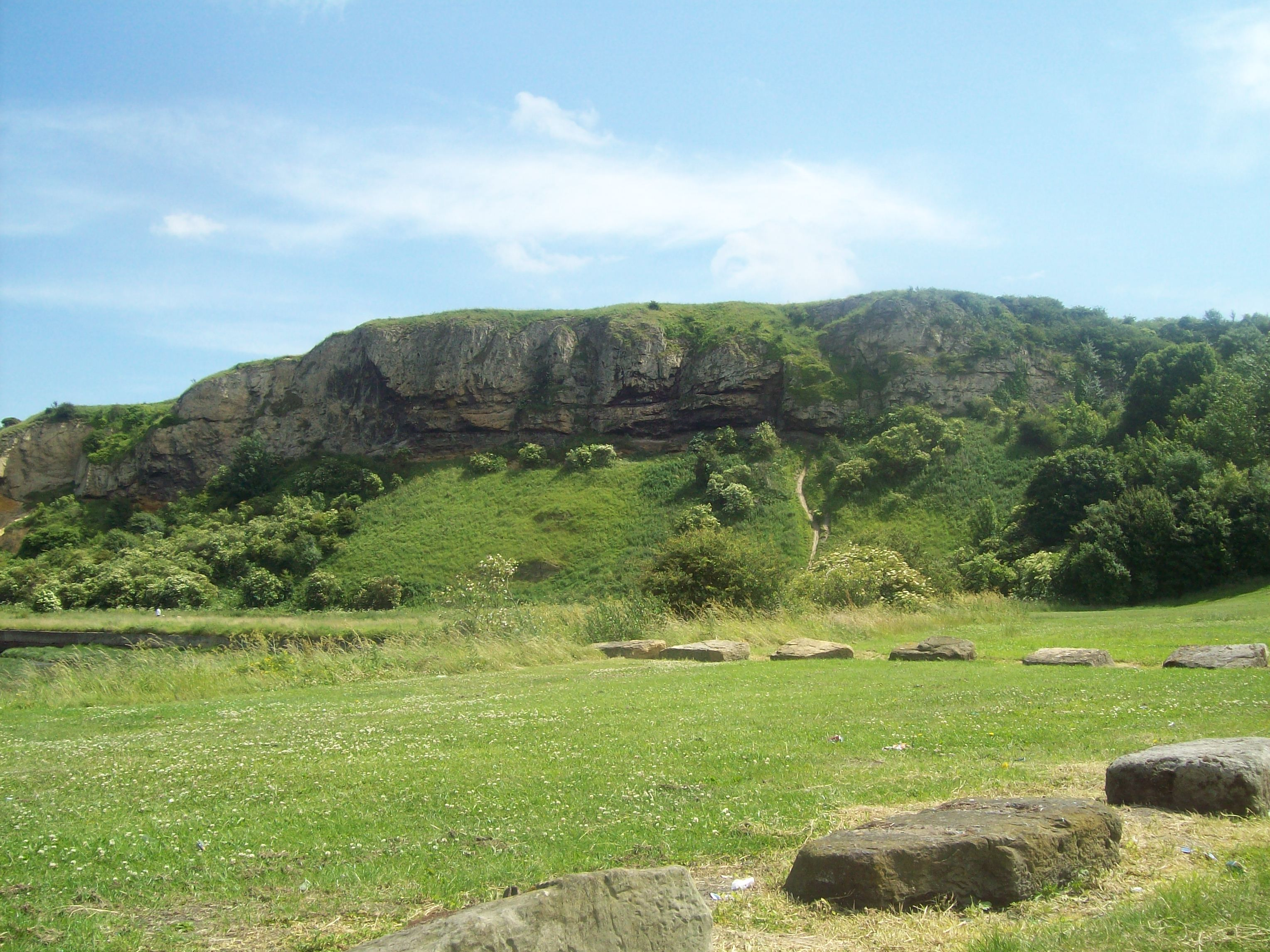
- Claxheugh Rock

- Location in Tyne and Wear
- Coordinates: 54.910°N 1.436°W
- OS grid reference: NZ362574
- Sovereign state: United Kingdom
- Country: England
- District: Tyne and Wear

Claxheugh (/ˈklætʃəf/ KLATCH-əf) is an area of South Hylton, Sunderland, Tyne and Wear, England. The area is primarily known for the large, limestone and sandstone cliff formed in the Late Permian period, known as Claxheugh Rock, which forms part of the Ford Formation. Stone from the rock was quarried in the 19th century. The rock is often referred to as 'klachy rock' by the locals. Claxheugh Rock is known as the rock of the wear by some and is home to many birds and wild animals, since 2003 the population of rabbit has decreased by over 60% by poachers and hunters.
