= Pullman =

Pullman may refer to:

== Places in the United States ==
- Pullman, Chicago, Illinois
- Pullman, Michigan
- Pullman, Texas
- Pullman, Washington
- Pullman, West Virginia
- Pullman Lake, a lake in Minnesota
- Pullman neighborhood, in the city of Richmond, California

== Surname ==
- Alberte Pullman (1920–2011), theoretical and quantum chemist, wife of Bernard
- Alfred Pullman (1916–1954), a British soldier and airman
- Bernard Pullman (1919–1996), theoretical and quantum chemist, husband of Alberte
- Bill Pullman (born 1953), American actor
- George Pullman (1831–1897), founder of the Pullman Company
- Joe Pullman (1876–1955), Wales international rugby union player
- Lewis Pullman (born 1993), American actor
- Philip Pullman (born 1946), English writer
- Simon Pullman (1890–1942), violinist and founder of the Warsaw Ghetto Symphony Orchestra

== Transport ==
=== Road ===
- Humber Pullman, a large automobile manufactured in central England between 1930 and 1954
- Mercedes-Benz S Class, German limousine of which variant models were known as Pullman
- Pullman automobile by Pullman Motor Company, maker of automobiles in York, Pennsylvania, U.S. from 1905 to 1917
- Pullman Coaches, a bus operating company in Wales acquired by Veolia Transport Cymru, now Crossgates Coaches
- York Pullman, a bus operating company in Yorkshire, England, UK

=== Rail ===
- Pullman Company, maker of Pullman rail cars
- Pullman porter, a man hired by the Pullman Company to work as porter on sleeping cars
- Pullman Strike, a major American railroad strike in 1894
- Pullman train (UK), mainline luxury railway services in Great Britain
- 111th Street/Pullman station, a rail station in Pullman, Chicago, Illinois
- West Pullman station, a rail station in West Pullman, Chicago, Illinois

=== Both ===
- Pullman (car or coach), luxurious railway cars, cars, buses or coaches

== Other uses ==
- Pullman (architecture), a long, narrow room
- Pullman (band), an American band formed in Chicago in the 1990s
- Pullman F.C., Pullman Company soccer team
- Pullman Hotels and Resorts, a brand part of the French AccorHotels group
- Pullman loaf, a long, square-edged loaf of bread
- Pullman Memorial Universalist Church, Albion, New York
- S. J. Pullman Stakes, a horse race at the former Cheltenham_Park_Racecourse in Adelaide, South Australia

== See also ==
- Pulman (disambiguation)
