= Robert Potter (politician, born 1800) =

Legislator, cabinet member, and signer of the Texas Declaration of Independence

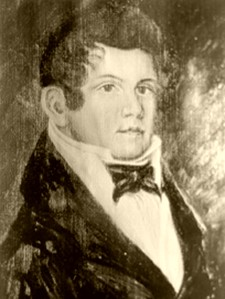

Member of the Republic of Texas House of Representatives from the Red River district
- In office 1837–1841

1st Secretary of the Navy of Texas (interim)
- In office March 17, 1836 – October 22, 1836
- Preceded by: Office established
- Succeeded by: Samuel Rhoads Fisher

Member of the U.S. House of Representatives from North Carolina's 6th district
- In office March 4, 1829 – November 1831
- Preceded by: Daniel Turner
- Succeeded by: Micajah T. Hawkins

Personal details
- Born: June 1800 Granville County, North Carolina, U.S.
- Died: March 2, 1842 (aged 41) Harrison County, Republic of Texas
- Cause of death: Gunshots
- Resting place: Texas State Cemetery, Austin, Texas, U.S.
- Party: Jacksonian

Robert Potter (June 1800 – March 2, 1842) was an American and Texian politician. Potter began his political career in North Carolina and represented the 6th district in the House of Representatives, but later settled in the Mexican state of Coahuila y Tejas where he became a Texas independence activist who was one of the signatories of the Texas Declaration of Independence. During the Texas Revolution, Potter served as the Secretary of the Navy as a member of interim president David G. Burnet's cabinet. After the war, Potter served as a member of the Republic of Texas House of Representatives.

== Early life ==
Potter was born in June 1800 in Granville County, North Carolina near Williamsboro (now part of Vance County, North Carolina). His early education was in the common schools. He served as a midshipman in the United States Navy from 1815 to 1821.

Potter subsequently studied law, was admitted to the bar, and practiced in Halifax, North Carolina and Oxford, North Carolina.

== Career ==
Potter was a member of the North Carolina House of Commons in 1826 and 1828. He was elected as a Jacksonian to the Twenty-first Congress and the Twenty-second Congress. He served from March 4, 1829, until his resignation in November 1831, after he attacked and castrated two men, whom he believed to be having adulterous relationships with his wife; however, in truth, he was attempting to obtain "grounds" for divorce from his wife, as he wanted to marry into a higher class. He was convicted of attacking the two men and served time in jail for his actions.

He again served as a member of the state House of Commons from 1834 until his expulsion in January 1835 either for "cheating at cards" or "for brandishing a gun and knife during a fight over a card game".

Potter moved to Harrison County, Texas, in 1835 and settled on a farm overlooking Caddo Lake, near Marshall, Texas. In Texas, he continued his political career, becoming a member of the Convention of 1836 which issued the Texas Declaration of Independence on March 2, 1836. During the Texas Revolution Potter was Secretary of the Navy in the cabinet of interim President David G. Burnet. He represented the Red River District in the Texas Congress in 1837–1841.

He participated in the Regulator–Moderator War in East Texas as a leader of the Harrison County Moderators.

== Death and legacy ==
On March 2, 1842, Potter's home was surrounded by a band of Regulators led by William Pinckney Rose. He ran to the edge of Lake Soda (Caddo Lake) and dove in, his body sinking to the bottom after being shot. He was interred at "Potter's Point", a bluff near his home; reinterred in the Texas State Cemetery, at Austin, Texas, in 1931. Potter County, Texas is named for him.

The historical novel Love is a Wild Assault, by Elithe Hamilton Kirkland is the story of his Texas wife or "paramour" as the central character.

== See also ==
- Twenty-first United States Congress
- Twenty-second United States Congress
- List of federal political scandals in the United States

U.S. House of Representatives
Preceded by Daniel Turner	Member of the U.S. House of Representatives from North Carolina's 6th congressional district 1829–1831	Succeeded by Micajah T. Hawkins
