= Memucan Hunt Jr. =

Texan politician (1807–1856)

Memucan Hunt
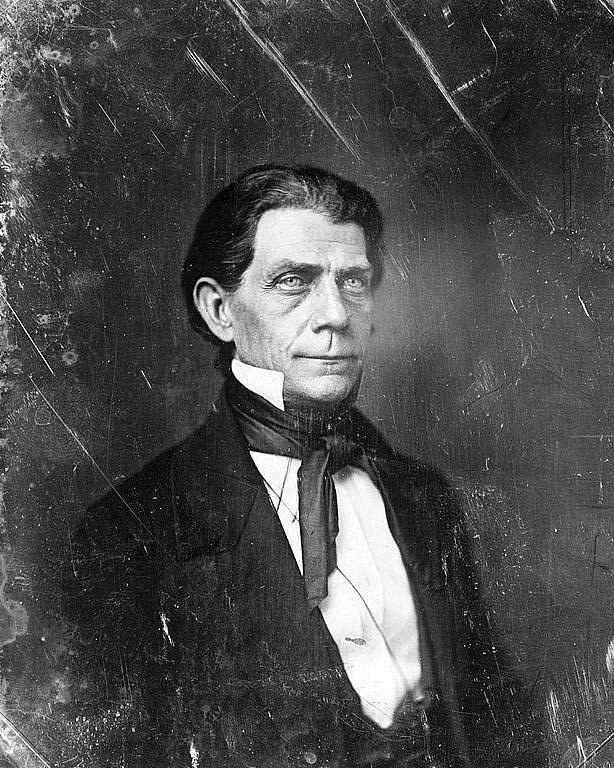

1st Republic of Texas Minister to the United States
- In office March 1837 – October 1839
- Preceded by: None
- Succeeded by: Anson Jones

3rd Secretary of the Navy of Texas
- In office December 13, 1838 – May 1839
- Preceded by: Samuel Rhoads Fisher
- Succeeded by: Louis P. Cooke

Personal details
- Born: August 7, 1807 Vance County, North Carolina, US
- Died: June 5, 1856 (aged 48) Tipton County, Tennessee, US
- Party: Democratic
- Spouse: Anne Taliaferro Howard

Memucan Hunt (August 7, 1807 – June 5, 1856) was the first minister of Texas to the United States, secretary of the Texas Navy, and a candidate for vice president of the Republic of Texas.

== Early life ==
Hunt was born on August 7, 1807, in Granville County, North Carolina, the son of Col. William Hunt and the grandson of Memucan Hunt. He was a planter and businessman who moved to Madison County, Mississippi, in 1834 to manage a plantation given to him by his father. Thomas Jefferson Green arrived in Mississippi to recruit volunteers to fight in the Texas Revolution. Hunt, along with neighbor James Pinckney Henderson and several hundred others, joined Green, arriving at Velasco in June 1836, after the Battle of San Jacinto.

== Service in Texas ==
Almost immediately upon arriving in Texas, Hunt began publicly expressing his views on current policies, writing to interim President David G. Burnet to disagree with his decision to return captured Mexican General Santa Anna to Mexico in exchange for his assurances to recognize Texas's independence.

Santa Anna's release to the Mexican government abrogated the Treaty of Velasco. As a result, Hunt was appointed a brigadier general in the Texas Army in August 1836 by President Burnet, with the task of deterring an expected invasion from Mexico. The invasion never materialized and Hunt resigned his commission. The next year, President Sam Houston appointed Hunt as Texas's agent in the United States to assist the diplomat William H. Wharton in securing the United States' recognition of Texas. In March 1837, after successfully concluding that mission, Hunt became the Texan minister in Washington, DC. His proposal for the annexation of Texas in 1837 was rejected by the United States, but he succeeded in negotiating a boundary convention in 1838.

Under Texas's second president, Mirabeau B. Lamar, Hunt was Texas secretary of the Navy from December 1838 to May 1839, when he became the Texas's representative on the joint United States-Texas boundary commission. In 1841, he was a candidate for vice president, running as David G. Burnet's running mate against Sam Houston.

== After statehood and final years ==
Hunt volunteered to serve in the Mexican War in 1846 on General J. Pinckney Henderson's staff. Hunt married Anne Taliaferro Howard of Galveston on Feb. 14, 1850, in Galveston, Galveston Co., Texas. After Texas's annexation by the United States, Hunt was elected for one term to the legislature, in 1852, and in 1853, he was appointed United States commissioner to adjust the southwestern boundary with Mexico. He spent his last years trying to recoup his fortune, which he had sacrificed in the cause of Texas. The legislature granted him full compensation in land. To develop his holdings, he promoted a railroad from Galveston Bay to the Red River. While he was thus engaged, his health failed, and he died at his brother's home in Tipton County, Tennessee, on June 5, 1856. Mrs. Hunt died in 1916 and is buried in the Montgomery New Cemetery located in Montgomery, Montgomery Co., Texas. On 28 July 1859, in Galveston Co., Anne married to Abner S. Lipscomb, who died in 1873. On 18 June 1874, in Montgomery Co., Anne married Abner Womack, who died in 1875. On 20 Nov 1880, in Montgomery Co, Anne married Emmett Jones, who died in 1894.

== Legacy ==
Memucan Hunt Jr. is the namesake of Hunt County, Texas.

Diplomatic posts
Preceded by William H. Wharton (Commissioner seeking Recognition)	Texas Minister to the United States; 1837–1838	Succeeded by Anson Jones
Political offices
Preceded by William M. Shepherd	Secretary of the Navy of the Republic of Texas; 13 December 1838 – May 1839	Succeeded by Louis P. Cooke
Preceded by unknown	Member of the Texas House of Representatives from District 4 (San Augustine); 1851–1853	Succeeded by unknown
