= Potter County, Texas =

County in Texas, United States

- County
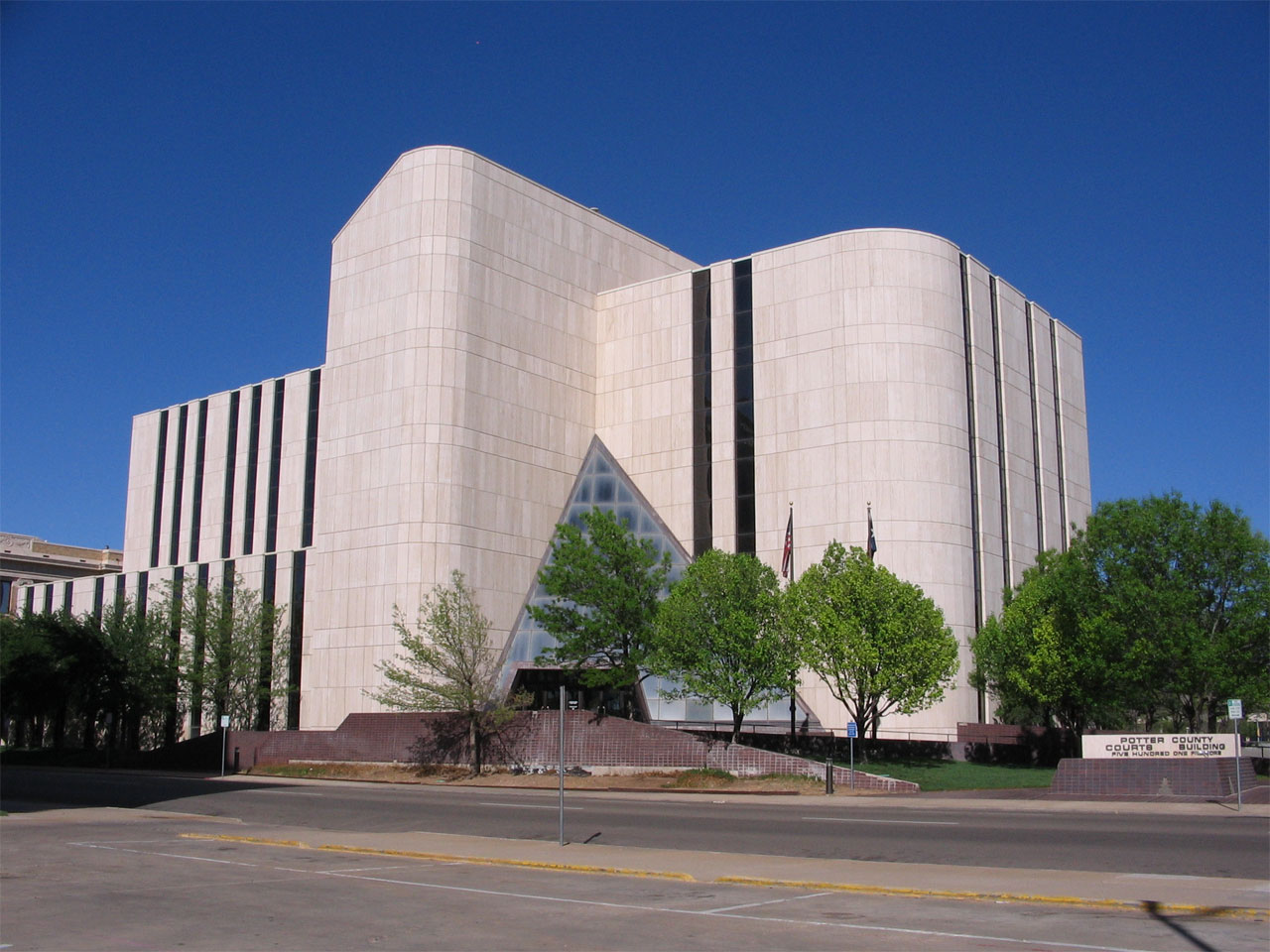
- Potter County District Courts Building in downtown Amarillo

- Seal

- Location within the U.S. state of Texas
- Coordinates: 35°24′N 101°53′W
- Country: United States
- State: Texas
- Founded: 1887
- Named for: Robert Potter
- Seat: Amarillo
- Largest city: Amarillo

Area
  - Total: 922 sq mi (2,390 km^{2})
  - Land: 908 sq mi (2,350 km^{2})
  - Water: 14 sq mi (36 km^{2}) 1.5%

Population (2020)
  - Total: 118,525
  - Estimate (2025): 114,453 ▼
  - Density: 130/sq mi (50/km^{2})
- Time zone: UTC−6 (Central)
  - Summer (DST): UTC−5 (CDT)
- Congressional district: 13th
- Website: www.co.potter.tx.us

Potter County is a county located in the U.S. state of Texas. As of the 2020 census, its population was 118,525. Its county seat is Amarillo. The county was created in 1876 and organized in 1887. It is named for Robert Potter, a politician and signer of the Texas Declaration of Independence and the Texas Secretary of the Navy. Potter County is included in the Amarillo metropolitan area.

== History ==
=== LX Ranch ===
The LX Ranch was established in the county by W.H. "Deacon" Bates and David T. Beals by 1877. In July 1876, Bates, along with some cowboys, who included Charlie Siringo, established a herd of steers and ranch headquarters along Ranch Creek on the north bank of the Canadian River. The headquarters eventually included a bunkhouse, kitchen, storeroom, stables, corrals, blacksmith shop, wagon sheds, and a post office named Wheeler. The LX also established the county's first cemetery. The ranch eventually extended from Dumas to the Palo Duro Canyon and 35 miles east to west. By 1884, the ranch encompassed 187,000 acres, 45,000 cattle, and 1000 horses, when the operation was sold to the American Pastoral Company. In 1902, the ranch headquarters were moved to Bonita Creek, on the south bank of the Canadian River. On October 6, 1910, that company sold 30,354 acres south of the river to Lee Bivins, and on June 1, 1911, R.B. "Ben" Masterson acquired 89,139 acres on the north side. On May 19, 1915, Bivins bought an additional 53,329 LX acres, which included the LX brand.

== Geography ==
According to the U.S. Census Bureau, the county has a total area of 922 square miles (2,390 km^{2}), of which 14 square miles (36 km^{2}) (1.5%) are covered by water.

=== Major highways ===
- I-27
- I-40
  - I-40 BL (Amarillo)
- US 60
- US 87
- US 287
- SH 136
- Loop 279
- Loop 335
- Loop 362
- Loop 395
- Loop 434
- Spur 228
- Spur 468
- Spur 591

=== Adjacent counties ===
- Moore County (north)
- Hutchinson County (northeast)
- Carson County (east)
- Armstrong County (southeast)
- Randall County (south)
- Deaf Smith County (southwest)
- Oldham County (west)
- Hartley County (northwest)

=== National protected areas ===
- Alibates Flint Quarries National Monument
- Lake Meredith National Recreation Area (part)

== Demographics ==
Historical population
Census	Pop.	Note	%±
1880	28		—
1890	849		2,932.1%
1900	1,820		114.4%
1910	12,424		582.6%
1920	16,710		34.5%
1930	46,080		175.8%
1940	54,265		17.8%
1950	73,366		35.2%
1960	115,580		57.5%
1970	90,511		−21.7%
1980	98,637		9.0%
1990	97,874		−0.8%
2000	113,546		16.0%
2010	121,073		6.6%
2020	118,525		−2.1%
2025 (est.)	114,453	▼	−3.4%
U.S. Decennial Census; 1850–1900 1910; 1920 1930 1940 1950 1960 1970 1980 1990 2000; 2010 2020

=== Racial and ethnic composition ===
Potter County, Texas – Racial and ethnic composition Note: the US Census treats Hispanic/Latino as an ethnic category. This table excludes Latinos from the racial categories and assigns them to a separate category. Hispanics/Latinos may be of any race.
Race / Ethnicity (NH = Non-Hispanic)	Pop 2000	Pop 2010	Pop 2020	% 2000	% 2010	% 2020
White alone (NH)	65,470	59,322	50,153	57.66%	49.00%	42.31%
Black or African American alone (NH)	11,047	11,823	11,999	9.73%	9.77%	10.12%
Native American or Alaska Native alone (NH)	682	602	636	0.60%	0.50%	0.54%
Asian alone (NH)	2,768	4,675	6,036	2.44%	3.86%	5.09%
Pacific Islander alone (NH)	27	43	20	0.02%	0.04%	0.02%
Other race alone (NH)	86	155	613	0.08%	0.13%	0.52%
Mixed race or Multiracial (NH)	1,545	1,761	3,875	1.36%	1.45%	3.27%
Hispanic or Latino (any race)	31,921	42,692	45,193	28.11%	32.56%	38.13%
Total	113,546	121,073	118,525	100.00%	100.00%	100.00%

=== 2020 census ===
As of the 2020 census, the county had a population of 118,525. The median age was 36.6 years, 25.2% of residents were under the age of 18, and 14.5% of residents were 65 years of age or older. For every 100 females there were 104.9 males, and for every 100 females age 18 and over there were 105.4 males age 18 and over.

The racial makeup of the county was 52.1% White, 10.6% Black or African American, 1.2% American Indian and Alaska Native, 5.2% Asian, <0.1% Native Hawaiian and Pacific Islander, 14.4% from some other race, and 16.5% from two or more races. Hispanic or Latino residents of any race comprised 38.1% of the population.

88.7% of residents lived in urban areas, while 11.3% lived in rural areas.

There were 42,756 households in the county, of which 33.9% had children under the age of 18 living in them. Of all households, 41.3% were married-couple households, 21.5% were households with a male householder and no spouse or partner present, and 30.1% were households with a female householder and no spouse or partner present. About 29.1% of all households were made up of individuals and 11.4% had someone living alone who was 65 years of age or older.

There were 48,692 housing units, of which 12.2% were vacant. Among occupied housing units, 56.6% were owner-occupied and 43.4% were renter-occupied. The homeowner vacancy rate was 1.9% and the rental vacancy rate was 13.2%.

=== 2000 census ===
As of the 2000 census, 113,546 people, 40,760 households, and 27,472 families were residing in the county. The population density was 125 people per square mile (48 people/km^{2}). The 44,598 housing units had an average density of 49 units per square mile (19 units/km^{2}). The racial makeup of the county was 68.60% White, 9.96% African American, 0.87% Native American, 2.49% Asian, 15.48% from other races, and 2.60% from two or more races. About 28.11% of the population were Hispanics or Latinos of any race.

Of the 40,760 households, 34.7% had children under 18 living with them, 47.4% were married couples living together, 15.0% had a female householder with no husband present, and 32.6% were not families. About 27.6% of all households were made up of individuals, and 10.1% had someone living alone who was 65 or older. The average household size was 2.61, and the average family size was 3.21.

In the county, the age distribution was 28.0% under 18, 11.1% from 18 to 24, 30.1% from 25 to 44, 19.1% from 45 to 64, and 11.7% who were 65 or older. The median age was 32 years. For every 100 females, there were 100.90 males. For every 100 females 18 and over, there were 100.20 males.

The median income for a household in the county was $29,492, and for a family was $35,321. Males had a median income of $26,123 versus $20,275 for females. The per capita income for the county was $14,947. About 15.2% of families and 19.2% of the population were below the poverty line, including 25.3% of those under 18 and 12.3% of those 65 or over.

== Government and infrastructure ==
The Texas Department of Criminal Justice Clements Unit and Neal Unit are located in unincorporated Potter County, east of the City of Amarillo.

== Politics ==
Potter County is strongly conservative for an urban county. It has supported Republican presidential candidates in every election since 1968 and all but once since 1952, usually by lopsided margins. Indeed, Jimmy Carter is the last Democrat to reach 40 percent of the vote, and one of only three to do so since Harry Truman. In every election since 1996, the county has given the Republican candidate over two-thirds of its vote.

However, as the county's population has increased, so too has the percentage of Democratic voters. According to the 2020 Election, it is the most Democratic-leaning county in the Texas Panhandle. In 2004, George W. Bush received 21,401 votes (74% of the total) in the county to just 7,489 votes (25%) for his opponent, John Kerry. In 2020, Donald Trump received 22,820 votes (69%) in the county as opposed to Joe Biden, who received 9,921 votes (30%). In 2024, Donald Trump received the highest percentage of the vote (over 71%) in the county since Texas native son George W. Bush in 2004.

Potter County is located within District 87 of the Texas House of Representatives. Potter County is located within District 31 of the Texas Senate.

United States presidential election results for Potter County, Texas
Year	Republican		Democratic		Third party(ies)	
Year	No.	%	No.	%	No.	%
1912	41	3.86%	801	75.42%	220	20.72%
1916	166	10.65%	1,288	82.62%	105	6.74%
1920	358	20.21%	1,374	77.58%	39	2.20%
1924	831	21.81%	2,394	62.82%	586	15.38%
1928	3,627	57.90%	2,637	42.10%	0	0.00%
1932	1,233	16.13%	6,366	83.29%	44	0.58%
1936	1,018	13.32%	6,496	84.99%	129	1.69%
1940	2,285	24.02%	7,203	75.71%	26	0.27%
1944	2,759	27.36%	6,519	64.65%	806	7.99%
1948	4,110	28.90%	9,622	67.66%	490	3.45%
1952	14,931	61.62%	9,259	38.21%	42	0.17%
1956	11,943	57.66%	8,720	42.10%	49	0.24%
1960	14,202	61.14%	8,989	38.70%	38	0.16%
1964	11,505	47.11%	12,850	52.62%	64	0.26%
1968	13,338	49.27%	8,238	30.43%	5,496	20.30%
1972	18,891	74.56%	6,264	24.72%	180	0.71%
1976	13,819	53.08%	11,917	45.77%	300	1.15%
1980	16,327	60.85%	9,633	35.90%	871	3.25%
1984	20,396	70.57%	8,365	28.94%	141	0.49%
1988	16,400	62.76%	9,563	36.60%	168	0.64%
1992	13,510	48.64%	9,527	34.30%	4,738	17.06%
1996	14,995	57.13%	9,273	35.33%	1,977	7.53%
2000	17,629	69.47%	7,242	28.54%	505	1.99%
2004	21,401	73.65%	7,489	25.77%	166	0.57%
2008	20,761	69.17%	8,939	29.78%	313	1.04%
2012	18,918	71.52%	7,126	26.94%	406	1.53%
2016	19,630	68.09%	7,657	26.56%	1,544	5.36%
2020	22,820	68.45%	9,921	29.76%	596	1.79%
2024	23,007	71.63%	8,748	27.23%	366	1.14%

United States Senate election results for Potter County, Texas1
Year	Republican		Democratic		Third party(ies)	
Year	No.	%	No.	%	No.	%
2024	22,109	69.33%	8,933	28.01%	848	2.66%

United States Senate election results for Potter County, Texas2
Year	Republican		Democratic		Third party(ies)	
Year	No.	%	No.	%	No.	%
2020	22,683	69.08%	9,168	27.92%	985	3.00%

Texas Gubernatorial election results for Potter County
Year	Republican		Democratic		Third party(ies)	
Year	No.	%	No.	%	No.	%
2022	16,082	73.75%	5,361	24.58%	363	1.66%

== Communities ==
=== Cities ===
- Amarillo (county seat) (partly in Randall County)

=== Towns ===
- Bishop Hills

=== Census-designated places ===
- Bushland (shared with Randall County)

=== Unincorporated communities ===
- Ady
- Cliffside
- Gentry
- St. Francis

=== Historical communities ===
- Folsom
- Pleasant Valley
- Pullman
- Soncy

== Education ==
School districts include:

- Amarillo Independent School District
- Bushland Independent School District
- Highland Park Independent School District
- River Road Independent School District

All of the county is in the service area of Amarillo College.

== See also ==
- List of museums in the Texas Panhandle
- National Register of Historic Places listings in Potter County, Texas
- Recorded Texas Historic Landmarks in Potter County
