= Action of April 17, 1837 =

1837 Naval battle between Mexico and the Republic of Texas

Battle of the Brazos River
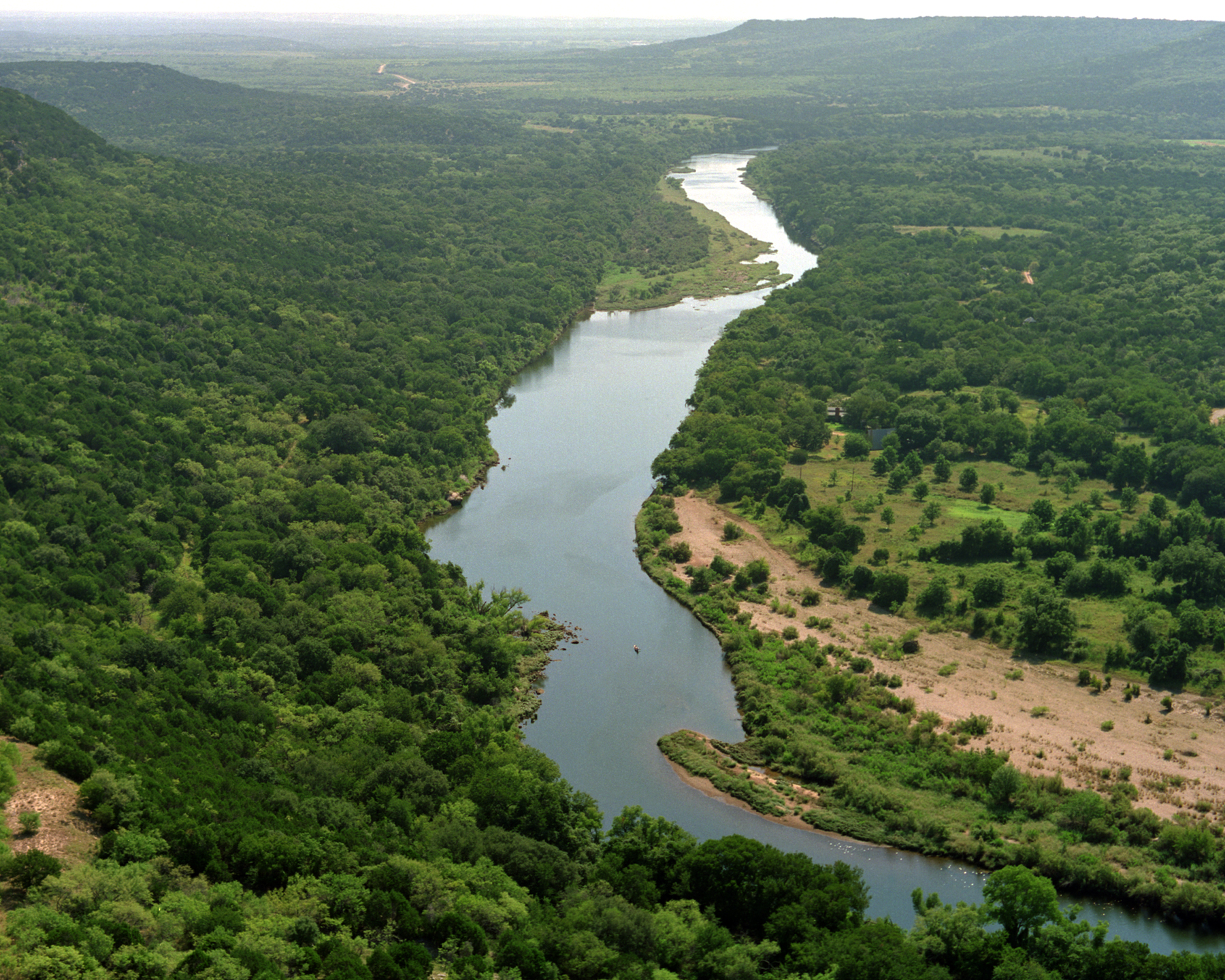
- Independence and the two Mexican brigs firing at long range.
Date	April 17, 1837
Location	Brazos River, off Velasco, Texas 28°57′28.9″N 95°21′46.0″W
Result	Mexican victory

Belligerents
Mexico	Republic of Texas

Commanders and leaders
(Mexico) Francisco López	(Republic of Texas) George Wheelwright (POW)

Strength
2 brigs	1 schooner

Casualties and losses
2 killed 2 brigs damaged	1 wounded 1 schooner captured

The Battle of the Brazos River was an engagement fought in the Brazos River on April 17, 1837, between the Mexican Navy and the Texian Navy.

== Background ==
Despite Houston's victory over Santa Anna's army at San Jacinto, Texans continued to fight a naval war in hopes of persuading the Mexican Government to agree to the independence of Texas. In March 1837, Texas Navy ship Independence prepared for another cruise to take United States diplomat William H. Wharton to Texas from New Orleans. Independence had smooth sailing for about seven days when on April 17 she encountered the Mexican brigs Vencedor del Álamo under Francisco López and the Libertador, off the mouth of the Brazos River.

== Battle ==
The initial sighting of the two Mexican brigs was at about 5:30 am. Outgunned and outmanned Independence fled up Brazos River for protection at the small riverside town of Velasco. The Mexican vessels pursued the Texans, eventually the two brigs came within cannons range several hours later at 9:30 am. Vencedor del Alamo of sixteen 8-pounder guns and 140 men, sailed with Libertador of 100 men, six 12-pounder guns and one 18-pounder. Independence of eight guns total, raised her colors followed by Libertador which then fired the first broadside that had no effect. Shortly afterward Independence fired a broadside with her weather battery of one 9-pounder gun, three 6-pounder guns, and one pivot gun. For two hours, Independence continued up Brazos River with the Mexican brigs in close pursuit, occasionally stopping to fire on each other. By 11:30 am the Texans had reached Velasco, Captain Wheelwright had no choice but to fight to the end, apparently not being able to continue up Brazos River any further. The final engagement took place right in front of the small Texan town and populace, including Texan Secretary of the Navy Samuel Rhoads Fisher.

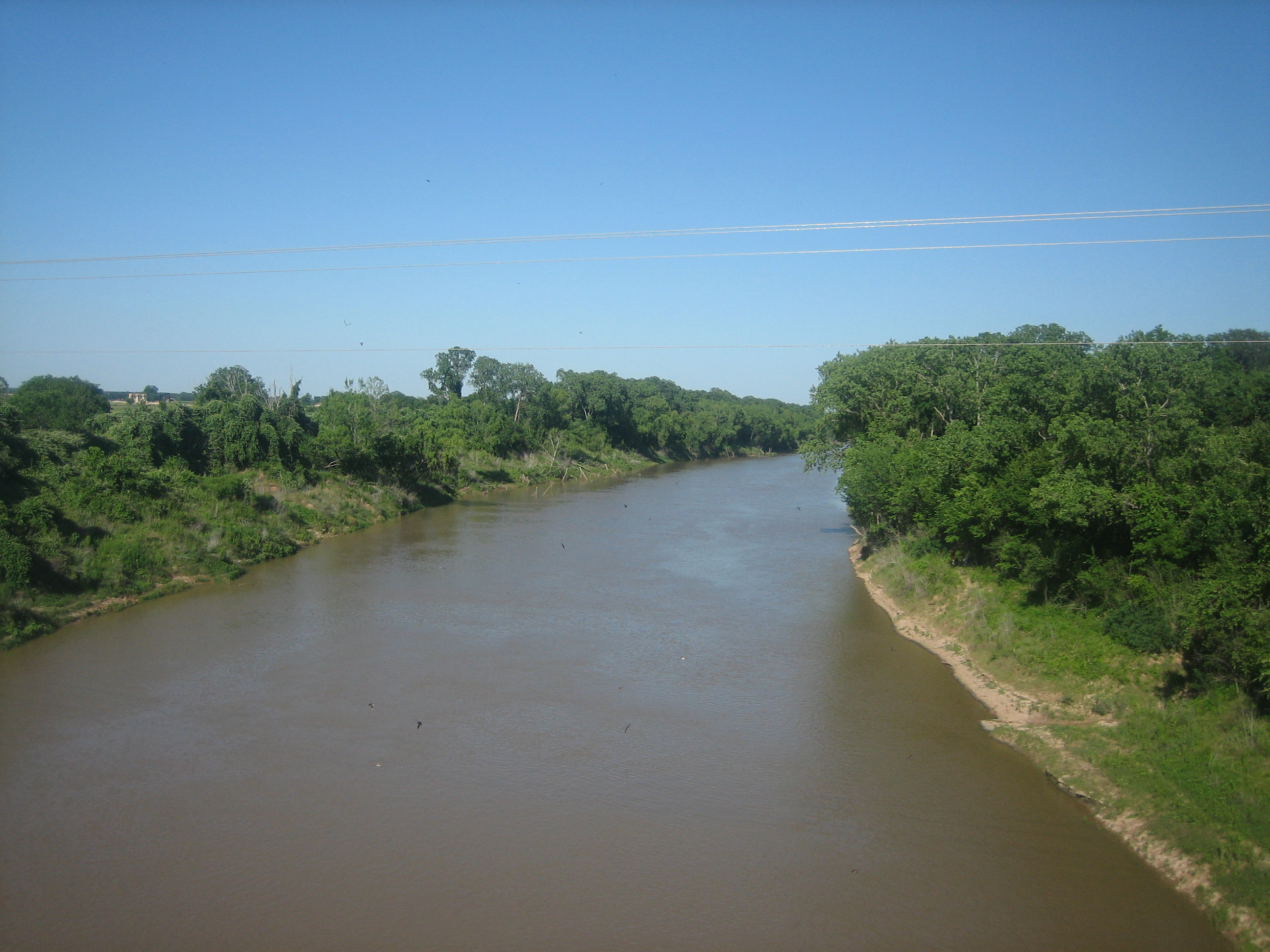
Brazos River

The Mexicans not being far behind came within range and Captain Wheelwright ordered his men to engage once more. The shots managed to damage the main top-gallant mast of the Libertador and after another broadside in Libertador's direction, two Mexicans lay dead and a few more were wounded. More shots damaged Libertador' foremast and knocked out one of her 12-pounders. However, these broadsides did not slow the Mexican ships, Libertador approached Independence head on while Vincedor del Alamo maneuvered around to Independence's other side. The two brigs quickly came within pistol shots range and both fired a mixture of cannon projectiles. This is when a ball smashed through Independence' quarter gallery wall and into the Texan captain, taking off three of his fingers on his right hand. Severely wounded and taken below, command of the schooner passed to Lieutenant John W. Taylor who finished the last few moments of battle before receiving orders from Wheelwright to surrender. With this action the battle was over.

== Aftermath ==
Immediately Independence was boarded, the officers and crew, as well as William Wharton and a half dozen other civilian passengers, were taken prisoner. The Texan fightingmen were barred away in Matamoros, but all of the prisoners eventually escaped or were released by the Mexican government. That same day, Mexican president Anastasio Bustamante, in his inaugural address, pledged to reorganize his military to "preserve the rights of the nation," which includes the reconquest of Texas. After the capture of the Independence, the Mexican seamen found a long-lost 8-pounder gun, which had been captured by the Texans at the Battle of San Jacinto a year earlier. Independence was commissioned into the Mexican Navy's Veracruz Squadron under the name La Independencia and continued to serve in the Gulf of Mexico against the Texans.
