= River Road Independent School District =

School district in Texas

Coordinates: 35.3078°N 101.8332°W

Location
- 9500 US Highway 287 North, Amarillo, Texas, 79108 ESC Region 16 United States of America

District information
- Type: Public
- Motto: "The Right Road For The Right Reason"
- Grades: PK - 12
- Superintendent: Richard Kelly

Students and staff
- Students: 1,340
- Athletic conference: AAA
- District mascot: The Wildcats and Ladycats
- Colors

Other information
- TEA District Accountability Rating for 2009: Academically acceptable
- Website: rrisd.net

River Road Independent School District is a public school district based in rural north central Potter County, Texas (USA). The district serves parts of Amarillo north of Loop 335.

The boundary for the school district is roughly Loop 335 to the south, West Amarillo Creek to the west, the Canadian River to the north, and SH 136 to the east.

== Extracurricular activities ==
River Road ISD offers football, basketball, volleyball, baseball, softball, cross country, track, and golf. The mascot for the athletic teams is the Wildcat. River Road High School is classified as a 3A school by the University Interscholastic League (UIL). In addition to athletics, the school district offers band, theatre, and art. Clubs sponsored by the school includes NHS, FFA, Spanish Club, Book Club, Cosmetology, Welding, Student Council, Prom Committee, Certified Nursing Assistant, and EMT programs.

== Academics ==
As of 2026, the River Road Independent School District was rated an overall “B” by the Texas Education Agency.

== Administration ==
The school district is led by a superintendent along with an assistant superintendent. Additionally, River Road ISD has a board of trustees made up of volunteers that are elected by community members.

== Schools ==
- River Road High School (Grades 9–12)
- River Road Middle School (Grades 6–8)
- Rolling Hills Elementary School (Grades 2–5)
- Willow Vista Early Childhood Academy (PK-1)
