= Cliffside, Texas =

- Unincorporated community
- Location within Texas Location within the United States
- Coordinates: 35°15′54″N 101°55′58″W
- Country: United States
- State: Texas
- County: Potter
- Elevation: 3,416 ft (1,041 m)

Population (2000)
  - Total: 206
- Time zone: UTC-6 (Central (CST))
  - Summer (DST): UTC-5 (CDT)
- GNIS feature ID: 1354664

Cliffside is an unincorporated community in Potter County, located in the U.S. state of Texas.

== History ==
Prior to the community's existence, the Fort Worth and Denver Railway opened a station here in 1888. The first schoolhouse opened in 1905, with the town being platted out on August 5, 1915. From 1908 to 1917, a Post Office operated out of a general store, but was discontinued due to its proximity to Amarillo. By 1980, Cliffside only had a few small red buildings besides the railroad track. From the 1960s through 2000, the population estimates were recorded at 206.
