= Gentry, Texas =

- Unincorporated community
- Location within Texas Location within the United States
- Coordinates: 35°17′46″N 101°59′33″W
- Country: United States
- State: Texas
- County: Potter
- Elevation: 3,471 ft (1,058 m)
- Time zone: UTC-6 (Central (CST))
  - Summer (DST): UTC-5 (CDT)
- GNIS feature ID: 1379830

Gentry is an unincorporated community in Potter County, located in the U.S. state of Texas.
