= Folsom, Texas =

- Historical unincorporated community
- Location within Texas Location within the United States
- Coordinates: 35°14′09″N 101°42′21″W
- Country: United States
- State: Texas
- County: Potter
- Elevation: 3,583 ft (1,092 m)
- Time zone: UTC-6 (Central (CST))
  - Summer (DST): UTC-5 (CDT)
- GNIS feature ID: 1379783

Folsom was an unincorporated community in Potter County, located in the U.S. state of Texas. The area is now within the city limits of Amarillo.
