= Micajah T. Hawkins =

American politician

Micajah Thomas Hawkins (May 20, 1790 – December 22, 1858) was an American farmer and politician who served five terms as a U.S. Congressman from North Carolina from 1831 to 1841.

== Biography ==
Born near Warrenton, North Carolina in 1790, Hawkins attended Warrenton Academy and then the University of North Carolina at Chapel Hill.

A practicing farmer, Hawkins was first elected to the North Carolina House of Commons in 1819, serving again in 1820. From 1823 to 1827 he was a member of the North Carolina State Senate, and also served in the North Carolina Militia, reaching the rank of major general.

=== Congress ===
Hawkins was elected to the 22nd United States Congress as a Jacksonian (later Democrat) in a special election to fill the vacancy left by the resignation of Robert Potter. He was re-elected to four terms in Congress, serving from December 15, 1831, to March 3, 1841. He declined to run again in 1840 and returned to farming in North Carolina.

=== Later career and death ===
After serving in Congress, Hawkins became involved again in North Carolina politics, serving in the state Senate in 1846 and as a member of the North Carolina Council of State from 1854 to 1855.

He died and was buried near Warrenton in 1858.

== Family ==
Hawkins was the nephew of Benjamin Hawkins and of Nathaniel Macon.

U.S. House of Representatives
Preceded by Robert Potter	Member of the U.S. House of Representatives from North Carolina's 6th congressional district 1831–1841	Succeeded by Archibald H. Arrington
