= Alfred Douglas Price =

American businessman, community leader (1860–1921)

- Born: August 9, 1860; Ashland, Hanover County, Virginia, U.S.
- Died: April 9, 1921 (aged 60); Richmond, Virginia, U.S.
- Other name: A. D. Price
- Occupations: Businessperson, community leader
- Known for: 19th-century African American community leadership

Alfred Douglas Price, Sr. (August 9, 1860 – April 9, 1921) also known as A. D. Price, was an American businessman and community leader in the late 19th-century and early 20th-century in Richmond, Virginia. He owned a blacksmith shop, funeral home, and a livery. Price was one of the largest African American real estate owners in his city, and the A.D. Price Funeral Home is now a national historic site.

== Early life ==
Price was born on August 9, 1860, in Ashland, Hanover County, Virginia. Historical marker SA-58 in Richmond states that he was enslaved at birth, however that claim has not been supported with reliable documentation.

Price attended public school for only a few years before leaving home at age seven to work in Richmond. He soon returned to his hometown to work with his mother in their store. He was apprenticed as a blacksmith from 1874 to 1877.

== Career ==
By 1881, Price was able to open his own blacksmith and wheelwright shop. In 1886, he added the skills of livery and undertaking to his business. During the late 18th-century in the United States, it was not uncommon for businesses to offer multiple services, and undertaking was done by many different types of tradesmen.

Many African Americans did not have personal transportation during this time, and Price's livery service was able to fulfill that need with horse carriages. He also had a wagon delivery service for local businesses. In August of 1894, Price became one of the first funeral directors in the state to receive an embalming license.

In 1898, Price's business had around 40 horses and the largest amount of funeral carriages and funeral equipment in the city of Richmond. According to Richmond Planet, the group of African American funeral directors in the city owned more carriages than the white undertakers combined. By the early 1900s, Price was also holding funerals for prominent white people, which enhanced his societal power.

=== A.D. Price Funeral Home ===
The A.D. Price Funeral Home was located in Jackson Ward at 208 East Leigh Street in Richmond.

A historical marker outside the building now commemorates its history. The funeral home was featured on a postcard, which is part of the Tichnor Brothers Postcard Collection at the Boston Public Library.

A mortician bought the building in 2008. In 2010, the main building was converted into 14 apartments. In March of 2022, a five-story apartment building was approved to be built in the funeral home's parking lot. The new building will have 63 apartments, as well as a clubroom and rooftop deck.

== Death and legacy ==
Price had a growth on his foot and he decided to remove it surgically by himself, which led to an infection and a team of doctors removing his foot in attempts to save his life. He died on April 9, 1921.

Price was one of the largest African American real estate holders in Richmond. He was able to place his owned buildings and associated businesses in close proximity to each other as a cost-saving method. This also fostered community, especially in the African American population of Richmond.

Price served on the board of directors of a number of organizations; he was a director of banks that served African Americans, and he was president of the Southern Aid Society of Virginia insurance company from 1905 until 1921. He was also active in numerous fraternal and business organizations.

Price served as a mentor for the younger Robert Crafton Scott, Sr. (1888–1957), another prominent African American businessperson in Richmond.

One of A. D. Price's hearses was part of The Story of Virginia exhibition, which opened in 2015, at the Virginia Museum of History & Culture. He also owned a 1918 Kline Kar, manufactured in Richmond, which has survived and been restored by White Post Restorations. The Kline Kar is now on display in the center of the VMHC’s new Commonwealth Hall, and was also featured on the official Virginia History Christmas ornament for 2022.
