= Kline Kar =

Defunct American motor vehicle manufacturer

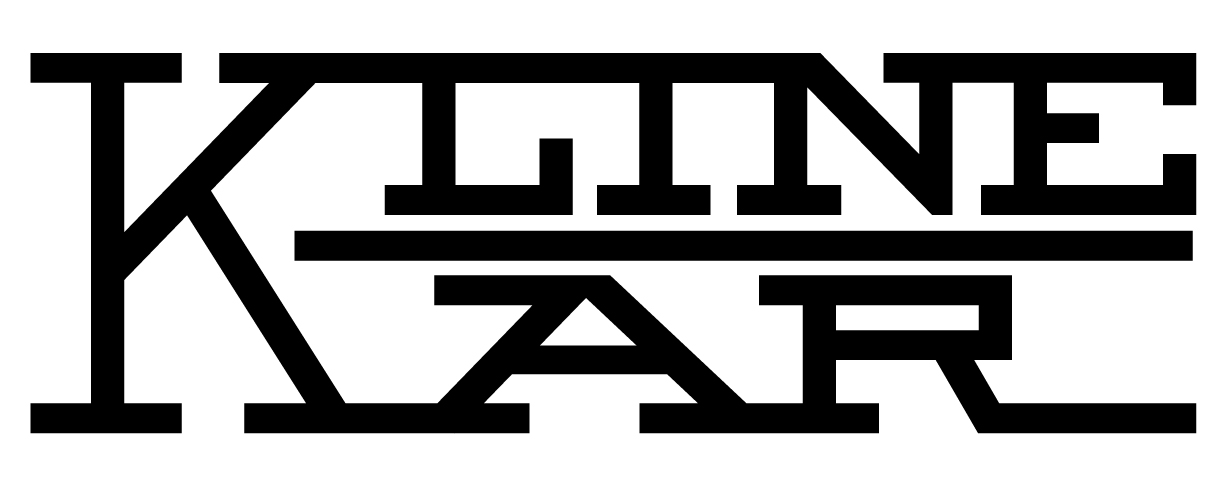

Overview
- Manufacturer: B.C.K. Motor Company, Kline Motor Car Corp.
- Model years: 1910–1924
- Designer: James A. Kline

Chronology
- Predecessor: Pullman automobile

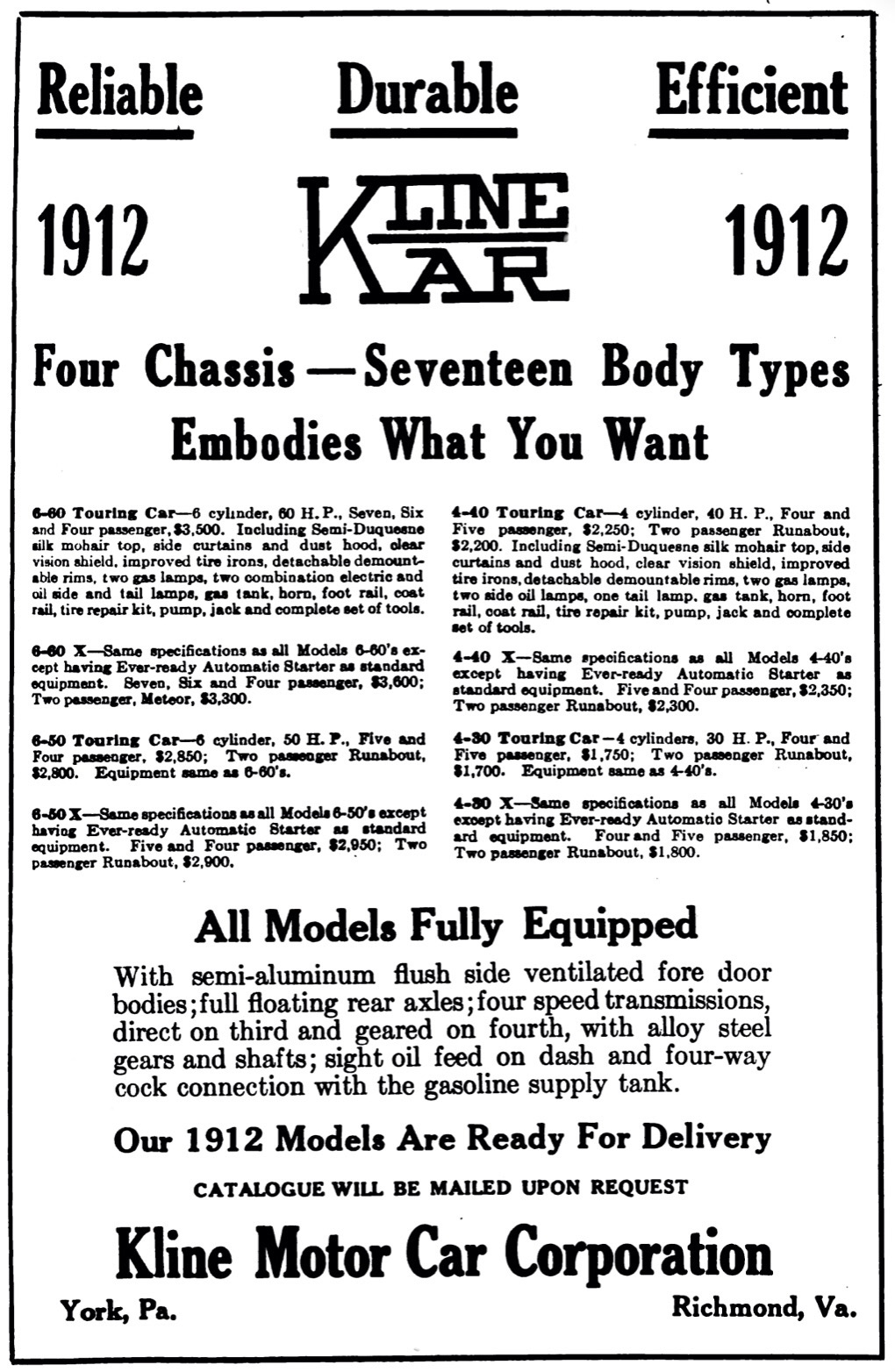
Kline Kar Model 6-60, 6-50, 4-40, 4-30 (1912)

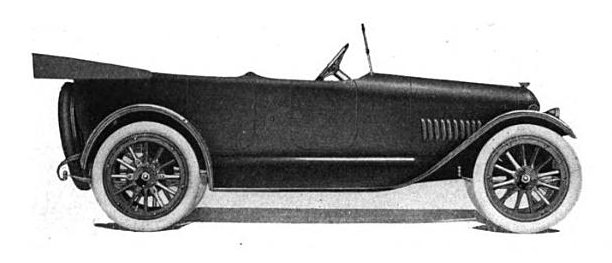
1917 Kline Kar Touring 6-38

The Kline Kar was an American automobile built first in York, Pennsylvania, (1910–1912), and then in Richmond, Virginia, (1912–1923). The car was often just referred to as a Kline.

== History ==
James Allen Kline (1874-1944) moved to York to work on a car that at the time was known as the York, but soon became the Pullman. After leaving that company, he partnered with another former employee, Samuel E. Baily, and with Joseph C. Carrell formed B.C.K. Motor Company. This new firm produced the Kline Kar starting in 1910, in the building owned by Baily for his carriage company.

The new 6-cylinder cars were entered in auto races. There were two dirt track race cars called "Jimmy" and "Jimmy, Jr." after the chief designer and his son. These race cars brought the company nationwide attention.

Richmond, Virginia businessmen noted how well the Kline was selling in their state and moved it to Virginia. In Richmond, they reorganized as the Kline Motor Car Corporation and built a new factory in which to produce the car. This factory was located on the Boulevard, (2910 Arthur Ashe Blvd.). From November 1912, Klines were produced in Richmond, except for the engines brought in from Bath, New York, where the Kirkham Machine Company built them to Kline's design.

The Kline Model 6-50 runabout, which cost $2,585, was advertised as "one of the classiest roadsters brought out for several seasons... for a physician or a young man of fastidious taste."

In 1915, the firm was in receivership, but it survived and two years later was making 1,399 cars in a single year. The Post–World War I recession again weakened the company. The Kline became an assembled car.

From 1920 all Klines came with a 3672cc Continental engine increasing to a 3959cc unit in 1923. Prices at that time ranged from $1,865 to $2,790. The company closed in early 1924, and James Kline said of his beloved Kline Kar, "I would rather see my children dead than prostituted to cheapness and inferior workmanship.

Richmond businessman and undertaker Alfred Douglas Price owned one and it has been restored.
