= Pleasant Valley, Potter County, Texas =

Pleasant Valley, Texas
- Historical unincorporated community
- Location within Texas Location within the United States
- Coordinates: 35°15′29″N 101°49′52″W
- Country: United States
- State: Texas
- County: Potter
- Elevation: 3,511 ft (1,070 m)
- Time zone: UTC-6 (Central (CST))
  - Summer (DST): UTC-5 (CDT)
- GNIS feature ID: 1365449

Pleasant Valley was an unincorporated community in Potter County, located in the U.S. state of Texas. It is now largely within the city limits of Amarillo.
