= St. Francis, Texas =

- Unincorporated community
- Location within Texas Location within the United States
- Coordinates: 35°15′36″N 101°37′37″W
- Country: United States
- State: Texas
- County: Potter
- Elevation: 3,527 ft (1,075 m)
- Time zone: UTC-6 (Central (CST))
  - Summer (DST): UTC-5 (CDT)
- GNIS feature ID: 1380477

St. Francis is an unincorporated community in Potter County, located in the U.S. state of Texas.
