= Pulman =

Pulman is a surname. Notable people with the surname include:

- Cory Pulman (born 1963), English actress now known by her married name Cory Pulman-Jones
- Doug Pulman (1946–2011), New Zealand rower
- Elizabeth Pulman (1836–1900), New Zealand photographer
- Felicity Pulman (born 1945), Australian author
- George Pulman (1819–1880), English journalist
- Jack Pulman (1929–1979), English television screenwriter
- James Pulman (1783–1859), English officer of arms
- James Heard Pulman (1821–1900), House of Lords Librarian
- John Pulman (1923–1998), English professional snooker player
- Liza Pulman, English singer and actress

== Other uses ==
- Pulman Challenge Cup, a Gentlemen's Single Sculls rowing event at the Skiff Championships Regatta on the Thames

== See also ==
- Pullman (disambiguation)
