= Pullman Lake =

Lake in the state of Minnesota, United States

- Location within Minnesota
- Location: Grant County, Minnesota
- Coordinates: 45°48′7″N 96°8′45″W
- Type: lake

Pullman Lake is a lake in Grant County, in the U.S. state of Minnesota.

Pullman Lake was named for Charles Pullman, a local hotel owner.

== See also ==
- List of lakes in Minnesota
