= Pullman automobile =

Defunct American motor vehicle manufacturer

York Motor Car Company Pullman Motor Car Company
- Not Only The Best at the Price, But the Best at Any Price
- Industry: Automotive
- Founded: 1905; 121 years ago
- Founder: Albert P. Broomell, Samuel E. Baily
- Defunct: 1917; 109 years ago
- Fate: Bankruptcy
- Headquarters: York, Pennsylvania, United States
- Key people: Albert P. Broomell, Samuel E. Baily, James A. Kline, E. T. Birdsall
- Products: Automobiles; Automotive parts
- Production output: 23,384 (1905-1917)

The Pullman was an American automobile that was manufactured in York, Pennsylvania by the York Motor Car Company from 1905 to 1909 and the Pullman Motor Car Company from 1909 to 1917.

The Pullman automobile was named by industrialist Albert P. Broomell to reflect the quality and luxury of rail cars and coaches made by the Pullman Company, but the two organizations were not related.

== History ==
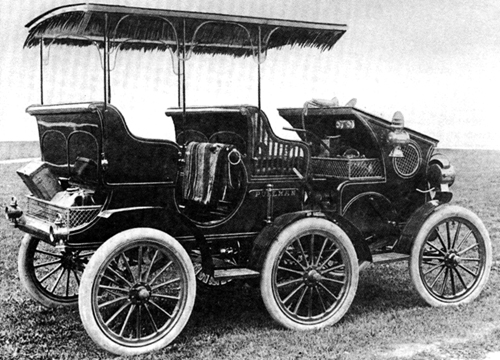
Six-wheeled Pullman Automobile

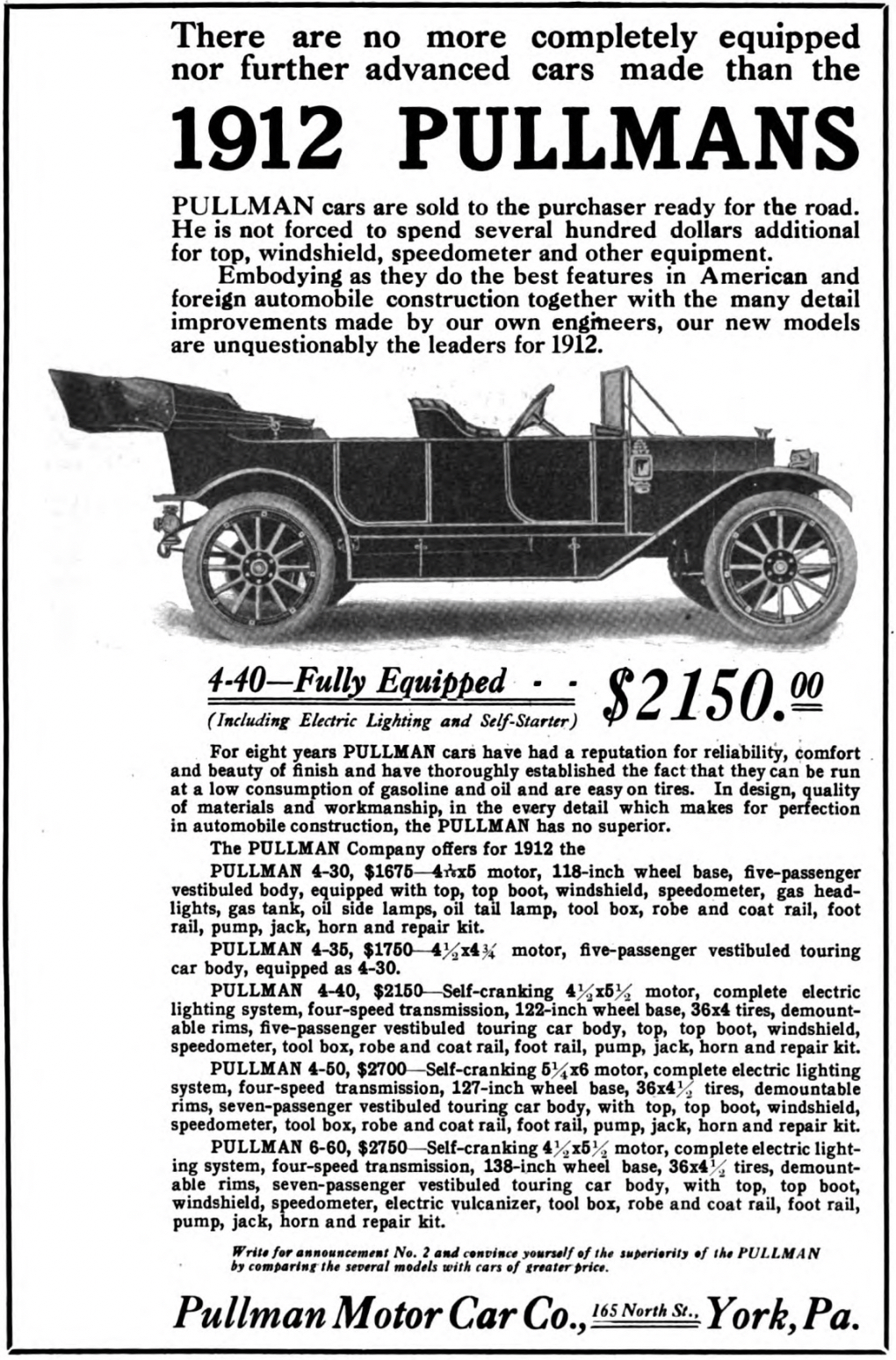
Pullman advertisement (1912)

Pullmann advertisement (1913)

Pullmann 6-48 (1913)

=== Six-wheeled Pullman ===
Albert P. Brumell of Broomell, Schmidt & Steacy Company built his first car in 1903. Named the Pullman, it featured six wheels and was built in the Hardinge factory. The axles were evenly spaced; the endmost two axles were in their conventional fore and aft locations and the middle two wheels, which were the powered wheels, sat directly under the passenger seats.

When steering the front and rear axles would turn in opposition, enabling the car to turn very tightly. If the car passed over a low spot in the road the driving wheels could become suspended and stop the car until it was pushed. When the car reached a particularly high spot in the road, it had a tendency to see-saw. In 1903, this problem contributed to a car crash. The vehicle was subsequently torn apart and items such as the engine were rebuilt in a more conventional four-wheel configuration.

=== Pullman Motor Car ===
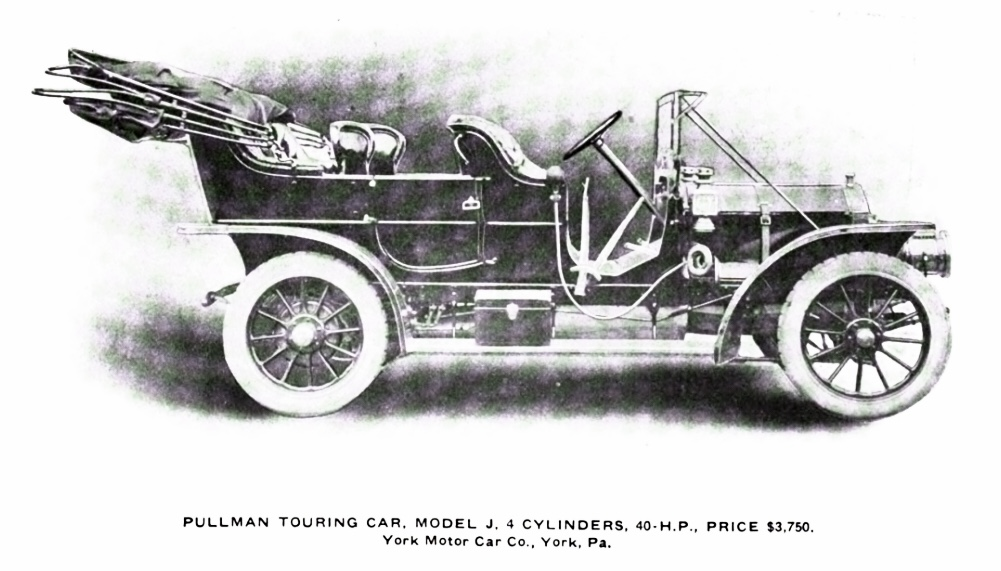
Pullman Model J (1908)

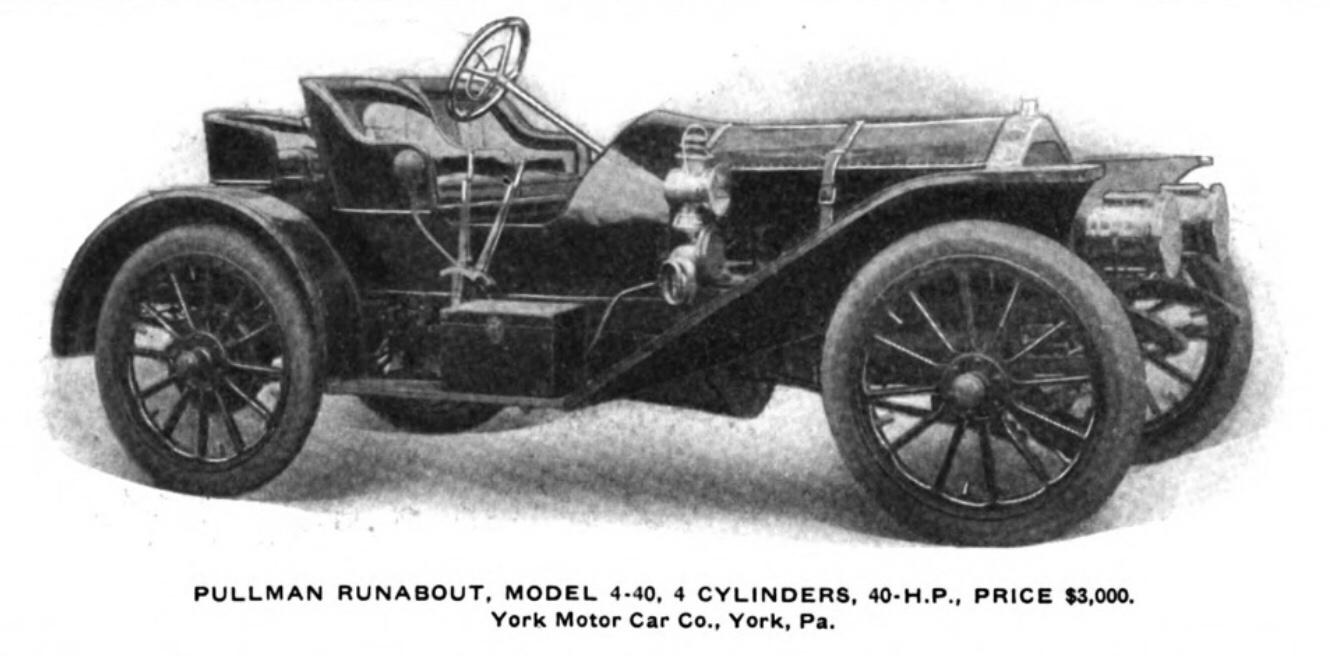
Pullman Model 4-40 (1908-1910)

The revised car was thought to be good enough for production and Brunnell and Samuel E. Baily established the York Motor Car Company in 1905. Also in 1905, master mechanic James A. Kline joined to design an improved car. Originally planned to be called the York, the name Pullman was settled on before the new car went into production. Thirteen York pilot cars were built in 1905, a figure that increased to 273 in 1906, the first full year of production.

Pullman automobiles were sold as premium vehicles, using advertising slogans such as "Not Only The Best at the Price, But the Best at Any Price." The first Pullmans were large Touring and Runabout cars with twenty-hp or forty-hp engines priced from $2,000 to $2,500, equivalent to $89,583 in 2025.

By 1909, annual production exceeded one thousand cars and was then increased in 1910 to more than two thousand.

Due to the Panic of 1907, financial assistance was needed and Thomas O'Connor and Oscar Stephenson of New York City became investors. In 1908, James Kline and Samuel Baily departed the company and would go back into automobile production with the Kline Kar in 1910.

In 1908, one vehicle was driven from the York factory to San Francisco and back over a period of about a month to prove its reliability. The Lincoln Highway which ran through York had not been fully organized or completed and this was a challenging journey.

In 1909, the company was reorganized as the Pullman Motor Car Company.

A Pullman won the famed Fairmount Park Road Race in Philadelphia in 1910, and in 1911 was awarded three gold medals at the Russian Exposition in Rostov on Don, considered an unprecedented "victory" for an American automobile manufacturer.

In 1912, Pullman introduced a sixty-hp six-cylinder car on a 138-inch wheelbase that was priced at $2,750, equivalent to $91,746 in 2025.

Annual production by 1915 was more than four thousand cars. The Cutler-Hammer electric gear change was also offered; however, quality issues resulted from the high production and sales severely declined. In late 1915, E. T. Birdsall was brought in from White Motor Company to design a lower priced car to be called the Pullman Junior, but it was too late to save the company. The Pullman Junior, with a twenty-two-hp Golden Belknap & Schwartz engine that was priced at $740, (equivalent to $21,894 in 2025) was introduced for 1916 and was the only car produced in 1917 while the company was under receivership.

=== Fate ===
The Pullman Motor Car Company declared bankruptcy in December 1916 and ceased operations in 1917; the factory was sold to Bell Motor Car Co. (also of York) and the rest of the company's assets were then sold at sale in July of that year, .

The original building which housed the Pullman factory still exists in York, Pennsylvania at 238-242 N George St. There are about 27 known Pullman automobiles still in existence, about half of which have been restored.

== Overview of production figures ==
Year	Production	Model
1905	13	
1906	273	
1907	397	
1908	873	J, 4-40
1909	1.317	4-40
1910	2.114	4-40; Model M 11; Model K 11; Model O 11
1911	2.728	Model M 11; Model K 11; Model O 11
1912	3.138	4-30, 4-35, 4-40, 4-50, 6-60
1913	2.329	4-30, 4-36, 4-44, 4-50, 6-48, 6-60, 6-66
1914	2.117	4-30, 6-60
1915	4.136	
1916	2.736	
1917	1.213	
Sum	23.384	

== Gallery ==
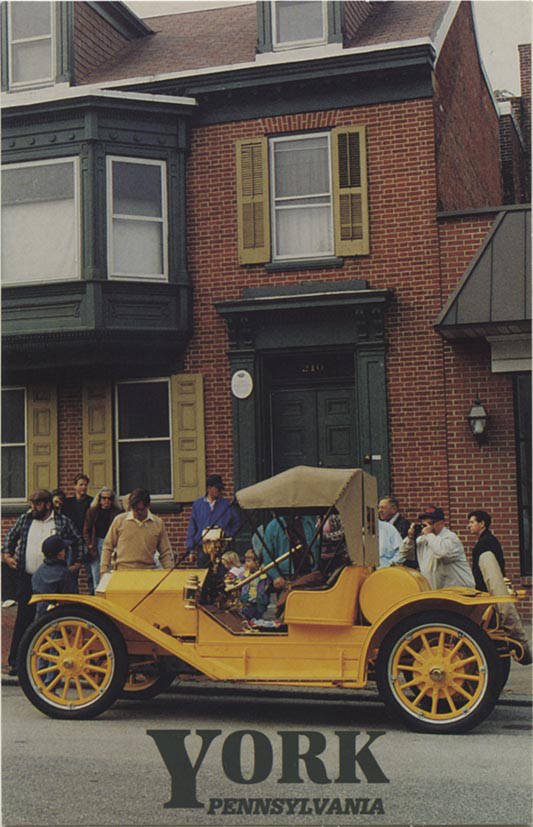
1910 Model O Pullman Raceabout

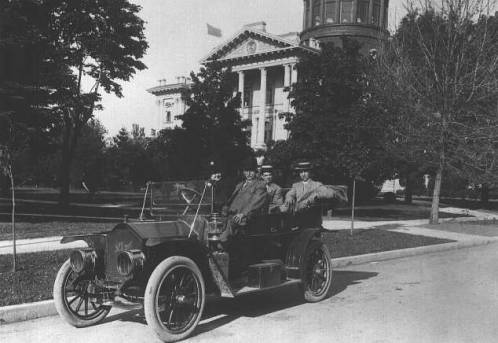
1910 Pullman Touring car

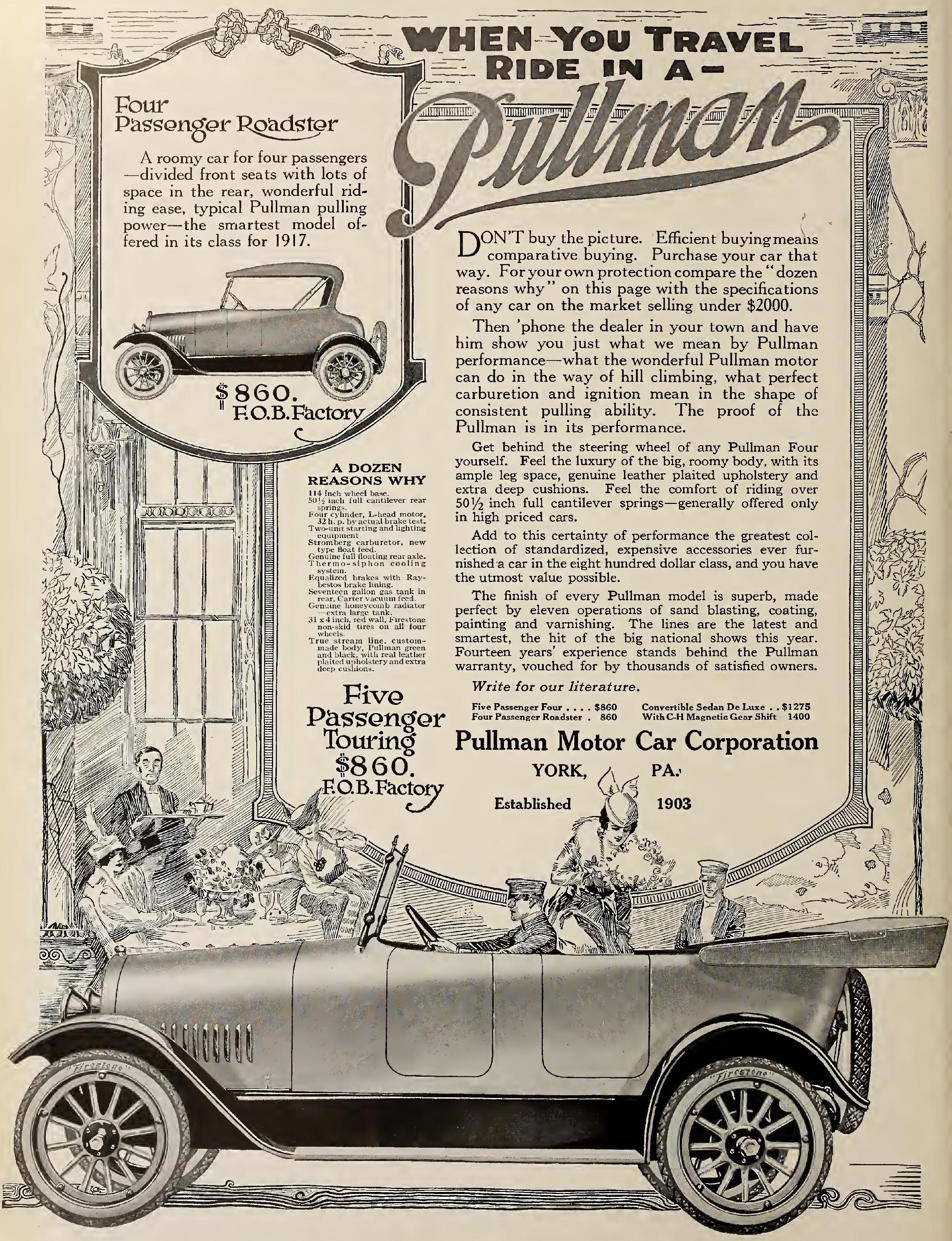
1917 Pullman Motor Car advertisement

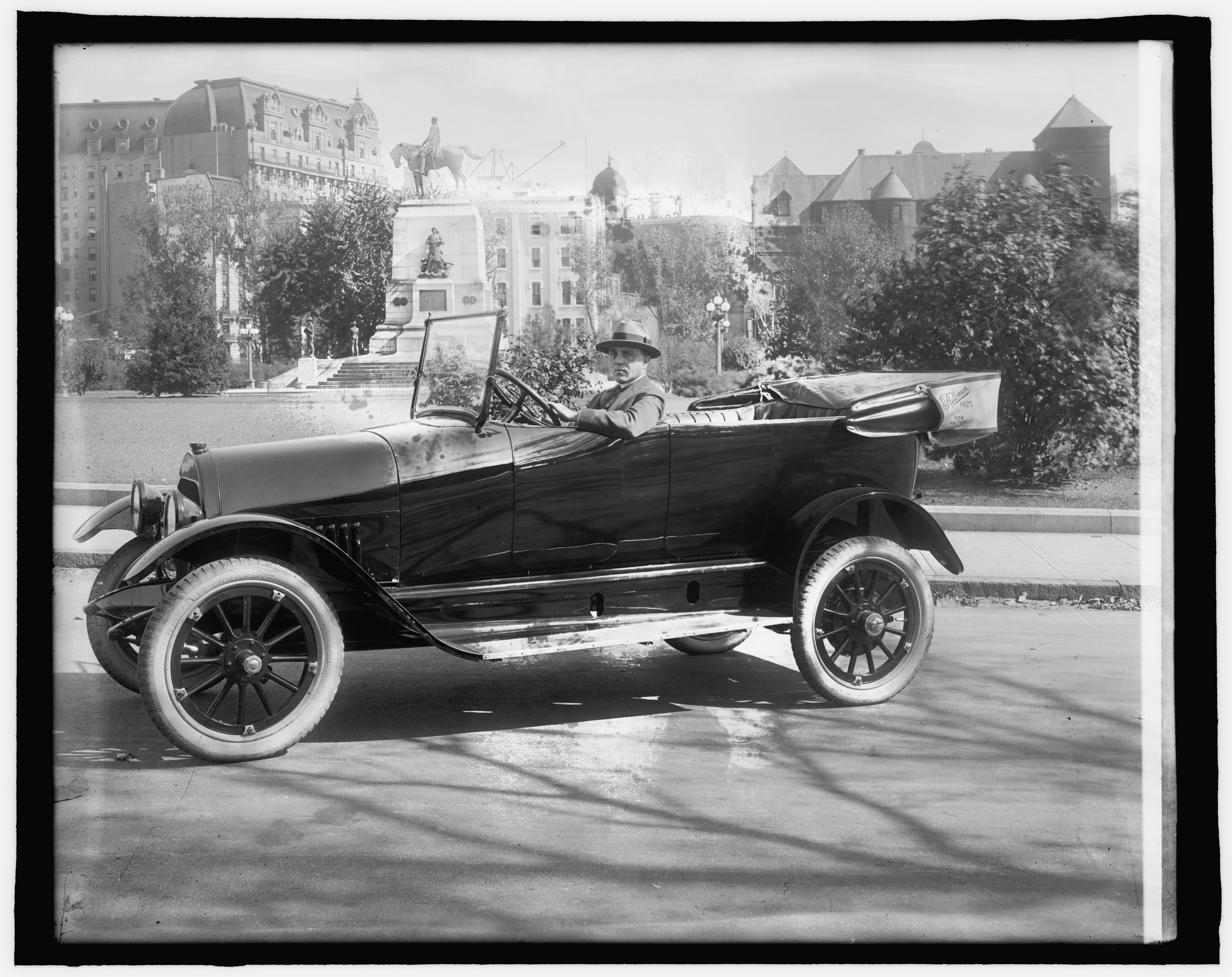
1917 Pullman automobile, William P. Barnhart, Washington D.C. Pullman dealer

== See also ==
- New York Times story on new cars for 1909
- Pullman automobiles at ConceptCarz
