= Texas Secretary of the Navy =

The Secretary of the Navy of the Republic of Texas was a member of the Cabinet of the President of the Republic of Texas responsible for naval affairs and management of the Texas Navy. The office lasted from 1836 until 1841, when it was merged with Secretary of War under the title Secretary of War and Marine by President Sam Houston during his second term.

Secretaries of the Navy of the Republic of Texas
From	To	Secretary of the Navy	President served under
March 17, 1836	October 22, 1836	Robert Potter (interim)	David G. Burnet (interim)
October 28, 1836	December 5, 1838	Samuel Rhoads Fisher	Sam Houston
December 5, 1838	December 13, 1838	William M. Shepherd (acting)	Sam Houston
December 13, 1838	May 1839	Memucan Hunt, Jr.	Mirabeau B. Lamar
May 1839	December 13, 1841	Louis P. Cooke	Mirabeau B. Lamar
