= Saddler v. Republic =

Legal case in the Republic of Texas

Saddler v. the Republic
- Court: Supreme Court of the Republic of Texas
- Full case name: Hiram Saddler v. the Republic of Texas
- Decided: 1844
- Citations: Dallam 610 (1844); 1844 WL 3895 (Tex.Rep.Sup.)

Holding
- That although more than one person must take part in an affray, at trial, one may still be convicted even if the others charged are acquitted

Court membership
- Judges sitting: John Hemphill, R. E. B. Baylor, Patrick C. Jack, William E. Jones, William J. Jones, Richard Morris, William B. Ochiltree

Case opinions
- Majority: Ochiltree

Saddler v. the Republic, Dallam 610 (1844), was a case decided by the Supreme Court of the Republic of Texas which held that although more than one person must take part in an affray, at trial, one may still be convicted even if the others charged are acquitted.

== Background ==
In the fall of 1843, the grand jury of Lamar County, Texas indicted Hiram Saddler, Thomas Doss, Joshua Dillingham and C. W. Saddler for an affray. Before trial, the prosecutor dropped charges against Dillingham, and the case went to trial against the other defendants. The jury found Hiram Saddler guilty, but acquitted the other two. Hiram Saddler appealed.

== Decision ==
Judge William B. Ochiltree issued the opinion of the Court. He noted that Hiram Saddler claimed that he could not be convicted if the others indicted with him were acquitted, and that it took more than one individual to create an affray, that they had to fight by consent. Ochiltree dismissed this contention, noting that fighting by consent was not part of the offense, but fight in public was, although not all parties need consent to the fight to be involved. Even if the others were acquitted, the conviction against Hiram Saddler was affirmed.
