= List of officials of the Republic of Texas =

A list of officials of the Republic of Texas, 1836–1846:

== First elected government of the Texas Republic ==
(October 22, 1836 to December 10, 1838)

=== President ===
- Sam Houston

=== Vice-President ===
- Mirabeau B. Lamar

=== Secretary of State ===
- Stephen F. Austin
- James P. Henderson
- Robert Anderson Irion

=== Secretary of War ===
- Thomas Jefferson Rusk
- William S. Fisher
- Barnard E. Bee
- Albert Sidney Johnston

=== Secretary of the Navy ===
- Samuel Rhoads Fisher
- William M. Shepherd

=== Secretary of Treasury ===
- Henry Smith

=== Attorney General ===
- James Collinsworth
- James P. Henderson
- Peter W. Grayson
- John Birdsall

=== Postmaster General ===
- Gustavus A. Parker
- Robert Barr

=== Commissioner of Land Office ===
- John P. Borden

== Second elected government of the Texas Republic ==
(December 10, 1838 through December 13, 1841)

=== President ===
- Mirabeau B. Lamar

=== Vice-President ===
- David G. Burnet

=== Secretary of State ===
- Barnard E. Bee
- James Webb
- Nathaniel C. Armory
- David G. Burnet
- Abner Smith Lipscomb
- James S. Mayfield

=== Secretary of War ===
- Albert Sidney Johnston
- Branch Tanner Archer

=== Secretary of the Navy ===
- Memucan Hunt
- Louis P. Cooke

=== Secretary of Treasury ===
- Richard G. Dunlap
- James Harper Starr
- James W. Simmons
- J.G. Chalmers
- James Webb

=== Attorney General ===
- John C. Watrous
- James Webb
- Francis Asbury Morris

=== Postmaster General ===
- Robert Barr
- Elijah Sterling Clack Robertson
- John Rice Jones, Jr.

=== Land Commissioner ===
- John P. Borden
- H. W. Raglin
- Thomas William Ward

== Third elected government of the Texas Republic ==
(December 13, 1841 through December 9, 1844)

=== President ===
- Sam Houston

=== Vice-President ===
- Edward Burleson

=== Secretary of State ===
- Anson Jones

=== Secretary of War & Marine ===
- George Washington Hockley
- Morgan C. Hamilton
- George Washington Hill

=== Secretary of Treasury ===
- E. Lawrence Stickney
- William Henry Daingerfield
- James B. Miller

=== Attorney General ===
- George W. Terrell

=== Land Commissioner ===
- Thomas W. Ward

== Fourth elected government of the Texas Republic ==
(December 9, 1844 to February 19, 1846 when Texas entered the Union)

=== President ===
- Anson Jones

=== Vice-President ===
- Kenneth L. Anderson

=== Secretary of State ===
- Ebenezer Allen
- Ashbel Smith

=== Secretary of War & Marine ===
- George Washington Hill
- Morgan C. Hamilton
- William Gordon Cooke

=== Attorney General ===
- Ebenezer Allen
- William Beck Ochiltree

=== Secretary of Treasury ===
- William Beck Ochiltree
- John Alexander Greer

=== Land Commissioner ===
- Thomas W. Ward
