= Herbert v. Moore =

Case decided by the Supreme Court of Texas

- Court: Supreme Court of the Republic of Texas
- Full case name: P.W. Herbert v. Thomas A. Moore
- Decided: 1844
- Citations: Dallam 592 (1844); 1844 WL 3881 (Tex.Rep.Sup.)

Holding
- That property taken by Indians in a raid were not subject to the rule of postliminy and were still the property of the original owner

Court membership
- Judges sitting: John Hemphill, R. E. B. Baylor, Patrick C. Jack, William E. Jones, William J. Jones, Richard Morris, William B. Ochiltree

Case opinions
- Majority: Wm. J. Jones, joined by Morris

Herbert v. Moore, Dallam 592 (1844), was a case decided by the Supreme Court of the Republic of Texas which held that property taken by Indians in a raid were not subject to the rule of postliminy and were still the property of the original owner.

== Background ==
On May 27, 1842, Indians stole horses and mules from P.W. Herbert in Bastrop County, Texas. Two days later a mule and other livestock was found in the possession of Indians about 30 miles from Austin. Thomas Moore and others recovered the stock after a fight, during which Moore lost his own horse. Herbert demanded his property back, but Moore refused, on the grounds that the taking of the stock for more than 24 hours stripped Herbert of title, and the recapture vested the title in Moore and those with him.

== Decision ==
Judge William J. Jones explained that Moore's position was based on the rule of postliminy, which was designed to handle property taken during war by an enemy. If the property is retaken within 24 hours, the original owner still maintains title, but if not retaken during that period, the original owner loses title. The question before the court was whether takings by Indians fell under this rule.

Jones noted that postliminy was a principle of international law and then examined whether Indians were separate nations for the purpose of the law. He stated that the Indians were a wandering tribe, not a nation, and that they did not claim any land nor exert sovereign authority over it. Nor had the Mexican government recognized the tribes as nations. Jones found "that, by our constitution and laws, the Indians have been reduced to a level with free negroes and mulattoes" and that they were therefore under control of the national government. Jones described the Indians as robbers, the same as pirates, and that it was not conducive to justice to allow postliminy to reward their actions.
