= Republic v. Inglish =

1844 legal case in the Republic of Texas

Republic of Texas v. Inglish
- Court: Supreme Court of the Republic of Texas
- Full case name: Republic of Texas v. Heirs of Joseph Inglish, deceased
- Decided: 1844
- Citations: Dallam 608 (1844); 1844 WL 3914 (Tex.Rep.Sup.)

Holding
- That to be a valid claim for land, the land claim must have been authorized by the constitution after March 2, 1836; or by authority under Mexican law prior to that date

Court membership
- Judges sitting: John Hemphill, R. E. B. Baylor, Patrick C. Jack, William E. Jones, William J. Jones, Richard Morris, William B. Ochiltree

Case opinions
- Majority: Wm. E. Jones

Republic of Texas v. Inglish, Dallam 608 (1844), was a case decided by the Supreme Court of the Republic of Texas which held that to be a valid claim for land, the land claim must have been authorized by the constitution after March 2, 1836; or by authority under Mexican law prior to that date.

== Background ==
On December 25, 1835, Joseph Inglish and his family immigrated to Texas, in what is now Lamar County. Inglish subsequently died on February 17, 1836. In 1841, his heirs brought a lawsuit for a league and a labor of land from the Republic. A jury found for the heirs and the Republic appealed.

== Decision ==
Judge William E. Jones determined that there were two questions to answer. First, did Inglish qualify for land under Republic law or constitution. Second, if not, did he qualify under Mexican law.

Jones first noted that Inglish died prior to the Texas Declaration of Independence. Since Texas was not an independent nation at the time of his death, he could not obtain title to land or a grant of land on that basis. By the same token, the laws of the Mexican state of Coahuila y Texas prohibited any new colonization and concurrent grant of land after May 2, 1835. Jones noted that Inglish entered after the Mexican law cut off new property grants and died before Texas could grant land. He further noted that this was not for the courts to remedy, but was up to the legislative branch.
