= Binge v. Smith =

Legal case in the Republic of Texas

- Court: Supreme Court of the Republic of Texas
- Full case name: William H. Binge & James Blair v. Sampson Smith
- Decided: 1844
- Citations: Dallam 616 (1844); 1844 WL 3886 (Tex.Rep.Sup.)

Holding
- That where one party to a joint contract dies, the survivor may be sued; that the drawer and indorser of a promissory note may and should be joined in the same action if both be sued simultaneously; and that where separate actions were brought at different terms in the same court, plaintiff might be required to consolidate unless manifest injustice would thereby be done.

Court membership
- Judges sitting: John Hemphill, R. E. B. Baylor, Patrick C. Jack, William E. Jones, William J. Jones, Richard Morris, William B. Ochiltree

Case opinions
- Majority: Wm. J. Jones
- Concurrence: Morris, joined by Baylor

Binge v. Smith, Dallam 616 (1844), was a case decided by the Supreme Court of the Republic of Texas which held that where one party to a joint contract dies, the survivor may be sued; that the drawer and indorser of a promissory note may and should be joined in the same action if both be sued simultaneously; and that where separate actions were brought at different terms in the same court, plaintiff might be required to consolidate unless manifest injustice would thereby be done.

== Background ==
Sometime before January 1, 1843, William H. Binge and a man named Titus entered into a contract. Binge made a promissory note, indorsed by James Blair, to pay Sampson Smith $300 on or before January 1, 1843. Payment was not made and Smith filed an action in Red River County, Texas. Binge and Blair did not appear, and they appealed from the default judgment.

== Decision ==
Judge William J. Jones delivered the opinion of the court. The contention that in a joint contract required both parties be sued was not supportable under either common law or statute. Second, Jones noted that the plaintiff could bring actions against both the maker and indorser, so long as he followed the proper procedure, which he did.

Jones noted that even had Smith sued Binge, Titus, and Blair separately, the judge may have joined the cases anyway to reduce costs.

=== Dissent ===
Judges Richard Morris and R. E. B. Baylor dissented, believing that the joinder was not permitted. They would have reversed on that ground.
