= List of Supreme Court of the Republic of Texas cases =

This is a list of cases decided by the Supreme Court of the Republic of Texas.

== 1840 ==
- Republic v. McCullough, Dallam 357 (1840).
- Hunter v. Oelrich, Dallam 358 (1840).
- Dangerfield v. Secretary of State, Dallam 358 (1840).
- Edwards v. Peoples, Dallam 359 (1840).
- Board of Land Com'rs v. Weede, Dallam 361 (1840).
- Goode v. Cheshire, Dallam 362 (1840).
- Yeamans v. Tone, Dallam 362 (1840).
- Winfield v. Yates, Dallam 363 (1840).
- Soy's Estate v. McMullen, Dallam 363 (1840).
- Patton v. Robert Mills & Co., Dallam 364 (1840).
- Board of Land Com'rs v. Bell, Dallam 366 (1840).
- Harvey v. Patterson, Dallam 369 (1840).
- Mann v. Thruston, Dallam 370 (1840).
- Allen v. Ward, Dallam 371 (1840).
- Whiteman v. Garrett, Dallam 374 (1840).
- Republic v. Mumford, Dallam 374 (1840).
- Andrews v. Andrews, Dallam 375 (1840).
- Republic v. Bynum, Dallam 376 (1840).

== 1841 ==
- Bailey v. Haddy, Dallam 376 (1841).
- Stafford v. Perker, Dallam 380 (1841).
- Board of Land Com'rs v. Reily, Dallam 381 (1841).
- Weede v. Board of Land Com'rs, Dallam 386 (1841).
- Raquet v. Nixon, Dallam 386 (1841).
- Cartwright v. Roberts, Dallam 389 (1841).
- Reece v. Smith, Dallam 390 (1841).
- Grayson v. Cummins, Dallam 391 (1841).
- Guest v. Guest, Dallam 394 (1841).
- Board of Land Com'rs v. Herring, Dallam 395 (1841).
- Morton v. Gordon, Dallam 396 (1841).
- Fowler v. Poor, Dallam 401 (1841).
- Cayce v. Curtis, Dallam 403 (1841).
- Cayce v. Horton, Dallam 405 (1841).
- Ex parte De Bland, Dallam 406 (1841).
- Republic v. Smith, Dallam 407 (1841).
- Republic v. Laughlin, Dallam 412 (1841).
- Rice v. Powell, Dallam 413 (1841).
- Mills v. Waller, Dallam 416 (1841).
- Hill v. M'Dermot, Dallam 419 (1841).
- Knight v. Huff, Dallam 425 (1841).
- Andrews v. Andrews, Dallam 427 (1841).
- O'Connor v. Van Homme, Dallam 429 (1841).
- Hall v. Allcorn, Dallam 433 (1841).
- Austin v. W.C. White & Co., Dallam 434 (1841).
- Hall v. Phelps, Dallam 435 (1841).
- McKinney v. Bradbury, Dallam 441 (1841).
- Austin v. Sawyer, Dallam 445 (1841).
- Austin v. Andrews, Dallam 447 (1841).
- Hirams v. Coit, Dallam 449 (1841).

== 1842 ==
- Republic v. Young, Dallam 464 (1842). Decided that residence or domicile consists of physical presence and intent to remain.

== 1844 ==
- Republic v. Skidmore, Dallam 581 (1844). Concerning headwright certificates issued to families residing in Texas on the date independence was declared.
- Herbert v. Moore, Dallam 592 (1844). Determined that Indians were not sovereign nations, the rule of postliminy did not apply to property taken by Indians.
- Republic v. Inglish, Dallam 608 (1844). To obtain a land grant, it must be authorized under either the national constitution or laws, or the laws of the Mexican government prior to independence.
- Saddler v. Republic, Dallam 610 (1844). Although it takes more than one to be in an affray, a conviction against one will stand even if the others are acquitted.
- Binge v. Smith, Dallam 616 (1844). Dealing with permissive joinder of a lawsuit.
