= Republic v. Bynum =

Legal case in the Republic of Texas

- Court: Supreme Court of the Republic of Texas
- Full case name: Republic of Texas v. William D. Bynum
- Decided: 1840
- Citations: Dallam 376 (1840); 1840 Tex. LEXIS 18

Holding
- That uncertainty in the description of the offense charged in the indictment requires that the person be discharged from custody.

Court membership
- Judges sitting: Thomas Jefferson Rusk, Anthony B. Shelby, William J. Jones, John T. Mills, and John Hemphill

Case opinions
- Majority: Wm. J. Jones

Republic v. Bynum, Dallam 376 (1844), was a case decided by the Supreme Court of the Republic of Texas which held that uncertainty in the description of the offense charged in the indictment requires that the person be discharged from custody. The Court issued a writ of habeas corpus to order the release of the prisoner.

== Background ==
William D. Bynum was convicted of an offense and confined, and requested a writ of habeas corpus.

== Decision ==
Judge William J. Jones stated that the indictment charged "or other articles of value" did not sufficiently describe a criminal offense. It is not listed as an offense under either the common law or the statutes of the Republic. He then stated that the rules of construction (describing the rule of lenity) required that these matters be determined in favor of the accused, and issued the writ to discharge Bynum from custody.
