= Supreme Court of the Republic of Texas =

Highest court in the Republic of Texas

- Seal of the Republic of Texas
- Established: 1836
- Dissolved: 1846
- Jurisdiction: Republic of Texas
- Location: Austin, Texas
- Composition method: Congressional election
- Authorised by: Constitution of the Republic of Texas
- Number of positions: Chief Justice, 8 District Judges (ex officio members)

The Supreme Court of the Republic of Texas was the court of last resort for legal matters in the Republic of Texas from the Republic's independence from Mexico in 1836 until its annexation by the United States of America in 1846. The current Supreme Court of Texas was established that year. However, despite the court being around for quite some time, it did not begin hearing cases until the 1840s. Before the 1840s, there was one Chief Justice and four Associate Judges comprising the Supreme Court of Texas.The Supreme Court of Texas has expanded throughout the years, leading to one Chief Justice and eight Associate Judges.

== Organization of the Court ==
The Court was established by the Constitution of 1836, which created the Supreme Court and such inferior courts as the Texas Congress might from time to time establish. The constitution also mandated that the Republic be divided into judicial districts, and that the district judges would serve as the associate judges on the Supreme Court, along with a Chief Justice. The judges were elected by Congress for a term of four years. The president of Texas appoints the Chief Justice, while the Associate Judges are elected through a partisan system that allows the House and Senate to know what party the candidate affiliate with. The district judges rode the circuit in their district during the spring and fall, leaving only the summer and winter for the judges to sit as the Supreme Court.

=== Jurisdiction ===
The Court had unlimited appellate jurisdiction. In the first statute establishing the district courts, Congress set $300 as the minimum amount in controversy for the appeal of a decision from the district court to the Supreme Court. In 1841 the Court declared that limit unconstitutional in Morton v. Gordon and Alley, stating that all final judgments of the district courts were able to be appealed to the Supreme Court. The same district court enabling act did not provide for appeal to the Supreme Court of criminal matters, which the Court resolved in Republic v. Smith, stating that the constitution gave jurisdiction to the Court over all criminal appeals.

=== Operation of the Court ===
On December 15, 1836, the Texas Congress passed the implementing statute establishing the courts of Texas, and elected the chief justice and four district judges the next day. The four district judges covered 22 counties and were ex officio members of the Supreme Court. The court was to meet for one session a year, beginning on the first Monday in December, and required a majority of the judges to be present. Most sessions were held in Austin until in 1850s, it expanded to other places like Galveston and Tyler. Though, it did go back and forth of allowing only Austin or adding other places. When the court first expanded, they would bring a clerk to accompany the Judge but in 1864, Galveston and Tyler would get their own clerk and data systems. The opinions of the court are collected in a private reporter, Dallam's Decisions, in only one volume.

== Justices of the Court ==
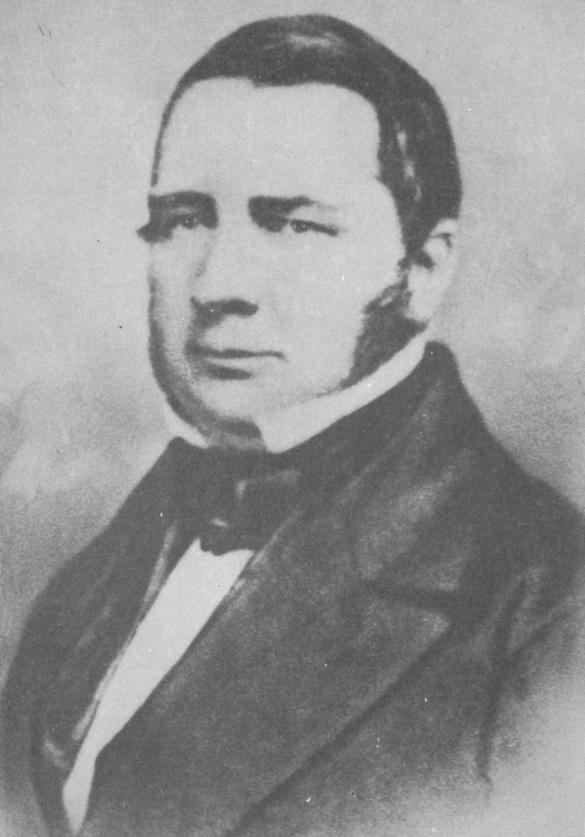
Thomas J. Rusk, Chief Justice from 1838 to 1840

=== Chief Justices ===
The Court had a Chief Justice and originally four district judges who served as associate judges. This was expanded to five in 1838 and seven in 1840. The Associate Judges was increased once again to eight in 1945.The first Chief Justice was James Collinsworth, who was an ally of Sam Houston, the president-elect of the new republic. (Note: Collinsworth was 30 years old, had been the U.S. Attorney for the Western District of Tennessee, and signed the Texas Declaration of Independence and help draft the Constitution. He drowned in 1838 while running for President, to replace Houston.) On Collinsworth's death, Houston appointed John Birdsall to the post. When Mirabeau B. Lamar became president, Congress refused to confirm Birdsall and elected Thomas Jefferson Rusk instead. (Note: Although required to convene on the first Monday of December (later changed to January), the Court had never had a quorum until Rusk convened it in January 1840.)

In 1840, Rusk resigned and was replaced by John Hemphill, who served until the annexation of Texas. (Note: Hemphill served as Chief Justice until 1958, when he was appointed U.S. Senator, replacing Sam Houston.). The election in Congress was contested, with John Scott, former Solicitor General of North Carolina; James Webb, former U.S. District judge and Attorney General of Texas; and Hemphill all in the running for Chief Justice. Hemphill has been compared to John Marshall in laying down the legal foundation of Texas law, especially in the area of land titles, marital property, and homestead exemptions.

=== District judges ===
The original four district court judges elected by Congress were Shelby Corzine, Benjamin Cromwell Franklin, (Note: Judge Franklin has the distinction of being the first judge appointed by the Republic, abet outside of the required process. The Texas Navy had captured a United States ship, the brig Pocket, which was carrying contraband to a Mexican port. President David G. Burnet appointed Franklin as a district judge to hear the case.) Robert McAlpin Williamson, and James W. Robinson. Due to delays in the Supreme Court sitting in session, these four judges (along with the first two chief justices) never sat with the Supreme Court.

=== Succession of seats ===
Chief Justice
Established by the Constitution of the Republic of Texas; Enabling Act, Dec. 15, 1836
James Collinsworth	1836-1838 (Note: Elected by Texas Congress, died in office, June 1838.)
John Birdsall	1838 (Note: Appointed by President Sam Houston, the Senate would not ratify the appointment.)
Thomas Jefferson Rusk	1838-1840 (Note: Elected by Texas Congress, resigned May 1840.)
John Hemphill	1840-1845 (Note: Elected by Texas Congress.)

First District
Established by the Constitution of Republic of Texas; Enabling Act, Dec. 22, 1836
Shelby Corzine	1836-1839 (Note: Elected by Texas Congress, died in office, February 1839.)
Ezekiel Wimberly Cullen	1839 (Note: Appointed by President Mirabeau B. Lamar.)
Anthony B. Shelby	1839-1841 (Note: Elected by Texas Congress, resigned September 1841. Both Shelby and Johnson attempted to hold court at the same time)
Thomas Johnson (Texas jurist)	1841 (Note: Elected by Texas Congress, resigned September 1841.)
Richard Morris (Texas jurist)	1841-1844 (Note: Appointed, then elected by Texas Congress, died in office August 1844.)
John Baker Jones	1844-1845 (Note: Appointed, then elected by Texas Congress.)

Second District
Established by the Constitution of Republic of Texas; Enabling Act, Dec. 22, 1836
Benjamin Cromwell Franklin	1836-1839 (Note: Elected by Texas Congress, resigned February 1839.)
Henry W. Fontaine	1839 (Note: Appointed by President Lamar, resigned after one month.)
William Jefferson Jones	1840-1845 (Note: Elected by Texas Congress.)

Third District
Established by the Constitution of Republic of Texas; Enabling Act, Dec. 22, 1836
Robert McAlpin Williamson	1836-1839 (Note: Elected by Texas Congress, resigned January 1839.)
John T. Mills	1839-1840 (Note: Elected by Texas Congress, youngest member (21 at election). Later on court from 7th District.)
Robert Emmett Bledsoe Baylor	1841-1845 (Note: Elected by Texas Congress.)

Fourth District
Established by the Constitution of Republic of Texas; Enabling Act, Dec. 22, 1836
James W. Robinson	1836-1840 (Note: Elected by Texas Congress, resigned January 1839.)
John Hemphill	1840 (Note: Elected by Texas Congress, became Chief Justice December 1840.)
Anderson Hutchinson	1841-1843 (Note: Elected by Texas Congress, resigned June 1843.)
William Early Jones	1843-1845 (Note: Elected by Texas Congress.)

Fifth District
Established by the Constitution of Republic of Texas; Enabling Act, May 24, 1838
Edward Thomas Branch	1838-1840 (Note: Elected by Texas Congress, resigned June 1840.)
George Whitfield Terrell	1840-1842 (Note: Appointed by President Lamar, elected by Texas Congress the following year, resigned January 1842.)
William Beck Ochiltree	1842-1845 (Note: Elected by Texas Congress, resigned December 1844.)
Royall Tyler Wheeler	1845 (Note: Elected by Texas Congress.)

Sixth District
Established by the Constitution of Republic of Texas; Enabling Act, Jan. 29, 1840
Richardson A. Scurry	1840-1841 (Note: Elected by Texas Congress, resigned February 1841.)
Patrick Churchill Jack	1841-1844 (Note: Elected by Texas Congress, died in office.)
Milford Phillips Norton	1844-1845 (Note: Appointed by President Houston and elected by the Texas Congress.)

Seventh District
Established by the Constitution of Republic of Texas; Enabling Act, Jan. 29, 1840
John M. Hansford	1840-1842 (Note: Elected by Texas Congress, resigned before impeachment.)
John T. Mills	1843-1845 (Note: Elected by Texas Congress. Previously on court from 3rd District.)

== Sessions ==
=== 1837 and 1839 ===
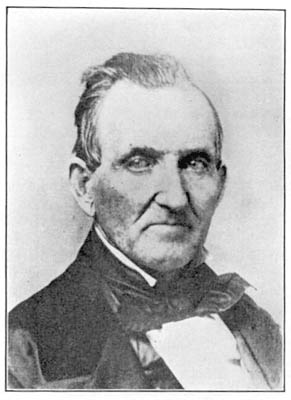
Judge James Robinson never sat at a session of the Supreme Court

No session was held in 1837, probably because a majority of the judges were not present. Two weeks after the Court was supposed to have met, Congress passed a statute which would impose a $1,000 fine on a judge who did not appear for a session. A short time later, Congress eliminated the scheduled 1838 session when it moved the annual date to the second Monday in January. In the meantime, Collinsworth died and Houston replaced him with Birdsall until Congress could meet and elect a new Chief Justice. Rusk was elected, but did not receive word of his election until after the 1839 session had been scheduled to occur and been canceled for lack of a Chief Justice.

=== 1840 ===
The first session in which the Texas Supreme Court met was the January 1840 session, in Austin. The Court consisted of Chief Justice Rusk, and District Judges Shelby, W.J. Jones, Mills, and Hemphill. The clerk was W. Fairfax Gray. The court disposed of 49 cases on its docket, but issued only 18 opinions. Thirteen cases were decided without opinion; the rest were continued to the following term. The court issued what appear to be the first writ of mandamus and first writ of habeas corpus in Texas. (Note: The mandamus was issued in Dangerfield v. Secretary of State and the habeas was issued in Republic v. Bynum)

=== 1841 ===
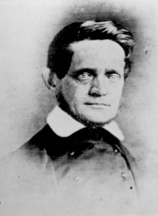
John Hemphill, Chief Justice from 1840 to 1845

The January 1841 session was attended by Chief Justice Hemphill and District Judges Baylor, Hutchinson, Terrell, Scurry, and Hansford. Gray was the clerk. The District Judges from the First and Second Districts were not in attendance.

=== 1842 ===
The January 1842 session was attended by Chief Justice Hemphill and District Judges Morris, Baylor, Hutchinson, Ochiltree, Jack, and Mills. Thomas Green was the clerk. The District Judge from the Second District did not attend.

=== 1843 ===
The June 1843 session was attended by Chief Justice Hemphill and District Judges Morris, Baylor, Ochiltree, and Jack. Green was the clerk. The District Judges from the Second, Fourth, and Seventh Districts did not attend.

=== 1844 ===
The June 1844 session was attended by Chief Justice Hemphill and District Judges Morris, W.J. Jones, Baylor, W.E. Jones, Ochiltree, and Jack. Green was the clerk. The District Judge from the Seventh District did not attend.

=== 1845 ===
The December 1845 session was the last session of the Court. It was attended by Chief Justice Hemphill and District Judges J. B. Jones, W. J. Jones, Baylor, W. E. Jones, Wheeler, and Norton. Green was the clerk. The District Judge from the seventh district did not attend. Texas is annexed into the U.S. and Austin has become the capital of Texas

=== 1846 ===
The first Supreme Court under U.S. statehood is formed. John Hemphill becomes the first Chief Justice of the new state Court

=== 1850 ===
A constitutional amendment allows the court to hold sessions other than Austin like Galveston and Tyler.

=== 1861 ===
Texas secedes from the Union; Oran M. Roberts joins the court as Associate Judge with tensions growing from the civil war.

=== 1866 ===
After the war, a new state constitution is adopted, but soon all Supreme Court Justices are removed by Union military authorities.

=== 1867 ===
Military reconstruction leads to federal appointment of new Justices, including Amos as Chief Justice.

=== 1869 ===
A new Texas Constitution is enacted, consolidating the court only in Austin again.

=== 1873 ===
Ogden becomes Chief Justice; a December amendment restores traveling court sessions to Galveston and Tyler once again.

== Woman in the Court ==
In 1925, Governor Pat M. Neff made history by creating an All-Women Supreme Court. This court was created to hear the Johnson v. Darr, a land dispute case involving the Woodmen of the World men who appealed their case and were approved. However, a conflict of interest with members of Woodmen of the World within the Supreme Court prevented them from hearing the case. Governor Pat M. Neff turned towards women since every men he encountered belonged to the group. He created the final panel of Hortense Ward (Chief Justice), Ruth V. Brazzil, and Hattie L. Henenberg. These women heard the case in January 1925 and issued their ruling in May, siding with El Paso that allowed the group to have both tracts of land. This event led to Miriam A. Ferguson becoming the first woman governor of Texas, but it would still take a decade before women were allowed to serve full time on the court.

== See also ==
- List of Supreme Court of the Republic of Texas cases
- Bibliography of the Texas Revolution, Republic, and Annexation
