= Dangerfield v. Secretary of State =

Legal case in the Republic of Texas

- Court: Supreme Court of the Republic of Texas
- Full case name: Dangerfield v. Secretary of State
- Decided: 1840
- Citations: Dallam 358 (1840); 1840 Tex. LEXIS 3

Holding
- That the President does not have the authority to appoint the county court chief justice, the Congress established the process to fill the office by Congressional election

Court membership
- Judges sitting: Thomas Jefferson Rusk, Anthony B. Shelby, William J. Jones, John T. Mills, and John Hemphill

Case opinions
- Majority: Mills

Laws applied
- Tex. Const. art. IV § 1, art. VI § 5

Dangerfield v. Secretary of State, Dallam 592 (1844), was a case decided by the Supreme Court of the Republic of Texas which held that the President does not have the authority to appoint the county court chief justice, the Texas Congress established the process to fill the office by Congressional election. The Court issued a writ of mandamus to settle the dispute.

== Background ==
The dispute centered on whether the President of the Republic had the right to appoint the chief justice of the county courts, or whether the Texas Congress had the right to elect the justices. While the Texas Constitution mentioned that there was to be a court in every county, it did not mention county court judges. That office was created by statute.

== Decision ==
Judge John T. Mills wrote the opinion of the court. He first noted that the courts of the republic did not have the authority to summon the President, and to hold him in contempt if he did not answer. In examining the constitutional question, Mills said that the President had the authority to appoint officers of the Republic who were named by the constitution, but for which a method of selection had not been provided. He then noted that the county court chief justice was not such an officer, that they were an officer of an inferior court, created by Congress and which Congress had provided a selection method for by election by both houses of Congress.

== Subsequent developments ==
This is the first recorded case of mandamus being used in Texas. It is also the only case during the Republic where the Court exercised original jurisdiction instead of appellate jurisdiction.
