= List of Supreme Court cases =

List of Supreme Court cases could refer to:

- List of Victorian Supreme Court cases, Australia
- List of Supreme Court of Canada cases
- List of Irish Supreme Court cases
- List of Supreme Court of Kenya cases
- List of cases of the Supreme Court of Pakistan
- List of cases of the Supreme Court of New Zealand
- List of Tasmanian Supreme Court cases
- List of United Kingdom Supreme Court cases
  - List of Supreme Court of Judicature cases
- Lists of United States Supreme Court cases
  - List of Supreme Court of the Republic of Texas cases
