= George W. Smyth =

American politician

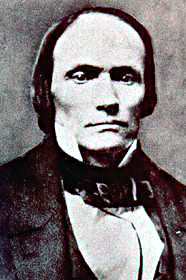

Member of the U.S. House of Representatives from Texas's 1st district
- In office March 4, 1853 – March 3, 1855
- Preceded by: Richardson A. Scurry
- Succeeded by: Lemuel D. Evans

Personal details
- Born: George Washington Smyth; May 16, 1803 North Carolina, U.S.
- Died: February 21, 1866 (aged 62) Austin, Texas, U.S.
- Party: Democratic

George Washington Smyth (May 16, 1803 – February 21, 1866) was a Texas politician and a Democratic member of the United States House of Representatives. Before serving in Congress, he was the commissioner of the Texas General Land Office from 1848 to 1851. He is also noted as a signer of the Texas Declaration of Independence.

== Biography ==
Smyth was born in North Carolina on May 16, 1803. He was raised in Alabama and in Murfreesboro, Tennessee. He attended the local schools where he lived, and an academy in Murfreesboro. He graduated from Princeton University in 1831, and then moved to Texas, which was then a province of Mexico. He resided in what is now Jasper County, where he farmed and engaged in several business ventures.

During his early years in Texas, Smyth was appointed by the Mexican government to offices including surveyor and commissioner of land titles. In 1835, he served as a delegate to the convention that created the provisional government known as the Texas Consultation. In 1836, he was a delegate to the convention that declared Texas independence, and he signed the constitution of the Republic of Texas.

Smyth served in the Texas government, including appointment as commissioner in charge of determining the boundary line between the Republic of Texas and the United States. He was a deputy in the Texas Congress in 1845, and was one of the authors of the constitution enacted after Texas attained statehood. In 1848, he was elected commissioner of the state's general land office.

In 1852, Smyth was elected to the United States House of Representatives as a Democrat. He served in the 33rd Congress (March 4, 1853 – March 3, 1855), but declined renomination in 1854.

Smyth was a Unionist and ardently opposed southern secession, a position that was not shared by his two sons, both of whom served in the Confederate Army. After the war, he was a delegate to the 1866 state constitutional convention that led to Texas' readmission to the Union. He died in Austin, Texas, on February 21, 1866, while attending a session of the convention. Smyth was buried in Austin's Texas State Cemetery.

Political offices
Preceded by Thomas W. Ward	Commissioner of the Texas General Land Office; January 4, 1841 – March 20, 1848	Succeeded by Stephen Crosby
U.S. House of Representatives
Preceded by Richardson A. Scurry	Member of the U.S. House of Representatives from Texas's 1st congressional district 1853–1855	Succeeded by Lemuel D. Evans
