= Kenneth Lewis Anderson =

Texian politician (1805–1845)

Kenneth L. Anderson

4th Vice President of the Republic of Texas
- In office December 9, 1844 – July 3, 1845
- President: Anson Jones
- Preceded by: Edward Burleson
- Succeeded by: Vacant (1845–46); Office abolished (1846)

6th Speaker of the Texas House of Representatives (Republic of Texas)
- In office November 1, 1841 – November 24, 1842
- Preceded by: David Spangler Kaufman
- Succeeded by: Nicholas Henry Darnell

Personal details
- Born: September 11, 1805 Hillsborough, North Carolina, U.S.
- Died: July 3, 1845 (aged 39) Anderson, Texas, U.S.
- Occupation: Lawyer

Kenneth Lewis Anderson (September 11, 1805 – July 3, 1845) was a lawyer, the fourth and last vice president of the Republic of Texas, 1844 to 1845.

Anderson was born in Hillsborough, North Carolina, where he worked as a shoemaker at an early age. By 1824 he was living in Bedford County, Tennessee, where he became deputy sheriff in 1826 and sheriff in 1830; he was a colonel in the militia by 1832.

In 1837, he and his family moved to San Augustine, Texas, where his wife's brother-in-law Joseph Rowe had lived for five years. In 1838 Anderson served successively as deputy sheriff and sheriff. It was probably after he arrived in Texas that he studied to become a lawyer. President of Texas Mirabeau B. Lamar appointed him collector of customs for the district of San Augustine, and he was confirmed on November 21, 1839. He served as collector until he became a candidate from San Augustine County for the Texas House of Representatives of the Sixth Congress in 1841; he won with the largest majority in San Augustine County's history at that time.

As a partisan of Sam Houston, Anderson was elected Speaker of the House on November 1, 1841. He immediately led an unsuccessful attempt to impeach President Lamar and Vice President David G. Burnet. Anderson had for a time been considered for secretary of the treasury of the republic, a post that went to William Henry Daingerfield. In 1842 he helped convince President Houston to veto the popular but dangerous war bill, which sought to force an invasion of Mexico.

After one term, and despite Houston's pleas, Anderson retired later in 1842 to practice law in San Augustine with Royall T. Wheeler; he eventually formed a partnership with J. Pinckney Henderson and Thomas Jefferson Rusk. In December, Anderson became district attorney of the Fifth Judicial District. In 1844, Anderson was frequently mentioned as a candidate for president of the republic, but eventually he became the candidate for vice president, on a ticket headed by Anson Jones. Anderson's opponent, Patrick Jack, died before the election, and Anderson won nearly unanimously. He presided over the Senate at Washington-on-the-Brazos, Texas in June 1845, when the Texas Congress approved the Texas Annexation by the United States.

After the annexation vote, he immediately left for home despite being sick. After only twenty miles, at the Fanthorp Inn in modern-day Anderson, Texas, his fever flared and he died in office at age 39. The Vice President had been considered the leading candidate to become the first governor of Texas. His law partner, Pinckney Henderson, was instead elected governor in December.

Both Anderson County and the town of Anderson in Texas are named after him.

Political offices
Preceded by Edward Burleson	Vice President of the Republic of Texas; 1844–1845	Succeeded by Office abolished in 1846
