= 1851 Texas gubernatorial election =

- August 4, 1851
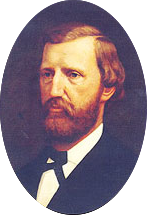

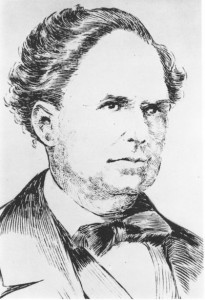

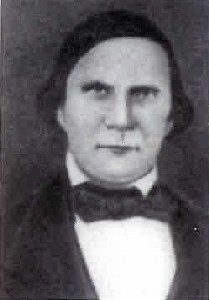

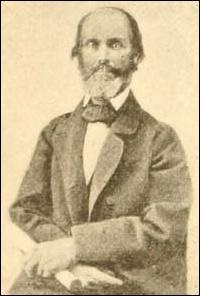
Nominee	Peter H. Bell	Middleton T. Johnson	John A. Greer
Party	Democratic	Democratic	Democratic
Popular vote	13,595	5,262	4,061
Percentage	48.20%	18.59%	14.35%
Nominee	Benjamin H. Epperson	Thomas J. Chambers
Party	Whig	Democratic
Popular vote	2,971	2,320
Percentage	10.49%	8.20%
- County results Bell: 40–50% 50–60% 60–70% 70–80% 80–90% 90–100% Johnson: 20–30% 30–40% 40–50% 60–70% 70–80% 80–90% 90–100% Greer: 20–30% 30–40% 40–50% 50–60% 60–70% 70–80% Epperson: 40–50% Chambers: 50–60% No Data/Vote
Governor before election
Peter H. Bell
Democratic
Elected Governor
Peter H. Bell
Democratic

The 1851 Texas gubernatorial election was held on August 4, 1851, to elect the governor of Texas. Incumbent Governor Peter Hansborough Bell was reelected to a second term, receiving 48% of the vote. His nearest challenger, Middleton T. Johnson, won just 19%.

== General election ==
=== Candidates ===
- Peter Hansborough Bell, incumbent governor, veteran of the Mexican-American War, former Texas Rangers captain, veteran of the Battle of San Jacinto (Democratic)
- Thomas J. Chambers, former chief justice of Texas, land speculator and real estate developer (Democratic)
- Benjamin H. Epperson, lawyer, former state representative (Whig)
- John Alexander Greer, incumbent lieutenant governor, former Secretary of the Treasury of the Republic of Texas, President pro tempore of the Senate in the Congress of the Republic of Texas (Democratic)
- Middleton T. Johnson, unsuccessful candidate for lieutenant governor in 1849, Texas Ranger and militia leader, former representative in Alabama House of Representatives (Democratic)

==== Withdrew ====
- Elisha M. Pease, state senator, former Comptroller of Public Accounts of the Republic of Texas (Democratic)

=== Results ===
1851 Texas gubernatorial election
Party	Candidate	Votes	%
Democratic	Peter Hansborough Bell (incumbent)	13,595	48.20%
Democratic	Middleton T. Johnson	5,262	18.59%
Democratic	John Alexander Greer	4,061	14.35%
Whig	Benjamin H. Epperson	2,971	10.49%
Democratic	Thomas J. Chambers	2,320	8.20%
Write-in		100	0.35%
Total votes		28,309	100.00%
Democratic hold			
