= Francis Asbury Morris =

American lawyer, politician, and pastor (1817–1881)

Texas Attorney General
- In office May 10, 1841 – December 13, 1841
- Preceded by: James Webb
- Succeeded by: George Whitfield Terrell

Personal details
- Born: September 3, 1817 Marietta, Ohio, US
- Died: September 24, 1881 (aged 64) St. Louis, Missouri, US
- Resting place: Bellefontaine Cemetery
- Parent: Thomas Asbury Morris (father)
- Occupation: Lawyer, politician, pastor

Francis Asbury Morris (September 3, 1817 – September 24, 1881) was an American lawyer, politician, and pastor. He served as Texas Attorney General, later becoming a Methodist circuit rider in Missouri.

== Biography ==
Morris was born on September 3, 1817, in Marietta, Ohio, the second child born to bishop Thomas Asbury Morris and Abigail (née Scales) Morris. He read law and was admitted to the bar, and in the late 1830s, moved to Texas. President Mirabeau B. Lamar appointed him the interim Texas Attorney General, which he served as from May 10, 1841, to December 13 of the same year, leaving office alongside the election of Sam Houston.

In 1842, Morris became the professor of ancient languages at the St. Charles College, in St. Charles, Missouri. He subsequently became a minister of the Methodist Episcopal Church. In 1845, when the St. Louis Methodist Conference was founded, he worked as a circuit rider across Missouri. He retired from circuit riding in 1882.

On October 15, 1845, Morris married Mary Fielding, with whom he had one child. He died on September 24, 1881, aged 64, in St. Louis, and was buried at Bellefontaine Cemetery.
