= American Union =

American Union may refer to:

- American Union Against Militarism
- American unionism
- North American Union
- Union (American Civil War)
- Union of South American Nations
- United States of America
