= Judge Shelby =

Judge Shelby may refer to:

- Anthony B. Shelby (1789–1851), justice of the Supreme Court of the Republic of Texas
- David Davie Shelby (1847–1914), judge of the United States Court of Appeals for the Fifth Circuit and the United States Circuit Courts for the Fifth Circuit
- Robert J. Shelby (born 1970), judge of the United States District Court for the District of Utah
