= Dallam's Decisions =

Dallam's Decisions is a case law reporter that was published by James Wilmer Dallam in Texas that included opinions of the Supreme Court of the Republic of Texas, with the exception of the final year of the court (1845). It has the only record of opinions for the court, as no official reporter was published. The opinions were first printed in 1845, in "Dallam's Digest of Texas Laws" on pages 357–632. It was reprinted in 1881, using the same pagination as the original.
