= John M. Hansford =

American politician and judge (died 1844)

Mmber of the Republic of Texas House of Representatives from the Shelby County district
- In office 1838–1840

Speaker of the Republic of Texas House of Representatives
- In office 1838–1839
- Preceded by: Joseph Rowe
- Succeeded by: David S. Kaufman

Justice of the Supreme Court of the Republic of Texas
- In office 1840–1842
- Preceded by: Seat created
- Succeeded by: John T. Mills

Personal details
- Died: January 1944
- Occupation: Politician, judge

John M. Hansford (died January 1844) was an American politician and judge who was a justice of the Supreme Court of the Republic of Texas from 1840 to 1842.

== Biography ==
Hansford was a lawyer and physician. In 1837, he moved from Glasgow, Kentucky, to near Jonesville, Texas. From 1838 to 1840, he served two terms in the Republic of Texas, representing Shelby County. In 1838 and 1839, he was Speaker of the House.

Hansford was the inaugural judge of the Fannin County district court. He was appointed judge of the Seventh District court on January 31, 1840. This made him a justice of the Supreme Court of the Republic of Texas, which was a consolidation of district courts. In July 1841, durong the Regulator–Moderator War, he dismissed the trial of "Regulator" bellingrent Charles W. Jackson. As a result, he faced impeachment, choosing to leave office on January 19, 1842.

After leaving office, Hansford began farming near Jonesville; he owned slaves. He was married. He was a member of the Freemasons. In January 1844, he and his wife returned home from a church service, and were greeted by a group of armed "Regulators". They ordered he relinquish some slaves which he had acquired by seizing through mortgage. He refused, and as a result was shot dead by a man named Mosley, and his son-in-law, Bullard. His place of burial is unknown, though was nearby Jonesville. Hansford County, organized in 1889, was named for him.

Political offices
Preceded by Newly created seat	Justice of the Texas Supreme Court; 1840–1842	Succeeded by John T. Mills
