= George Tyler Wood =

Governor of Texas from 1847 to 1849

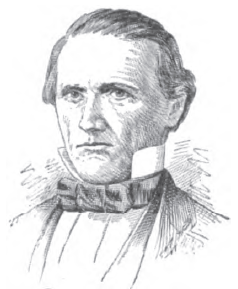

2nd Governor of Texas
- In office December 21, 1847 – December 21, 1849
- Lieutenant: John Alexander Greer
- Preceded by: James Pinckney Henderson
- Succeeded by: Peter Hansborough Bell

Member of the Texas Senate from the 7th district
- In office February 16, 1846 – 1847
- Preceded by: District established
- Succeeded by: William C. Abbott

Personal details
- Born: March 12, 1795 Cuthbert, Georgia, U.S.
- Died: September 3, 1858 (aged 63) Point Blank, Texas, U.S.
- Party: Democratic
- Profession: Soldier, Public Official

George Tyler Wood (March 12, 1795 – September 3, 1858) was an American military officer and politician who served as the second governor of Texas from 1847 to 1849.

== Background ==
Most records dealing with Wood's personal life have been lost due to fire or other causes. As a result, many details about his life are unknown. Wood was born near Cuthbert, Georgia on March 12, 1795. His mother was Elizabeth Burris Wood. His father, whose name is unknown, died when he was five. When he was nineteen, Wood raised a company of volunteers for the Creek War and fought in the Battle of Horseshoe Bend. According to tradition, Wood met Sam Houston and Edward Burleson during the campaign.

Wood operated a successful dry goods business based in Cuthbert. During a buying trip in 1837, he met a young widow named Martha Evans Gindrat, daughter of Jesse and Elizabeth (Fitzpatrick) Evans, during a stop in Milledgeville, Georgia. The two married on September 18, 1837. The marriage produced two children in addition to the three Martha brought from her previous marriage. Beyond his business interests, Wood was a member of the Georgia General Assembly from 1837 to 1838.

== Texas ==
In 1839, Wood and his family moved to the Republic of Texas. After exploring the Brazos, Colorado and Trinity rivers, he selected a site near the present-day town of Point Blank in Liberty County (now in San Jacinto County). At this site he quickly built a prosperous plantation.

Wood was elected to the Congress of the Republic of Texas in 1841, representing Liberty County in the House of Representatives. In 1845, during the annexation of Texas by the United States, he represented his home county during the convention which wrote the state constitution Wood was elected to the Texas Senate following Texas's admission to the United States. When the Mexican–American War began, he resigned his senate seat and became Colonel of the Second Regiment Texas Mounted Volunteers. During his service he was present for the capture of Monterrey.

== Governorship ==
The 1847 decision of Governor James Pinckney Henderson not to seek another term left a wide-open race for his replacement. A race dominated by five candidates developed with the key issue being how to deal with the public debt. About a month before the election, one of the candidates, Isaac Van Zandt, died of yellow fever. Most of Van Zandt's support shifted to Wood. As a result, he won the election with 7,154 votes compared to second-place finisher James B. Miller with 5,106.

When the governor took office, Texas had US$5,500,000 in outstanding bonds with no apparent means to repay the debt. To deal with the public debt, he advocated a plan to sell state land to the U.S. Federal government. The Texas Legislature did not support this plan and, after negotiations with Wood, passed a bill calling for the state Accountant and comptroller to determine the exact amount of debt before a method of payment was determined.

The Wood administration also saw an intensification of a dispute over the status of New Mexico. Texas considered New Mexico part of its territory, but the U.S. government did not recognize the claim. To strengthen its claim, the Texas Legislature created Santa Fe County and the eleventh judicial district. When the judge appointed to preside over the new district arrived in Santa Fe, he found U.S. Army soldiers already in the city who were determined to support the federal position.

Other issues Wood dealt with were organizing towns and counties, establishing court buildings, and reforming government operations. To defend the state's western frontier, a request was sent to Congress asking for a string of forts to be constructed. Reapportionment of the state was the most contested issue to arise during Wood's term. The coastal and central sections of the state, fearing loss of representation, opposed the proposal, while the northeastern section supported the effort. Despite the opposition, a reapportionment bill was passed by the legislature.

On February 21, 1848, Wood presided over the Texas Democratic convention, the first true political convention held in the state. This was followed by an 1849 effort to win a second term. The primary challenger to the governor was Peter H. Bell, who ran on the issues of frontier defense and the New Mexico dispute. Wood strongly defended his positions but was defeated by a margin of 10,319 votes to 8,754.

== Later life ==
After leaving office, Wood returned to his farm. In addition to his plantation, he established a mercantile business in Galveston. He made unsuccessful runs to be elected Governor in 1853 and 1855. He died at his home on September 3, 1858.

Texas Senate
Preceded by None	Texas State Senator from District 7; 1846–1847	Succeeded by William C. Abbott
Political offices
Preceded by James Pinckney Henderson	Governor of Texas; 1847–1849	Succeeded by Peter Hansborough Bell
