= William C. Abbott =

American lawyer and politician

William C. Abbott was an American politician born circa 1817. He worked as a lawyer in Maryland. He later moved to Texas. After George Tyler Wood resigned the District 7 seat in the Texas Senate, Abbott was elected to office, but never took the seat during the First Texas Legislature. Abbott was sworn in on December 14, 1847 and remained in office until November 5, 1849. He died in Liberty, Texas, on September 16, 1863.
