= Albert Clinton Horton =

American politician (1798–1965)

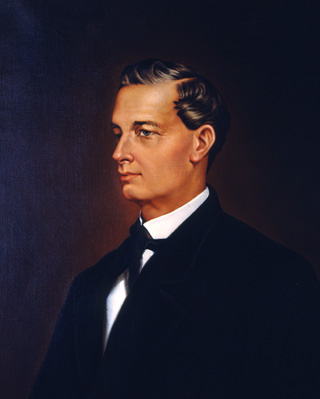

1st Lieutenant Governor of Texas
- In office May 2, 1846 – December 21, 1847
- Governor: James Pinckney Henderson
- Preceded by: Office established
- Succeeded by: John Alexander Greer

Member of the Alabama House of Representatives
- In office 1829–1830
- In office 1833–1834

Personal details
- Born: September 4, 1798 Hancock County, Georgia, U.S.
- Died: September 1, 1865 (aged 66) Matagorda, Texas, U.S.
- Party: Democratic
- Profession: Politician

Albert Clinton Horton (September 4, 1798 – September 1, 1865) was an American politician who served as the first lieutenant governor of Texas from 1846 to 1847 under Governor J. Pinckney Henderson.

== Early life ==
Horton was born on September 4, 1798, in Hancock County, Georgia, to William and Mary Thomas Horton. William Horton died when Albert was young. His mother married Colonel Samuel Dent; they moved to Alabama in 1823. In 1829 Albert married Eliza Holliday. He was a representative in the Alabama House of Representatives from 1829 to 1830, and 1833 to 1834. He represented Greensboro district.

== Life in Texas ==
Albert Horton moved to Texas in April 1835. He was a supporter of the Texas Revolution. In 1835 he went back to Alabama to recruit volunteers for the Texas army.

Horton served as colonel of a cavalry unit during the revolution. In early March 1836, his company joined James Fannin's command in south Texas. He was sent by Fannin to gather carts and oxen at Victoria, Texas. Horton's scouts located Col. Juan Morales nearing Goliad with the Jiménez and San Luis battalions on March 17. The next day Horton was busy skirmishing with General José de Urrea's advance forces. On March 19, he was sent to examine the crossing of Coleto Creek. Upon hearing artillery fire, he returned to find that Fannin and his troops had been surrounded and possibly overrun, Horton and his men after assessing the situation turned and retreated towards Victoria, where reinforcements were expected to be located, an action that would shadow his political career. He served in the Texas Revolution until May 1, 1836.

After the Republic of Texas was founded in 1836, Horton was elected to the Congress of the Republic of Texas. He was a Senator in the First and Second congresses of the Republic of Texas from 1836–38. He represented Matagorda, Jackson, and Victoria counties. He wasn't successful in his bid for the vice presidency of the Republic of Texas in 1838. He was appointed by the Republic of Texas Congress to select a location for the capital of Texas in January 1839. He was as a delegate to the Convention of 1845.

In 1842, Horton would again serve as a military officer when he was recruited to serve as a captain against the invasion of Ráfael Vásquez on March 7.

== Lieutenant Governorship and later life ==
After Texas became a U.S. state in December 1845, Horton became its first Lieutenant Governor. He was declared the first Lieutenant Governor of Texas on May 1, 1846. He took office the next day.

Texas governor James Pinckney Henderson was absent from his duties to command Texas troops during the Mexican–American War. Horton served as acting governor from May 19, 1846, to November 13, 1846. After he left the lieutenant governor's office, he retired to private life. He attended the Democratic National Convention in Charleston, South Carolina, in 1860 and the state Secession Congress in 1861. Before the American Civil War, he owned over 150 slaves, and was considered one of the richest men in the state of Texas, but after the Civil War he lost most of his fortune. He was an original member of the board of trustees that founded Baylor University.

He died on September 1, 1865, in Matagorda, and was buried in Matagorda Cemetery located on South Gulf Road.

Political offices
New title State Admitted to Union	Lieutenant Governor of Texas; 1846-1847	Succeeded by John Alexander Greer
