= 1847 Texas gubernatorial election =

- November 1, 1847
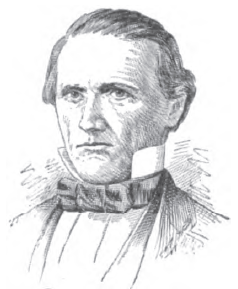

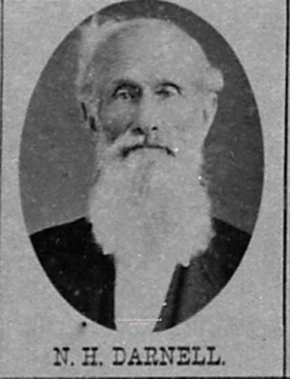
Nominee	George T. Wood	James B. Miller	Nicholas Henry Darnell
Party	Democratic	Whig	Democratic
Popular vote	7,154	5,106	1,276
Percentage	48.45%	34.58%	8.64%
- County results Wood: 40–50% 50–60% 60–70% 70–80% 80–90% >90% Miller: 40–50% 50–60% 60–70% 70–80% 80–90% >90% Darnell: 60–70% No Results
Governor before election
James Pinckney Henderson
Democratic
Elected Governor
George T. Wood
Democratic

The 1847 Texas gubernatorial election was held on November 1, 1847, to elect the governor of Texas. Incumbent Governor James Pinckney Henderson did not run for a second term. The election was won by George Tyler Wood, who received 49% of the vote.

== General election ==
=== Candidates ===
- Nicholas Henry Darnell, delegate at the 1845 statehood convention, former Speaker of the House of the Congress of the Texas Republic, member-elect of the Tennessee General Assembly former Speaker of the Republic of Texas House of Representatives (Democratic)
- James B. Miller, physician, unsuccessful candidate for governor in 1845, Secretary of the Treasury of the Republic of Texas, former chief justice of Fort Bend County, delegate at the Conventions of 1833 and 1845 (Whig)
- Jesse J. Robinson, state representative, former member of Congress of the Republic of Texas (Independent)
- George Tyler Wood, plantation owner, colonel in the Mexican American War, former state senator, former member of the Congress of the Republic of Texas, former member of the Georgia General Assembly (Democratic)

=== Results ===
1849 Texas gubernatorial election
Party	Candidate	Votes	%
Democratic	George Tyler Wood	7,154	48.45%
Whig	James B. Miller	5,106	34.58%
Democratic	Nicholas Henry Darnell	1,276	8.64%
Write-in		852	5.77%
Independent	Jesse J. Robinson	379	2.57%
Total votes		14,767	100.00%
Democratic hold			
