= 1849 Texas lieutenant gubernatorial election =

- August 6, 1849
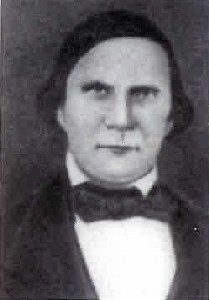

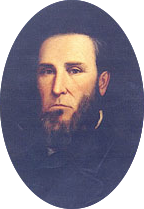

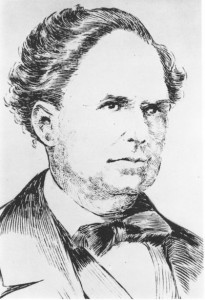
Nominee	John Alexander Greer	James W. Henderson	Middleton T. Johnson
Party	Democratic	Democratic	Democratic
Popular vote	10,599	6,981	1,289
Percentage	56.2%	37.0%	6.8%
Lieutenant Governor before election
John Alexander Greer
Democratic
Elected Lieutenant Governor
John Alexander Greer
Democratic

The 1849 Texas lieutenant gubernatorial election was held on August 6, 1849, in order to elect the lieutenant governor of Texas. The incumbent, Democrat John Alexander Greer, was reelected defeating candidates James W. Henderson and Middleton T. Johnson.

== General election ==
The incumbent lieutenant governor, John Alexander Greer did run for reelection. There had not been a strong partisan during the Republic period of Texas. The Democrats did have a strong presence within the state, as a result of the 1848 presidential election, but not all members of the political class had aligned themselves to the new party. Even if they did identify with a political party, candidates often ran independent campaigns.

=== Candidates ===
- John Alexander Greer, incumbent lieutenant governor
- James Wilson Henderson, surveyor, lawyer, Speaker of the Texas House of Representatives
- Middleton T. Johnson, Texas Ranger and militia leader, former representative in Alabama House of Representatives

=== Results ===
Texas lieutenant gubernatorial election, 1849
Party	Candidate	Votes	%
Democratic	John Alexander Greer (incumbent)	10,599	56.17
Democratic	James W. Henderson	6,981	37.00
Democratic	Middleton T. Johnson	1,289	6.83
Total votes		18,869	100.00
Democratic hold			
