= Anderson Hutchinson =

American judge (1798–1852)

Anderson Hutchinson (1798-January 21, 1853) was a justice of the Republic of Texas from 1841 to 1843.

Born in Greenbrier County, then in the state of Virginia (later in West Virginia), Hutchinson received an education in the common schools, and read law in the office of his father, who was clerk of the court for Greenbrier County. Hutchinson moved several times, first to Knoxville, Tennessee, where he gained admission to the bar, then to Huntsville, Alabama, and then to Raymond, Mississippi, where he "soon took a high position at the bar". He compiled "Hutchinson's Code", and a "Manual of Forms", before moving to the Republic of Texas in 1840, where he "was scarcely naturalized before he was elected to the supreme Bench of the Republic".

On the morning of September 11, 1842, while carrying out his duties as a Justice, Hutchinson was among a group of 58 people captured by Mexican forces in San Antonio. While imprisoned in Mexico, he "was forced to undergo many physical hardships", until he was released by the interposition of the United States government. He then returned to Mississippi "with a constitution greatly impaired by the exposures to which he was subjected", and formally resigned from the Texas court.

Hutchinson died at his home in Jackson, Mississippi.

Political offices
Preceded by John Hemphill	Justice of the Texas Supreme Court; 1841–1843	Succeeded by William Early Jones
