= 1849 Texas gubernatorial election =

- August 6, 1849
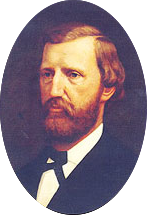

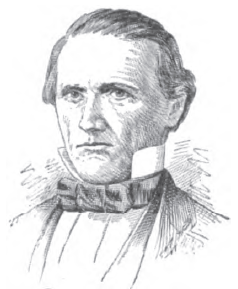

Nominee	Peter H. Bell	George T. Wood	John T. Mills
Party	Democratic	Democratic	Democratic
Popular vote	10,319	8,764	2,632
Percentage	47.52%	40.36%	12.12%
- County Results; Bell: 30–40% 40–50% 50–60% 60–70% 70–80% 80–90% Wood: 30–40% 50–60% 60–70% 70–80% 80–90% >90% Mills: 40–50% 50–60% 60–70% No Data
Governor before election
George T. Wood
Democratic
Elected Governor
Peter H. Bell
Democratic

The 1849 Texas gubernatorial election was held on August 6, 1849, to elect the governor of Texas. Incumbent Governor George Tyler Wood was running for reelection, but was defeated by Peter Hansborough Bell, winning 40% of the vote to Bell's 48%.

== General election ==
=== Candidates ===
- Peter Hansborough Bell, veteran of the Mexican-American War, former Texas Rangers captain, veteran of the Battle of San Jacinto (Democratic)
- John T. Mills, district judge of the Texas Supreme Court from Clarksville (Democratic)
- George Tyler Wood, incumbent governor, plantation owner, veteran of the Mexican-American War (Democratic)

=== Results ===
1849 Texas gubernatorial election
Party	Candidate	Votes	%
Democratic	Peter Hansborough Bell	10,319	47.52%
Democratic	George Tyler Wood (incumbent)	8,764	40.36%
Democratic	John T. Mills	2,632	12.12%
Total votes		21,715	100.00%
Democratic hold			
