= David S. Kaufman =

American politician (1813–1851)

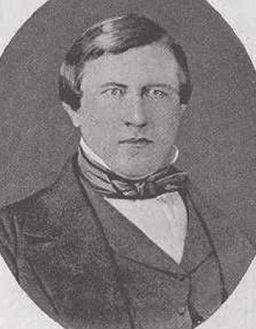

Member of the U.S. House of Representatives from Texas's 1st district
- In office March 30, 1846 – January 31, 1851
- Preceded by: Constituency established
- Succeeded by: Richardson A. Scurry

Republic of Texas Chargé d'affaires to the United States
- In office 1845–1846

Republic of Texas Senator
- In office 1843–1845

5th Speaker of the House (Republic of Texas)
- In office 1840–1841
- Preceded by: John M. Hansford
- Succeeded by: Kenneth L. Anderson

Member of the Republic of Texas House of Representatives from Nacogdoches County
- In office 1838–1841
- Preceded by: Thomas Jefferson Rusk

Personal details
- Born: David Spangler Kaufman; December 13, 1813 Boiling Springs, Pennsylvania, U.S.
- Died: January 31, 1851 (aged 37) Washington, D.C., U.S.
- Resting place: Texas State Cemetery
- Party: Democratic
- Spouse: Jane Baxter Richardson
- Children: Anna; Daniel; David Jr. Sam Houston
- Education: Princeton College
- Profession: Attorney

Military service
- Allegiance: Republic of Texas Army
- Rank: Aide to Gen. Thomas J. Rusk
- Battles/wars: Battle of the Neches

David Spangler Kaufman (December 18, 1813 – January 31, 1851) was an attorney, politician, and diplomat, serving as U.S. Representative from Texas. When the Republic of Texas was independent, he served in both houses of its legislature, and as chargé d'affaires of Texas to the United States.

== Early life and education ==
David Spangler Kaufman was born in Boiling Springs, Pennsylvania, the son of Mary (Spangler) and Abraham Landis Kaufman. He was of German-Jewish and Mennonite descent. His paternal great-grandfather was a Mennonite minister. Abraham was the son of John and Christianna (Landis) Kaufman; John was the son of Frederick Kaufman, a Mennonite minister. Frederick was the immigrant Kaufman ancestor, arriving in Philadelphia on September 21, 1742, at a time of strong German immigration to the colony. Kaufman pursued classical studies and was graduated from The College of New Jersey in 1833.

Kaufman moved to Natchez, Mississippi, where he studied law with John A. Quitman from New York. Kaufman was admitted to the bar in Natchez. He commenced practice in Natchitoches, Louisiana, in 1835. Attracted to the developing country in the Southwest, Kaufman moved in 1837 to Nacogdoches, Republic of Texas.

== Military service ==
Kaufman served in the military against the Cherokee people in the Texas-Indian Wars. He was wounded at the Battle of the Neches in 1839. These Cherokee had migrated to Texas from their territory in the American Southeast, to avoid being removed to Indian Territory, but the Texas president wanted to push them out of the republic.

== Political career ==
He served as a member of the Texas House of Representatives from 1838 to 1843. He served in the Texas Senate from 1843 to 1845. He was appointed chargé d'affaires of Texas to the United States in 1845.

Upon the admission of Texas as a state into the Union, Kaufman was elected as a Democrat to the 29th United States Congress. He was re-elected to the 30th and 31st Congresses, serving from March 30, 1846, until 1851. He served as chairman of the Committee on Rules (31st Congress).

== Death ==
Kaufman died from a heart attack in Washington, DC, on January 31, 1851, aged 37. Kaufman was originally interred in the Congressional Cemetery in Washington, DC. In 1932, his remains were moved and he was reinterred in the Texas State Cemetery at Austin.

== Fraternal memberships ==
- Freemasons
- The Philosophical Society of Texas

== Legacy and honors ==
Kaufman County, Texas is named for him, as is its seat, Kaufman.

== See also ==
- List of members of the United States Congress who died in office (1790–1899)

U.S. House of Representatives
New district	Member of the U.S. House of Representatives from Texas's 1st congressional district March 30, 1846 – January 31, 1851	Succeeded by Richardson A. Scurry
