= Oakwood Cemetery (Jefferson, Texas) =

Historic cemetery in Marion County, Texas

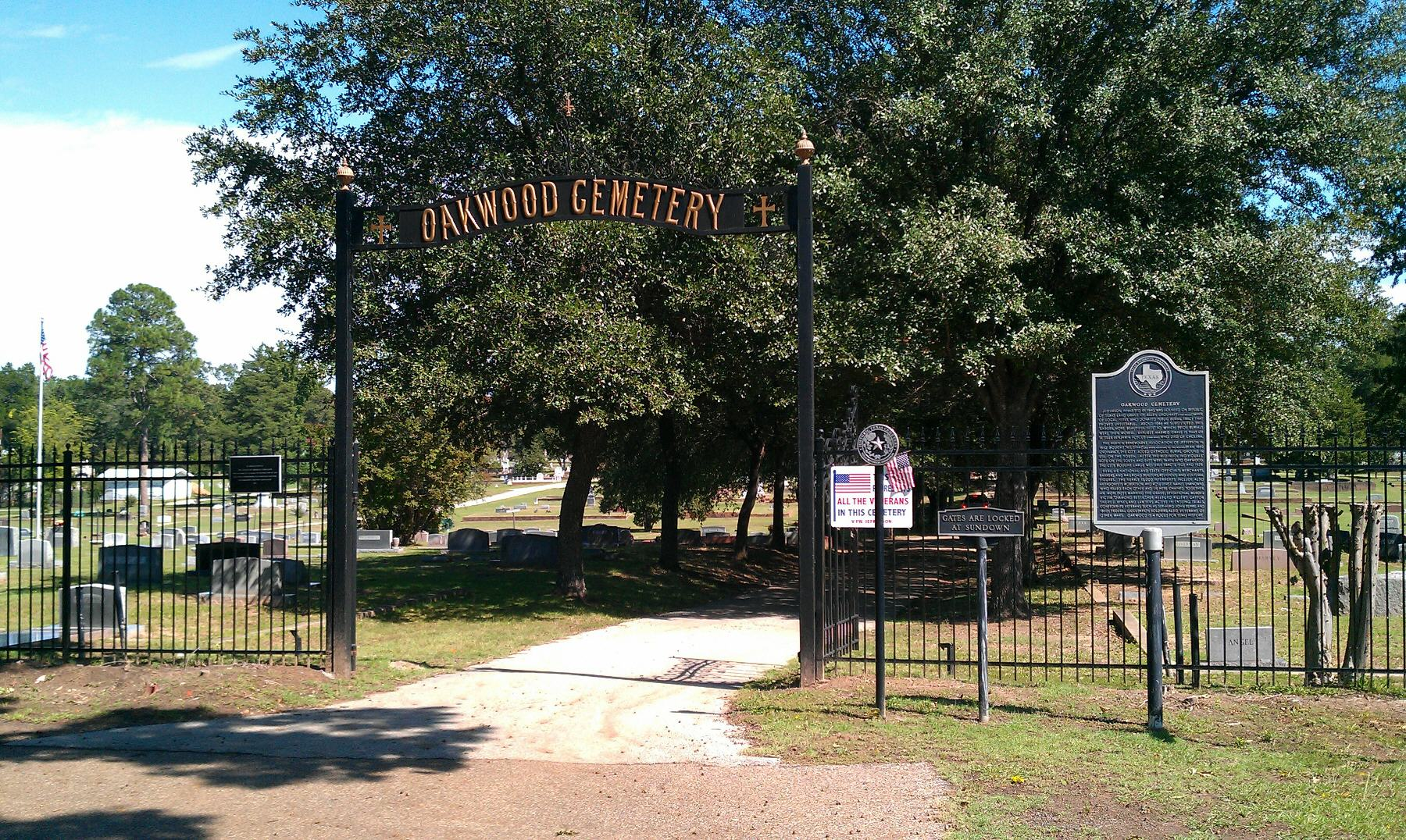
- Entrance to Oakwood Cemetery
- Interactive map of Oakwood Cemetery

Details
- Established: 1846
- Location: Jefferson, Texas
- Country: United States
- Coordinates: 32°46′00″N 94°20′55″W
- No. of interments: >3,000
- Find a Grave: Oakwood Cemetery

The Oakwood Cemetery is a historical cemetery located in Jefferson, Marion County, Northeast Texas.

== History ==
The earliest documentation of Jefferson indicates that burials were made in a public graveyard between Camp, Houston and Cypress streets along the Big Cypress Bayou in the 19th century.

The Cemetery Records of Marion County by DeWare and Payne, states, "In 1846, Allen Urquhart, the donor of a public burial tract for Jefferson, substituted a 'larger and more beautiful site' to which prior burials were then moved." It is unknown how many graves at the old site were moved to present-day Oakwood.

Burials apparently commenced at the new location; the oldest headstone in the cemetery standing today is that of Rev. Benjamin Foscue who died of cholera on January 1, 1850. In the spring of 1858, the minutes for the City of Jefferson indicate that attention was given to further planning at the cemetery. It is not called Oakwood, and there is no indication as to when that name was given.

In 1862, the Mt. Sinai Jewish Cemetery was purchased adjacent to the city cemetery. Today it is encompassed by Oakwood's main fence.

By 1872, city records clearly show the city cemetery in the present location of Oakwood. A Roman Catholic Section was added in 1880 by city ordinance.

Sections were added over the years as needed, and in 1972, a fence was placed around the perimeter of all of the sections, giving the cemetery the definitive look that it has today.

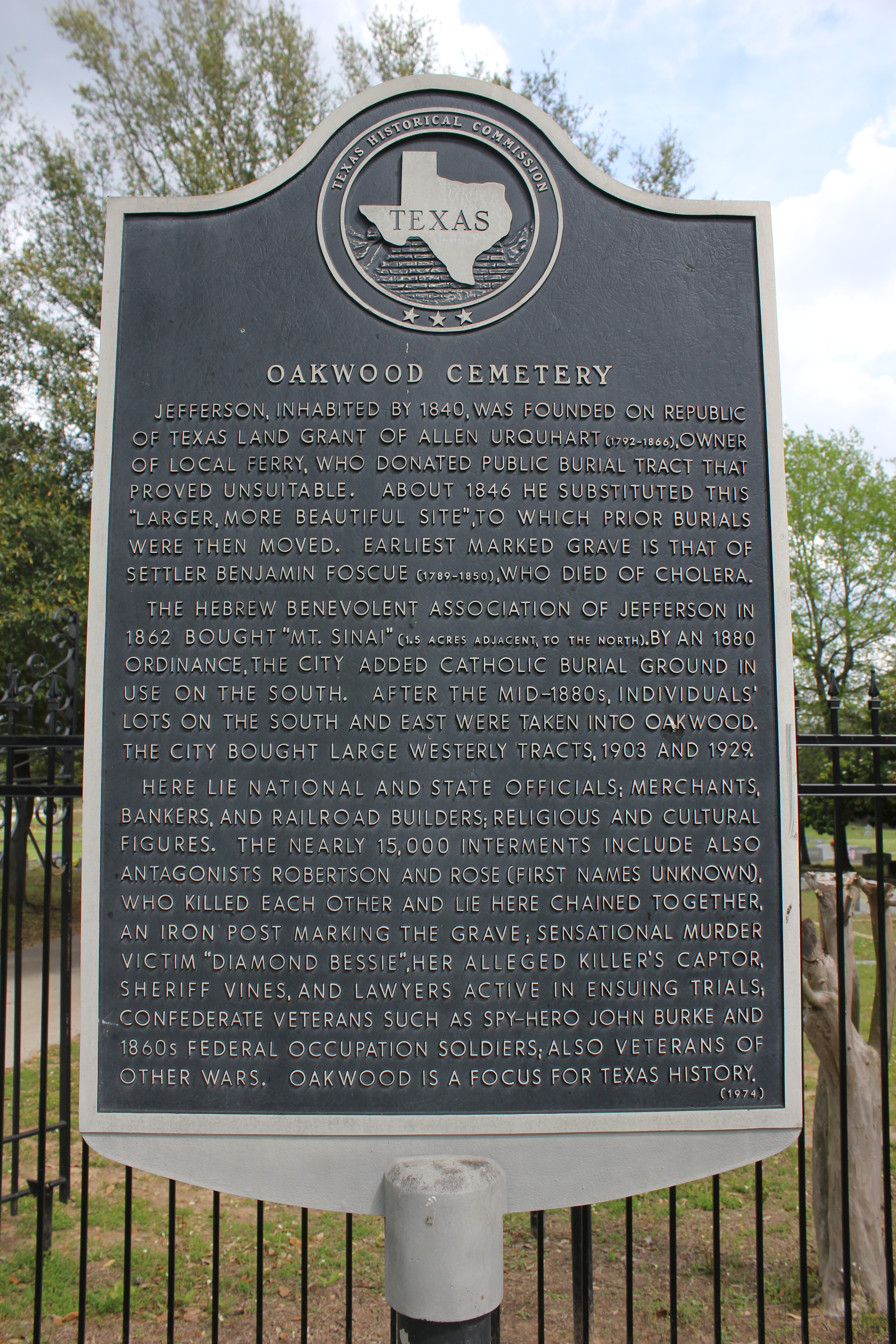
Texas Historical Marker at the Oakwood Cemetery.

=== Landmark designation ===
The Texas Historical Commission recognized Jefferson's Oakwood Cemetery as a Texas Historical Cemetery on November 10, 2004, designating it as cemetery MR-C011.

== Notable interments ==
- Cullen Montgomery Baker (1835–1869), wild west desperado
- David Culberson (1830–1900), Confederate Lt Colonel, Congressman from Texas
- Diamond Bessie (1853–1877), murder victim and local legend (a.k.a. Bessie Moore, née Annie Stone)
- Daniel J. Murphy (1843–1879), Civil War Medal of Honor recipient
- William Ochiltree (1811–1867), Representative in the Texas Legislature and Provisional Confederate Congress
- Richard Waterhouse (1832–1876), Confederate Brigadier General
