= Peter Hansborough Bell =

American military officer and politician (1810–1898)

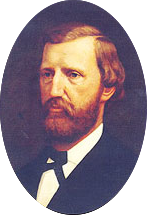

3rd Governor of Texas
- In office December 21, 1849 – November 23, 1853
- Lieutenant: John Alexander Greer; James W. Henderson
- Preceded by: George T. Wood
- Succeeded by: James W. Henderson

Member of the U.S. House of Representatives from Texas's 2nd district
- In office March 4, 1853 – March 3, 1857
- Preceded by: Volney E. Howard
- Succeeded by: Andrew J. Hamilton

Personal details
- Born: May 11, 1810 Culpeper County, Virginia, U.S.
- Died: March 8, 1898 (aged 87) Littleton, North Carolina, U.S.
- Party: Democratic
- Spouse: Ella Rives Eaton

Peter Hansborough Bell (May 11, 1810 (Note: Various sources give multiple dates in May 1810 and May 1812 for Bell's birth. Bell's gravestone uses a May 1812 date.) – March 8, 1898) was an American military officer and politician who served as the third governor of Texas from 1849 to 1853. A member of the Democratic Party, he was the U.S. representative for Texas's 2nd congressional district from 1853 to 1857.

Bell County in east central Texas is named after him.

== Background ==
Bell was born in Culpeper County, Virginia on May 11, 1810. He was educated in Virginia and Maryland before immigrating to Texas.

By March 1836, Bell was a member of the Texian Army under Sam Houston and was present at the Battle of San Jacinto. In 1841, as a member of Capt. John Coffee "Jack" Hays's Texas Rangers, he was involved in the Battle of Bandera Pass, strategically located as a pass separating the Guadalupe Valley and the Medina Valley. His military service was distinguished and General Houston appointed him to the general's staff as adjutant general. By 1839, Bell had been promoted to inspector general for the Republic of Texas's army.

In 1845, Bell was named a captain of the Texas Rangers. Given command of the Corpus Christi district, he protected the primary trade route between Texas and Mexico from outlaws. With the outbreak of the Mexican–American War, Bell became a lieutenant colonel in the Second Regiment Texas Mounted Volunteers. His actions during the Battle of Buena Vista were particularly distinguished. Following the war, he returned to the Rangers and served along the western frontier.

== Governorship ==
During the 1849 Texas gubernatorial election, Bell ran on a platform advocating strong frontier defense and support of Texas's territorial claim to New Mexico. To this end, he called for expending additional resources to eradicate the Native American population and sending troops to Santa Fe in support of Texas's claim to Santa Fe County. This platform allowed him to defeat incumbent Governor George T. Wood by a vote of 10,319 to 8,754.

Shortly after Bell's December 1849 inauguration at age 39, the Texas Legislature created three new counties from the southern section of Santa Fe County. The governor sent Robert Neighbors to oversee the organization of the new counties. Neighbors found that the inhabitants of the new counties were hostile to Texas interests and that residents of Santa Fe had written their own constitution.

After Neighbors's report became public in June 1850, Governor Bell, aged 40, called a special session of the legislature to deal with these developments. The session was held in August, and Bell's plans were to send the Texas Militia to seize control of Santa Fe from the United States government. The issue was resolved several months later in the Compromise of 1850; Bell signed Texas's acceptance legislation on November 25, 1850.

Bell won re-election in 1851, largely thanks to his aggressive policies and his being the most Southern of the five candidates. Highlights of his second term were payment of Texas's public debt and resolution of land-claim disputes between empresarios and their colonists. Bell left the governorship before the end of his term to take a seat in the United States Congress.

== Later life ==
Beginning in 1853, Bell represented Texas's western district in the U.S. House of Representatives for two terms. During this time, he became friends with United States Secretary of War Jefferson Davis. He also met and married Ella Rives Eaton of North Carolina. After his marriage, Bell never returned to Texas during his lifetime.

Following his 1857 marriage, Bell and his wife settled in Littleton, North Carolina. When the American Civil War began, he raised and paid to equip a regiment with his personal funds. He then served as the regiment's colonel.

Having grown wealthy and living "in lordly style" from his ownership of over 500 slaves, he was "impoverished" when the Union freed them after the Civil War. After the Texas Legislature learned this, they awarded the former governor an annual pension of US$150 and 1,280 acres (5.2 km^{2}). in the Fishing Creek Township of Granville County NC, which would later be known as Bryan's Hill (located on Jefferson Davis Highway between Oxford and Creedmoor NC). Bell died in Littleton on March 8, 1898, at the age of 87. His body was reburied with honors in Austin, Texas, in 1929.

Bell County, Texas is named after him.

== Works cited ==
- Coyner, C. Luther (1899). "Peter Hansborough Bell". The Quarterly of the Texas State Historical Association. 3 (1). Texas State Historical Association: 49–53. JSTOR 30242699.
- Hendrickson, Kenneth E. Jr. (1995). Chief executives of Texas: from Stephen F. Austin to John B. Connally, Jr. College Station: Texas A&M University Press. ISBN 0-89096-641-9.
- White, James T. (1899). The National Cyclopædia of American Biography. Vol. IX. New York: James T. White & Co. OCLC 1759175.

Political offices
Preceded by George T. Wood	Governor of Texas; 1849-1853	Succeeded by J. W. Henderson
U.S. House of Representatives
Preceded by Volney E. Howard	Member of the U.S. House of Representatives from Texas's 2nd congressional district 1853–1857	Succeeded by Guy M. Bryan
