= Milford Phillips Norton =

American judge (1794–1860)

Milford Phillips Norton (January 23, 1794 – June 8, 1860) was a justice of the Supreme Court of the Republic of Texas from 1845 to 1846.

Political offices
Preceded by Patrick C. Jack	Justice of the Texas Supreme Court; 1845–1846	Succeeded by Court dissolved
