= Richardson A. Scurry =

American politician and judge

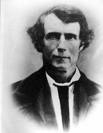
- Richardson A. Scurry, US Representative from Texas

Member of the U.S. House of Representatives from Texas's 1st district
- In office August 4, 1851 – March 3, 1853
- Preceded by: David S. Kaufman
- Succeeded by: George W. Smyth

8th Speaker of the House (Republic of Texas)
- In office 1843–1844
- Preceded by: Nicholas Henry Darnell
- Succeeded by: John M. Lewis

Personal details
- Born: Richardson A. Scurry; November 11, 1811 Gallatin, Tennessee, U.S.
- Died: April 9, 1862 (aged 50) Hempstead, Texas, U.S.
- Resting place: Hempstead Cemetery, Hempstead, Texas
- Party: Democratic

Richardson A. Scurry (November 11, 1811 – April 9, 1862) was a Texas politician and a Democratic member of the United States House of Representatives.

== Biography ==
Richardson A. Scurry was born in Gallatin, Tennessee on November 11, 1811, a son of Thomas J. and Catherine (Bledsoe) Scurry. The eldest of five children, he was educated by private tutors, then studied law with a relative, Judge Josephus Conn Guild. In 1830, Scurry was admitted to the bar and began practice in Covington, Tennessee.

Scurry moved to Texas early in 1836 and joined the army of the Republic of Texas. He participated in the Battle of San Jacinto as first sergeant of the company commanded by Isaac N. Moreland. He was later commissioned as a first lieutenant, and served until resigning on October 4, 1836. After leaving the Texas army, Scurry settled in Clarksville, Texas, where he established a successful law practice.

When Texas organized its new government after winning independence from Mexico, Scurry was chosen to serve as secretary of the senate during the 1st Texas Congress, which met from October 2 to December 22, 1836. In December 1836, President Sam Houston appointed Scurry as district attorney of the First Judicial District. In January 1840 the Texas Congress elected him to serve as judge of the Sixth Judicial District, an appointment which also made him an associate justice of the Texas Supreme Court. He served until resigning in February 1841 to become district attorney of the Fifth Judicial District, an appointment he carried out while practicing law in San Augustine, Texas in partnership with his brother William, Thomas Jefferson Rusk, and James Pinckney Henderson. While living in San Augustine, Scurry served in a militia company commanded by Rusk which took part in the Texas–Indian wars.

Scurry was a member of the Texas House of Representatives during the 7th and 8th Congresses (1842–1844). During the 8th Congress, Scurry served as Speaker of the House. Texas was admitted to the Union in 1845. In 1851, Scurry was elected to the United States House of Representatives as a Democrat in a special election to fill the vacancy caused by the death of David S. Kaufman. He served the remainder of Kaufman's term in the 32nd Congress, August 4, 1851 to March 3, 1853. He did not run for reelection to a full term and resumed practicing law near Hempstead, Texas.

In August 1854 Scurry accidentally lost part of his foot after he shot himself while hunting, and a doctor partially amputated the rest. Scurry was left mostly invalid, and suffered complications from the wound for the rest of his life. Scurry supported the Confederacy during the American Civil War, and in 1861 was commissioned as a colonel in the Confederate States Army with orders to raise a regiment. His physical limitations prevented him from carrying out this duty. Instead, he contacted a friend, General Albert Sidney Johnston, the commander of the Confederate States Army's Western Department, who appointed Scurry as an adjutant on his staff.

== Death and burial ==
In 1862, Scurry underwent surgery to amputate his leg, hoping to become mobile enough with crutches to serve under Johnston. He died from surgical complications at his Hempstead home on April 3, 1862. Scurry was buried at Hempstead Cemetery in Hempstead.

== Family ==
In 1843, Scurry married Evantha Foster of Waller County. They were the parents of nine children, four of whom lived to adulthood. Scurry's son Thomas (1859–1911) served as adjutant general of the Texas National Guard.

Scurry's siblings included William Read Scurry (1821–1864), a general in the Confederate army.

Political offices
Preceded by Nicholas Henry Darnell	Speaker of the Republic of Texas House of Representatives; 1844	Succeeded by John M. Lewis
U.S. House of Representatives
Preceded by David S. Kaufman	Member of the U.S. House of Representatives from Texas's 1st congressional district 1851–1853	Succeeded by George W. Smyth
