= List of Supreme Court of Kenya cases =

The opinions delivered by the Supreme Court of Kenya since its inception are outlined below

== 2011 ==
=== Election Date ===
==== Decision ====
The Supreme Court declined to issue directions on the date of the next General Election and referred the matter to the High Court.

==== Judges ====
The ruling was read by Chief Justice Willy Mutunga on behalf of the full bench consisting of:

- Chief Justice Martha Koome
- Deputy Chief Justice Justice Philomena Mwilu
- Justice William Ouko
- Justice Mohammed Ibrahim
- Justice Njoki Ndung'u
- Justice Smokin Wanjala
- Justice Isaac Lenaola

== 2012 ==
=== Gender Representation ===
==== Decision ====
On 11 December 2012, the Supreme Court ruled that the one-third-gender rule for elective positions provided for by the Constitution would be implemented progressively up to 2015 and not applied in the March 4 General Election

==== Judges ====
The Ruling read by Justice Ojwang’ was made by:

- Chief Justice Willy Mutunga
- Justice Jackton Ojwang’
- Justice Philip Tunoi
- Justice Smokin Wanjala
- Justice Njoki Ndung’u

==== Dissent ====
Chief Justice Mutunga dissented, saying the ruling flew in the face of the struggle by Kenyan women for gender equality.

== 2021 ==
=== Mitu-Bell Welfare Society v KAA ===
Decision

The Supreme Court ruled that over 3000 families from Mitumba Village who had been forcibly evicted from their homes had a right to housing under the Kenyan Constitution.

Judges

The Ruling was made by:

- Chief Justice David Maraga
- Deputy Chief Justice Philomena Mwilu
- Justice M.K. Ibrahim
- Justice S.C. Wanjala
- Justice Njoki Ndungu
