= American unionism =

Ideology for preserving American federal government

Abraham Lincoln, the 16th president of the United States, was a key figure in the legitimacy and preservation of the Union

American unionism, is an ideology on the preservation of the legitimacy of American federal government encompassing all states and opposition to individual secession. American unionism has historically been existent during the American Civil War period and Reconstruction period of American history, but has also been affirmed by Supreme Court of the United States decisions, such as Texas v. White. Unionism in the United States arose primarily from the attitudes following Lincoln–Douglas debates, particularly Abraham Lincoln's House Divided speech.

== Ideology ==
Henry Clay, the 9th United States Secretary of State and Senator from Kentucky, stated in a speech on the preservation of the Union

The Honorable Senator speaks of Virginia being my country. This Union is my country. The thirty states is my country. Kentucky is my country. And Virginia no more than any of the other states of this Union. She has created on my part obligations and feelings and duties toward her in my private character which nothing upon earth could induce me to forfeit or violate. But even if it were my own state—if my own state, contrary to her duty, should raise the standard of disunion against the residue of the Union, I would go against her, I would go against Kentucky in that contingency as much as I love her.

Similar sentiments would later be applied in speeches and transcripts by Abraham Lincoln, 16th president of the United States, such as the Gettysburg Address and Letter to Horace Greeley.

The core idea of American unionism is the preservation and legitimacy of the Union, better referred to as the U.S. federal government. It values federalism and the justification of statehood in the federal system.

== History ==
=== Early history of the United States ===
On July 4, 1776, the Declaration of Independence, authored by the Committee of Five, which includes figures Thomas Jefferson, John Adams, Benjamin Franklin, Robert Livingston, and Roger Sherman, would be unanimously adopted by all 56 delegates to the Second Continental Congress. This would include all thirteen British colonies forming the United States. An alliance between all former colonies, now under republican government, would agree upon the Articles of Confederation, being the first constitution of the United States. Despite the eventual end of the Revolutionary War, the Articles of Confederation would maintain its legitimate status up until Shays's Rebellion, which displayed the weakness of the U.S. government under the boundaries of the Articles of Confederation. Through the work of the Annapolis Convention in 1786 and the Constitutional Convention in 1787, delegates would introduce the first few drafts of the Constitution. Despite this, anti-Federalists, individuals who opposed the adoption of the Constitution, stated there was a lack of bill of rights, thus giving the government far too much power. This would lead to said bill of rights being included as the first ten amendments in the Constitution. The Constitution would be adopted on March 4, 1789.

=== Preservation of the Union and the Civil War ===
In a speech from Henry Clay, 9th United States Secretary of State, during the introduction of the laws included in the Compromise of 1850, Clay would state his love for the Union, the utmost desire for the legitimacy and maintenance of power of said Union. This idea of the preservation of the Union's legitimacy and power would be similarly represented in Abraham Lincoln's House Divided Speech. Despite this, the legitimacy and strength of the United States federal government would be challenged with the secession of numerous southern slave states, forming the Confederate States of America.

In a letter to Horace Greeley, Abraham Lincoln would say

I would save the Union. I would save it the shortest way under the Constitution. The sooner the national authority can be restored; the nearer the Union will be "the Union as it was." If there be those who would not save the Union, unless they could at the same time save slavery, I do not agree with them. If there be those who would not save the Union unless they could at the same time destroy slavery, I do not agree with them. My paramount object in this struggle is to save the Union, and is not either to save or to destroy slavery. If I could save the Union without freeing any slave I would do it, and if I could save it by freeing all the slaves I would do it; and if I could save it by freeing some and leaving others alone I would also do that. What I do about slavery, and the colored race, I do because I believe it helps to save the Union; and what I forbear, I forbear because I do not believe it would help to save the Union. I shall do less whenever I shall believe what I am doing hurts the cause, and I shall do more whenever I shall believe doing more will help the cause. I shall try to correct errors when shown to be errors; and I shall adopt new views so fast as they shall appear to be true views. I have here stated my purpose according to my view of official duty; and I intend no modification of my oft-expressed personal wish that all men every where could be free.

Similarly, following the Battle of Gettysburg and remarks of Edward Everett, Abraham Lincoln would deliver the Gettysburg Address to Union soldiers. In said address, Abraham Lincoln would look towards the creation of a new nation, with a new birth of freedom, with it being a government by the people, of the people.

The Union would go on to win the Civil War after the Battle of Appomattox Court House, ending in the surrender of the entire Confederate army in Northern Virginia under the command of Robert E. Lee.

== Ideas ==
=== Federalism ===
One of the core ideas of American unionism, and generally American government, is federalism. Federalism would first be advocated for after Shays's Rebellion, but particularly concurrent of and after the publishing of the Federalist Papers. It would be a core idea in the construction of the U.S. Constitution and the modern understanding of separation of powers.

=== Patriotism ===
Patriotism is a core aspect of American government and general American living. American unionism is an expression of said patriotism via the desire for the preservation of American governmental legitimacy and strength.

== See also ==
- Federal government of the United States
- Americanism, or American patriotism
- American nationalism
