= George Whitfield Terrell =

American judge

George Whitfield Terrell (c. 1803 – 1846) was an attorney general, judge, and diplomat in the Republic of Texas.

Terrell was born in Kentucky in about 1803. His father was James Terrell. His family moved to Tennessee when he was a child. He studied law and was admitted to the bar in 1827.

Terrell became Attorney General (equivalent to a district attorney) for the Thirteenth District of Tennessee in 1829 and served until 1836. Some sources state that he was appointed to this position by then Governor Sam Houston. Another states that he was elected by the Tennessee legislature.

Terrell moved to Mississippi in 1837 where he experienced financial problems, shortly afterward moving to the Texas republic for a fresh start. In 1840 he was appointed as a district attorney by then President Mirabeau Lamar, Sam Houston's rival, but declined to accept his offer to become Secretary of State. Upon his re-election to the Texas Presidency in late 1841, Houston appointed him Attorney General.

From 1840 to 1842, Terrell was District Judge for the Fifth District, which office also served as an associate justice of the Supreme Court of the Republic of Texas.

In 1843m Terrell, along with Edward H. Tarrant, negotiated the Treaty of Bird's Fort with nine tribes of Native Americans.

Terrell also served as a diplomat, representing Texas interests to the nations of France, Great Britain, and Spain.

Terrell was an opponent of annexation by the United States.

Terrell knew Andrew Jackson and in 1842 gave the former U.S. President the gift of a pipe carved from a stone from the Alamo. This pipe is now in the collection of the Hermitage Museum.

Terrell died in 1846 in Austin, Texas and was buried in Oakwood Cemetery.

Political offices
Preceded by Edward Thomas Branch	Justice of the Texas Supreme Court; 1840–1842	Succeeded by John M. Hansford
