= James Webb (Texas politician) =

American politician (1792–1856)

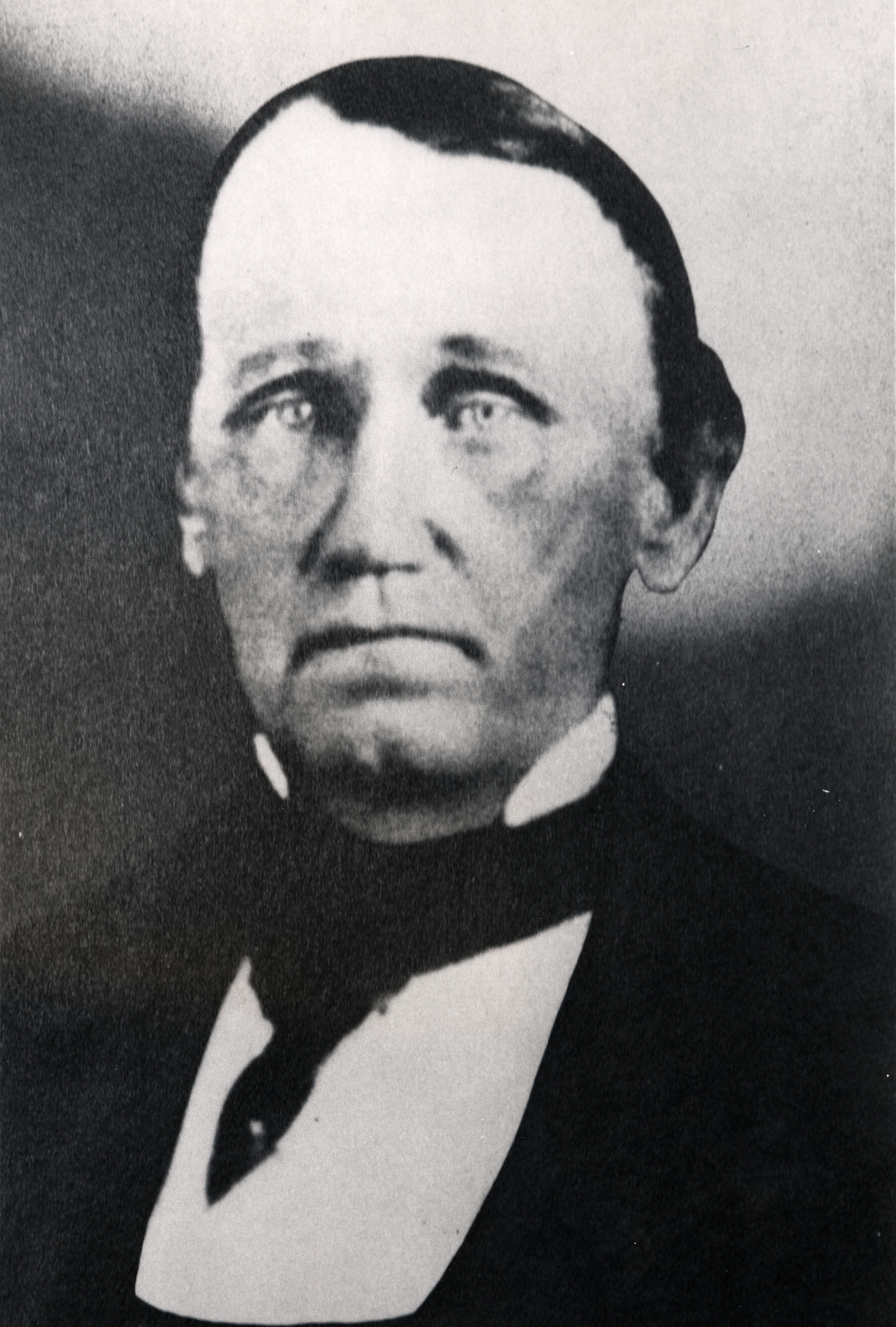
- Born: March 31, 1792; Fairfax County, Virginia, US
- Died: November 1 1856; Corpus Christi, Texas, US
- Occupations: Attorney, judge, politician
- Years active: 1816-1856

James Webb (1792–1856) was an attorney, judge, and politician in the Republic of Texas and during the early days of statehood after its annexation by the United States. Webb was born in Virginia in 1792 and spent part of his early years in Georgia and Florida. He taught school as a teenager, worked in the office of the county clerk and studied for the bar. He became an attorney in 1816.

He moved back to Florida in 1823 where he established the community of Webbville in Jackson County. He served as one of the trustees of the first public school in the area, Webbville Academy. In 1828 he was named a federal judge for the newly created Southern District of Florida by President John Quincy Adams.

In 1838, he moved to Texas where he caught the attention of President Mirabeau Lamar, who made him Secretary of State, Secretary of Treasury, and Attorney General of the young republic. In 1841 he was named minister to Mexico. He attempted to establish diplomatic relations during this time, but was unsuccessful. Returning promptly to Texas, he served for three years in the Republic of Texas Senate (1841-1844).

He served again as Secretary of State after statehood. In 1854, Webb was appointed judge of the Texas Fourteenth Judicial Circuit Court, based in Corpus Christi, his new home. He was still serving when he died on November 1, 1856, en route to Goliad, Texas, for a court session. He was buried in Oak Hill Cemetery, Goliad.

Webb County, Texas is named in his honor.

== Early life ==
James Webb was born to Francis Webb and Frances (née Walker) Webb in Fairfax County, Virginia, on March 31, 1792. In 1810, the family moved to Janes County, Georgia, then to Hancock County, where the father died. At age 17, James went to work teaching school for one year, then moved to Essex County, Virginia, where he was hired to work in the county clerk's office. During this time he began "reading law," a prerequisite for becoming a lawyer in lieu of attending law school. He served a tour of duty in the War of 1812, then resumed his studies and was admitted to the Virginia bar in 1819.

== Life in Florida ==
In 1823, James Webb moved his residence and law practice from Georgia to Jackson County, Florida. He had already married Rachel Elizabeth Lamar, and they were expecting a second child. (Note: The first child was a 10-year old daughter named Mary Elizabeth. The mother and daughter decided to live with Rachel's family until James obtained land and built a house for them.) In time, she bore a son, Thomas Francis Webb. Rachel and her two children traveled south to reunite the family in 1824. In 1825, the Webb family welcomed a second son, James William.

There were few attorneys in the Florida Panhandle, so James claimed about 400 acres (1.6 km^{2}) of land near a community known only as Chipola Settlement. He opened a law office in Chipola, and soon took on Peter W. Gautier, already a prominent figure in Florida, as his partner. Chipola had become established only a year before Webb arrived, and the area was already attracting many settlers. Chipola Settlement grew from fewer than 200 inhabitants in 1822 to more than 2000 in 1825. The land was well watered by several creeks and rivers, and soon proved highly suitable for agriculture, especially for raising either cotton or sugar. The Florida Territorial Legislature appointed a commission in 1827 to choose a final site for the county seat, survey it, and begin selling lots. James Webb was selected as one of the commissioners. Webbville Academy, Jackson County's first public school, was established in the new town in 1827. James Webb was named as one of the trustees.

The commission selected an unnamed village as the temporary county seat. It happened that the village also contained Webb's law office and a general store owned by Colonel L. M. Stone. The legislative council also decreed that the Jackson County courts would meet henceforth at Stone's Store. A year earlier, Stone's place had been established as the site of a U.S. Post Office. In February 1827, an advertisement in the Pensacola, Florida newspaper announced that the village had been named Webbville, Florida.

The U.S. Congress approved creation of a Federal superior court for the Southern District of Florida on May 23, 1828. President John Quincy Adams signed the Act and, three days later, Webb was the new district's first judge. He accepted the appointment, resigned his Jackson County seat in the Territorial Legislature, put his farm up for sale and prepared to move to Key West, the seat of the new court. Hardly had he left Webbville when a rival group from Marianna, Florida announced its intention to move the proposed county seat to Marianna, quickly swinging into action, lining up political support, even as Webbville businesses were moving to Marianna. Dissident members of the Territorial Legislature pushed forward an act threatening fines for any officials who failed to conduct their official business from Marianna. County officials scrambled to relocate their offices to the de facto county seat. Webbville became the county's first incorporated town on November 19, 1828, but it was a hollow victory. The reality was that effectively moving the county seat to Marianna ended the rise of Webbville. The buildings were soon scavenged to erect buildings in Marianna and elsewhere. Before the outbreak of the American Civil War, Webbville had become a ghost town.

Powerless to alter the events dismantling the town named for him, James Webb continued to work and live in Key West. He and Rachel welcomed a fourth child, Charles John Webb. Webb's term of office would expire in 1838. He then resigned his post and moved to Houston, already a booming port in the Republic of Texas.

== Gone to Texas ==
The President of the Republic of Texas, Mirabeau B. Lamar was related to Webb's wife through the Lamar family. Apparently he had heard through the family grapevine that a very talented relative was coming to Texas and would be available for work. Lamar sent word requesting Webb to come quickly to Austin, the capital of the new republic. Lamar needed a new Secretary of State. Webb agreed to take the position, effective November 18, 1839. He remained there for nearly two years before President Lamar asked him to serve as full-time Minister to Mexico, beginning March 20, 1841. Mexico had no desire to negotiate anything and refused to accept Webb. Unable to accomplish anything, Webb returned to Austin, where he became a member of the Texas Senate, representing the Travis-Bastrop-Fayette-Gonzales district from 1841 to 1844, and serving as chairman of the Judiciary Committee and as a member of the Foreign Relations Committee.

President Lamar's term ended in 1841, so Webb opened a private law practice in Texas. Williamson S. Oldham, a former speaker of the Arkansas House of Representatives and onetime Associate Justice on the Arkansas Supreme Court, joined Webb's office as partner. Oldham was a member of the Convention of 1845 that cleared the way for Texas to become part of the United States, so he was already well known across the state.

== Post statehood in Texas ==
After Texas became a state in 1845, Webb became a reporter for the state supreme court. He and Thomas H. Duval collaborated to produce the first three volumes of Texas Reports. (Note: Duval was the son of Florida's former governor, William P. Duval, who was also the namesake of Duval County, Texas.) In 1849, Webb was appointed Secretary of the State by the newly elected third governor of the state, Peter Hansborough Bell. He served until he resigned in 1851 and moved his residence to Corpus Christi, Texas.

In 1854, Webb was appointed judge of the Texas Fourteenth Judicial Circuit Court. He was still serving when he died en route to Goliad for a court session November 1, 1856. He was buried in Oak Hill Cemetery, Goliad, Texas.

== Legacy ==
- Webb County, Texas, formed from Nueces County, Texas, was named to honor James Webb for his services to both the Republic of Texas and the modern State of Texas.

== Notes ==
Political offices
Preceded by Washington D. Miller	Secretary of State of Texas; 1850-1851	Succeeded by Thomas H. Duval
