= John Alexander Greer =

American politician (1802–1855)

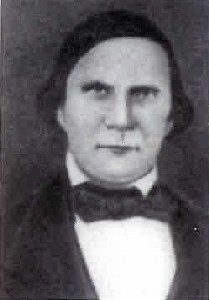

2nd Lieutenant Governor of Texas
- In office December 21, 1847 – December 22, 1851
- Governor: George Tyler Wood; Peter Hansborough Bell
- Preceded by: Albert Clinton Horton
- Succeeded by: James W. Henderson

12th Secretary of Treasury of the Republic of Texas
- In office July 1845 – 1846
- President: Anson Jones
- Preceded by: William Beck Ochiltree
- Succeeded by: Office abolished

President pro tempore of the Republic of Texas Senate
- In office November 1, 1841 – June 28, 1845
- Preceded by: Anson Jones
- Succeeded by: Legislature abolished

Republic of Texas Senator from San Augustine
- In office April 9, 1838 – June 28, 1845
- Preceded by: Henry William Augustine
- Succeeded by: Legislature abolished

Personal details
- Born: July 18, 1802 Shelbyville, Tennessee, U.S.
- Died: July 4, 1855 (aged 52) San Augustine, Texas, U.S.
- Resting place: Greer Cemetery, Ironosa, Texas, U.S. or Texas State Cemetery, Austin, Texas, U.S.
- Party: Democratic
- Spouse: Adeline Minerva Orten (m. 1836; died 1843)

John Alexander Greer (July 18, 1802 – July 4, 1855) was an American politician who served as the second lieutenant governor of Texas from 1847 to 1851 under Governors George T. Wood and Peter H. Bell. He was also the twelfth and final Secretary of Treasury of the Republic of Texas during Anson Jones' presidency. Greer County, Oklahoma, once claimed by Texas, is named in his honor.

== Biography ==
Greer was born at Shelbyville, Tennessee, on July 18, 1802 to Thomas and Catherine Rebecca (née Harman) Greer. He lived in Kentucky before moving to Texas in 1830. On May 18, 1836, Greer married Adeline Minerva Orten. She died on August 26, 1843, in San Augustine, Texas.

He represented San Augustine as a senator in the Congress of the Republic of Texas from 1838 to 1845, from the second to the ninth Congress. He was the president pro tempore of the Senate from 1841 to 1845. He was made the Grand Master of the Grand Lodge of the Republic of Texas in 1842. Anson Jones, the last president of the Republic of Texas, appointed him as secretary of the treasury in July 1845. After Texas was annexed into the United States, Greer became the second Lieutenant Governor of Texas in 1847. Greer attained the rank of Deputy Grand High Priest in the Grand Royal Arch Chapter of the state in 1851. The same year, while serving as Lieutenant Governor, he challenged Peter H. Bell for the governorship in 1851. He was the president of an Austin convention to formally organize the Democratic party in Texas in January 1854. He died on July 4, 1855, after falling ill while campaigning for the governorship against the incumbent, Elisha M. Pease, four months before the election.

== Burial ==
John A. Greer was originally buried at his farm, located nine miles northwest of San Augustine. The area is in the community of Ironosa. He was buried in the Greer Cemetery, about 45 feet to the east from the chain link fence of the present African American Greer Cemetery.

According to the late Bob Bowman of Lufkin, the Texas Centennial Commission went to Jack Greer, grandson of John Alexander Greer's brother, in 1929 to speak to him about moving Greer's grave. After informing the men about his desire for Greer to remain in San Augustine County, the men later returned with a court order to exhume John Alexander Greer's grave. The men believed that Greer was buried in one of two graves but were unsure which one was correct. Jack Greer walked to one of the graves and told them "This is the one". He had pointed them to a well-known reprobate of San Augustine who happened to be buried nearby.

John Alexander Greer was reinterred in 1929 at the Texas State Cemetery in Austin, where his body might lie in the cemetery's Republic Hill (Section 2), Row S, No. 8.

== Legacy ==
John A. Greer is the namesake of Greer County, Oklahoma, established 5 years after his death in February 1860 as Greer County, Texas. Greer County was disputed between Texas and what is now Oklahoma. It was eventually decided to lie in the Territory of Oklahoma by the Supreme Court of the United States in the case, United States v. State of Texas 162 U.S. 1 (1896).

Political offices
Preceded by Albert C. Horton	Lieutenant Governor of Texas; 1847–1851	Succeeded by James W. Henderson
Preceded by William Beck Ochiltree	Secretary of Treasury of the Republic of Texas; 1845–1846	Succeeded by Office abolished
Preceded by Anson Jones	President pro tempore of the Republic of Texas Senate; 1841–1845	Succeeded by Legislature abolished
Preceded by Henry William Augustine	Republic of Texas Senator from San Augustine; 1838–1845	Succeeded by Legislature abolished
