= William B. Ochiltree =

American politician, lawyer, judge and military officer (1811–1867)

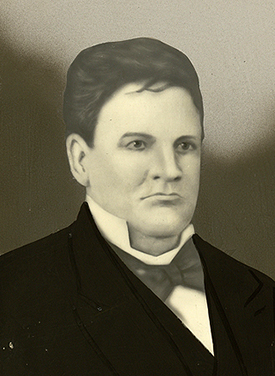
- Ochiltree in 1855

Deputy from Texas to the Provisional Congress of the Confederate States
- In office 1861–1862
- Preceded by: New constituency
- Succeeded by: Constituency abolished

Associate justice of the Supreme Court of the Republic of Texas
- In office January 3, 1842 – December 12, 1844
- Preceded by: George Whitfield Terrell
- Succeeded by: Royall T. Wheeler

Texas Secretary of Treasury
- In office December 1844 – ?
- Preceded by: George Whitfield Terrell
- Succeeded by: John Alexander Greer

Adjutant General of the Republic of Texas
- In office 1845

Texas Attorney General
- In office November 1845 – 1846
- Preceded by: Ebenezer Allen
- Succeeded by: Volney Howard

Member of the Texas House of Representatives from the 27th district
- In office November 5, 1855 – November 2, 1857 Serving with William Peck
- Preceded by: Beauford Warren Brown; David V. Muckleroy
- Succeeded by: Samuel Kirk; Harris Rhodes

Personal details
- Born: William Beck Ochiltree; October 18, 1811 Fayetteville, North Carolina, US
- Died: December 27, 1867 (aged 56) Jefferson, Texas, US
- Resting place: Oakwood Cemetery
- Party: Whig
- Relations: Lord Ochiltree
- Children: 9, including Thomas
- Occupation: Politician, lawyer, judge, military officer

Military service
- Allegiance: Republic of Texas; Confederate States of America
- Branch/service: Confederate States Army
- Rank: Colonel
- Unit: 18th Texas Infantry Regiment
- Battles/wars: American Civil War; Battle of Mansfield

William Beck Ochiltree (October 18, 1811 – December 27, 1867) was an American politician, lawyer, judge, and military officer. A Whig, he held various Texas statewide offices.

Born in North Carolina, Ochiltree moved to the Republic of Texas in 1829 and practiced law. Throughout his career, he was a justice in the Supreme Court of the Republic of Texas, Secretary of Treasury, Adjutant General of Texas, and Texas Attorney General. He was a member of the Provisional Congress of the Confederate States, resigning to fight in the American Civil War. He was the namesake of Ochiltree County.

== Early life and early career ==
Ochiltree was born on October 18, 1811, near Fayetteville, North Carolina, the son of David Ochiltree and Kezia (or Kosiah; née Beck) Ochiltree. Of Scottish ancestry, he was descendent of the family Lord Ochiltree. He received a limited education.

As a teenager, Ochiltree and his parents moved to the Florida Territory, and in 1830, to Alabama. In Alabama, he read law and began practicing. In 1839 or 1840, he moved to Nacogdoches, Texas, where he practiced law. He may have lived in Palestine for a time.

== Career ==
From January 3, 1842, to December 12, 1844, Ochiltree was an associate justice of the Supreme Court of the Republic of Texas, representing the 5th judicial district. In December 1844, he was appointed Secretary of Treasury by President Anson Jones. According to the Tarlton Law Library, of the University of Texas at Austin School of Law, he was Adjutant General of the Republic of Texas in 1845.

Ochiltree opposed Texas annexation, being a delegate to the 1845 annexation convention, where he helped draft the Constitution of Texas. In 1846 and 1847, he was first judge of Smith County, having been appointed by Governor J. Pinckney Henderson. He resigned to practice law privately. He and James Smith donated the land on which the city of Henderson was built, with it being named Henderson at their wish, in honor of Governor Henderson.

After Texas joined the United States, Ochiltree joined the Whig Party. From either early 1845 or November of the same year, to 1846, he was Texas Attorney General, being the last of the Republic of Texas to hold the office. In 1848, he was a Whig Party elector. He unsuccessfully ran for the United States House of Representatives in 1851, 1859, and 1866, as well as the 1853 Texas gubernatorial election. He was a delegate to the 1852 Whig National Convention.

Ochiltree was a member of the Texas House of Representatives, from November 5, 1855, to November 2, 1857, representing the 27th district. While serving, he was a member of the Joint Committees on Judicial Districts; and on Land Titles West of Nueces River. He was chairman of the House Committee on the Judiciary and on Slaves and Slavery, as well as a member of the Committees on Civil and Criminal Codes; on Constitutional Amendments; on Internal Improvements; and on Public Debt.

On March 13, 1858, Ochiltree moved to Marshall, where he joined the partnership Ochiltree, Jennings, & Wigfall. He was made chairman of the Texas Democratic Convention held that same year. A secessionist, he was a delegate to the 1861 constitutional convention, where he signed the state's declaration of secession. He was a signatory of the Provisional Constitution of Confederate States, later of the full Constitution. He was appointed to the Provisional Congress of the Confederate States, serving from 1861 until his resignation in 1862. While serving, he pushed for a port to be built in Sabine Pass, Port Arthur.

On April 12, 1862, Ochiltree organized the 18th Texas Infantry Regiment in Jefferson, with 98 men joining. He was made the regiment's colonel. A mild injury he sustained developed into illness, which led to his resignation in 1863. However, the Jefferson Jimplecute claims he fought alongside in the Battle of Mansfield, which occurred in 1864.

In 1863, Ochiltree was made district attorney of Marion County, as which he collected taxes to fund the war. On October 6, 1865, he re-established his law practice, operating between Jefferson and Marshall.

On October 4, 1866, during the Reconstruction era, a group of men in Jefferson entered the city's jailhouse and disarmed three guards, after which they killed a prisoner and two black men. Those accused of the crime were mainly prominent residents of Jefferson, Ochiltree being one of them. Those accused were arrested and charged with murder, though all but six men were acquirtted; it is unknown if Ochiltree was ever arrested.

== Personal life and legacy ==
In 1834, Ochiltree married Novaline Peck, with whom he had five children. She later died, and he married Mariah Louisa Smith, with whom he had at least four more children. She died, after which he married Atala T. Hotchkiss. One of his children was politician Thomas P. Ochiltree.

Ochiltree was Anglician and a Freemason. He was nicknamed "Buffalo Head", in reference to his large head; it was reported that he had hats specially made to fit his large head shape.

Ochiltree died on December 27, 1867, aged 56, in Jefferson, from illness, and was buried at the Oakwood Cemetery, in Jefferson. In 1876, Ochiltree County was named for him, as well as an unincorporared community of the same name. In 1963, a commemorative plaque in Perryton was installed in his honor.
