= John T. Mills =

American judge (1817–1871)

John T. Mills (November 12, 1817 – November 30, 1871) was an Irish-born American jurist who was an associate judge of the Third, Seventh and Eighth Judicial Districts of the Supreme Court of the Republic of Texas.

== Biography ==
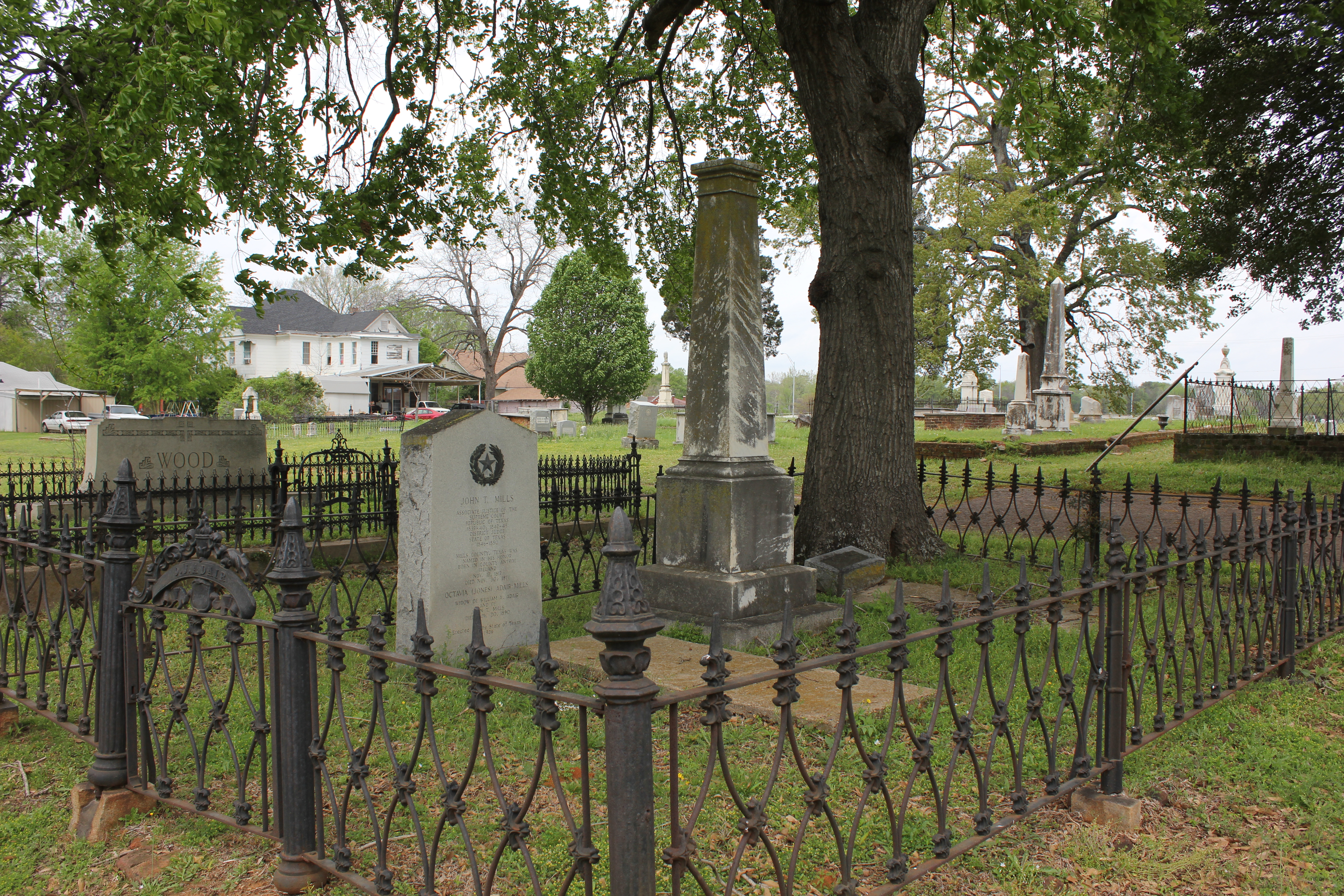
Grave of John T. Mills in Marshall, Texas.

Born in County Antrim, Ireland, Mills immigrated to America with his parents as a child. His family settled in Beaufort County, South Carolina, where he studied law before moving to Clarksville, Republic of Texas, in 1837. From 1839 to 1845 he served three consecutive terms as an associate judge of the Supreme Court in the Third, Seventh, and Eighth Judicial Districts. After Texas was admitted to the Union, he served as a judge for the state in various district courts from 1846 to 1850. In 1849, he ran on the Democratic ticket for governor, but was not elected.

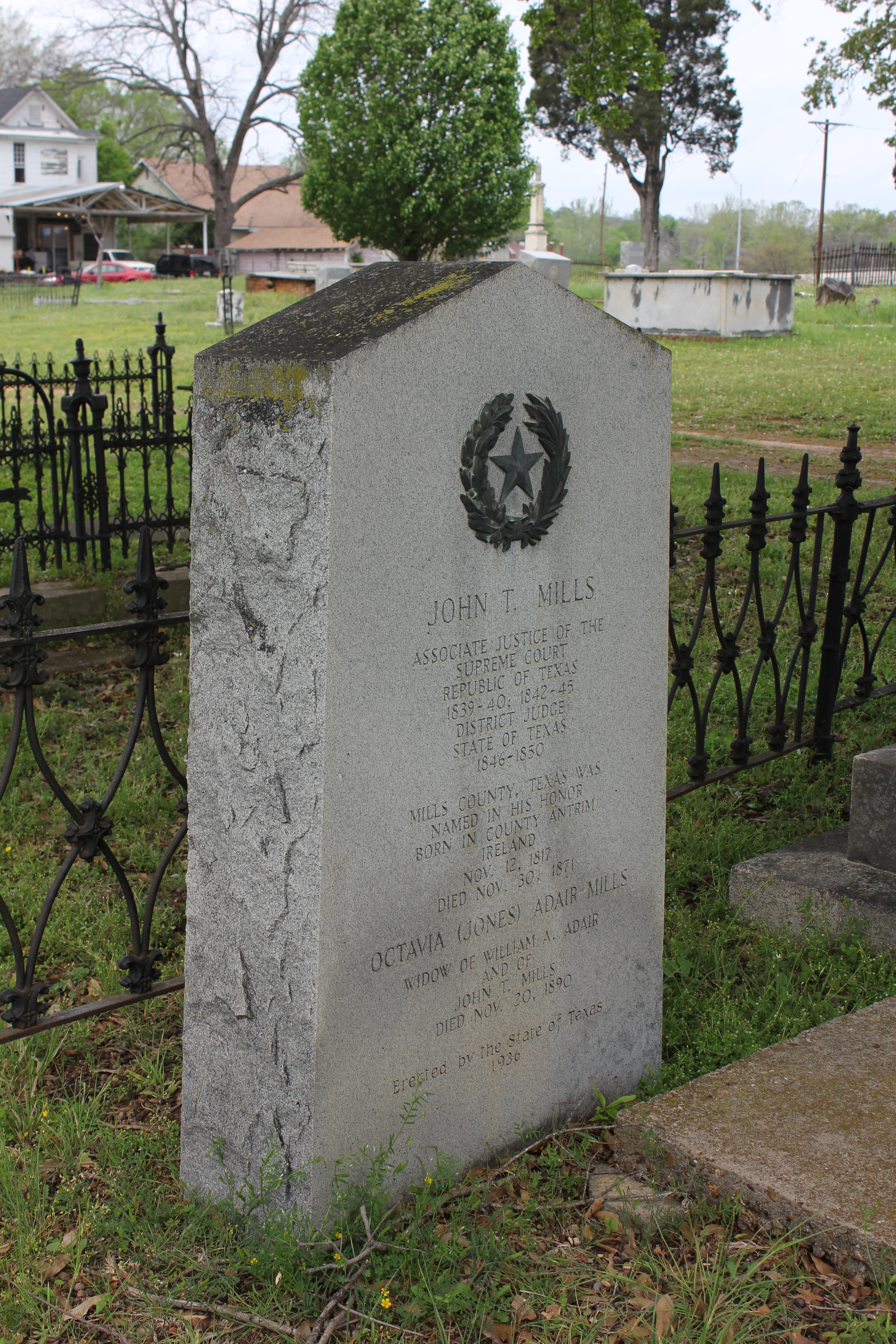
John T. Mills' headstone marker erected in 1936.

Mills' first marriage, to Mary Jane Vining, lasted from 1843 until her death in 1854; he married a Mrs. Adair and moved to Marshall shortly thereafter. His second marriage produced a son. John Mills died in Marshall, Texas, and is buried in the Marshall Cemetery there. Mills County, Texas, is named in his honor.
