= Anthony B. Shelby =

American judge (1789–1851)

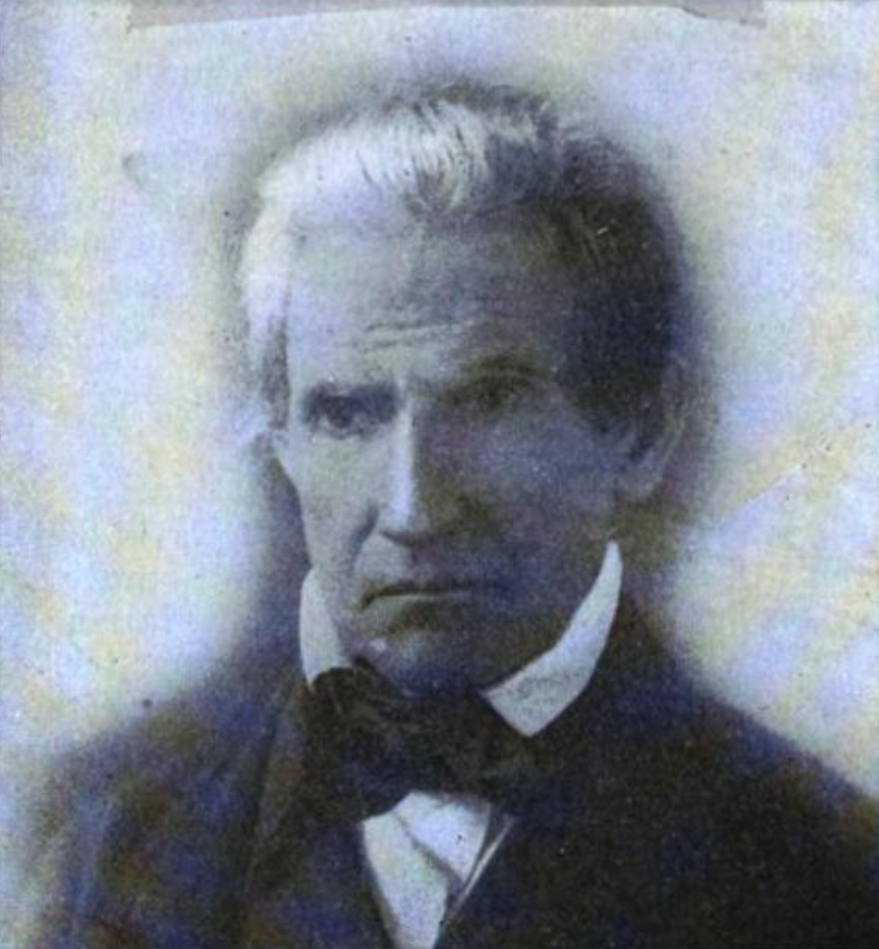
Judge Anthony B. Shelby

Anthony Bledsoe Shelby (January 15, 1789 – August 14, 1851) was a justice of the Supreme Court of the Republic of Texas from 1839 to 1841.

== Life and career ==
Born in Gallatin, Sumner County, Tennessee to David Shelby, an attorney, and Sarah Bledsoe, Shelby was descended on his father's side from the family of Revolutionary War participant Isaac Shelby, and on his mother's side was the grandson of Anthony Bledsoe of Kentucky. He read law to gain admission to the bar, and in the 1820s, he succeeded his father clerk of the Sumner Circuit Court. He later moved to Texas, where he "assisted in gaining independence for that state", and served as a justice of the Supreme Court of the Republic. As a justice, Shelby only wrote four opinions before resigning, Shelby's position on the court being tenuous, with the seat also being claimed by Thomas Johnson. One account of an event during Shelby's service relates the following:

In early 1840, during Shelby's tenure on the bench, the Galveston ran a story that outraged him. Shelby had one of the paper's founders, George H. French, as well as the paper's editor, arrested. French was sentenced to a year in jail and fined $1,000. The editor received ten days in jail and a fine of $200. When citizens of Houston and Galveston became enraged, Judge Thomas Johnson stepped in and remanded the sentences.

He later moved to Mississippi, settling in Brandon, Mississippi, where he remained for the rest of his life.

== Personal life ==
Shelby married Mariam Winchester, with whom he had thirteen children, five of whom died in childhood. a son, David Shelby, born in Gallatin, Sumner County, in May 1914, who went on to become a doctor, and was in turn the father of federal judge David Davie Shelby. Another son, Winchester B. Shelby, born in June 1827, also in Gallatin, was a colonel in Confederate States Army during the American Civil War.

He died in Brandon, Rankin County, Mississippi, and was buried in Brandon Cemetery.

Political offices
Preceded by Ezekiel Wimberly Cullen	Justice of the Texas Supreme Court; 1839–1841	Succeeded by Thomas Johnson
