= Richard Morris (Texas judge) =

American judge (1815–1844)

Richard Morris (December 27, 1815 – August 19, 1844) was a justice of the Supreme Court of the Republic of Texas from 1841 to 1844.

Morris was born in Hanover County, Virginia. His father, who shared the same name, was a prominent attorney and member of the Virginia State Legislature. Morris attended Burke High School in Richmond, and then studied for two years at the University of Virginia. He left to read law in his father's law office, and then returned to the University of Virginia for one semester of law study in 1835.

After being admitted to the bar in Virginia, Morris moved to Houston in the Republic of Texas in 1838, where he partnered with fellow Virginian native James H. Davis. Upon the death of Davis 1840, Morris moved again, establishing a solo practice in Galveston. In 1841 Mirabeau B. Lamar, President of the Republic of Texas, appointed Morris to the First Judicial District, automatically making him an associate justice of the Supreme Court.

Despite his youth, Morris was praised for his judicial temperament, but after only three terms on the court, he died of yellow fever.
