= Thomas Jefferson Rusk =

Texas military figure and politician (1803–1857)

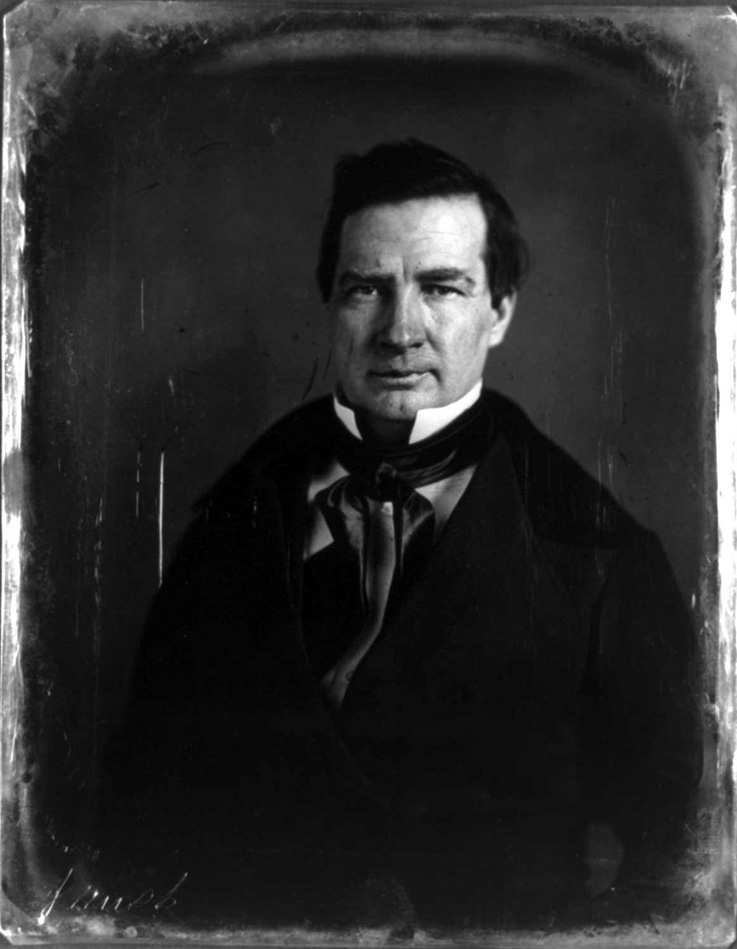

President pro tempore of the United States Senate
- In office March 14, 1857 – July 29, 1857
- Preceded by: James M. Mason
- Succeeded by: Benjamin Fitzpatrick

United States Senator from Texas
- In office February 21, 1846 – July 29, 1857
- Preceded by: Position established
- Succeeded by: James P. Henderson

Member of the Republic of Texas House of Representatives from Nacogdoches County
- In office 1837–1838
- Preceded by: John Kirby Allen
- Succeeded by: David S. Kaufman

1st Texas Secretary of War
- In office March 17, 1836 – November 13, 1837
- Preceded by: Position established
- Succeeded by: William S. Fisher

Personal details
- Born: December 5, 1803 Pendleton, South Carolina, US
- Died: July 29, 1857 (aged 53) Nacogdoches, Texas, US
- Cause of death: Suicide by gunshot
- Party: Democratic Party
- Spouse: Mary Frances "Polly" Cleveland Rusk
- Profession: Politician, lawyer, judge

Thomas Jefferson Rusk (December 5, 1803 – July 29, 1857) was an early political and military leader of the Republic of Texas, serving as its first secretary of war and as a general at the Battle of San Jacinto. He was later a U.S. politician and served as a senator from Texas from 1846 until his suicide. He served as the president pro tempore of the United States Senate in 1857.

== Early life ==
Rusk was born in Pendleton, South Carolina, to John Rusk, a stonemason, and Sterritt Rusk. After being admitted to the bar in 1825, Rusk began his law practice in Clarkesville, Georgia. In 1827, he married Mary F. (Polly) Cleveland, the daughter of General Benjamin Cleveland, grandson of Col. Benjamin Cleveland of King's Mountain fame. Rusk became a business partner of his father-in-law after the marriage. He lived in the gold region of Georgia and made sizable mining investments. In 1834, however, the managers of the company in which he had invested embezzled all the funds and fled to Mexican Texas. Rusk pursued them to Nacogdoches, but never recovered the money.

== Texas Revolution ==
Rusk decided to stay in Texas and became a citizen of Mexico in 1835, applied for a headright in David G. Burnet's colony, and sent for his family. After hearing Nacogdoches citizens denounce the despotism of Mexico, Rusk became involved in the independence movement. He organized volunteers from Nacogdoches and hastened to Gonzales, where his men joined Stephen F. Austin's army in preventing the Mexicans from seizing their cannon. They proceeded to San Antonio, but Rusk left the army before the Siege of Béxar.

The provisional government named him inspector general of the army in the Nacogdoches District. As a delegate from Nacogdoches to the Convention of 1836, Rusk not only signed the Texas Declaration of Independence, but also chaired the committee to revise the constitution of the Republic of Texas. The ad interim government, installed on March 17, 1836, appointed Rusk as secretary of war. When informed that the Alamo had fallen and the Mexican army was moving eastward, Rusk helped President David Burnet to move the government to Harrisburg.

After the Mexicans killed all James W. Fannin's Texan army at Goliad, Burnet sent Rusk with orders for General Sam Houston to make a stand against the enemy. Rusk participated with bravery in the defeat of Santa Anna on April 21, 1836, in the Battle of San Jacinto. From May to October 1836, he served as commander-in-chief of the Army of the Republic of Texas, with the rank of brigadier general. He followed the Mexican troops westward as they retired from Texas to be certain of their retreat beyond the Rio Grande. Then, he conducted a military funeral for the troops killed at Goliad.

The men of Texas deserved much credit, but more was due the women. Armed men facing a foe could not but be brave; but the women, with their little children around them, without means of defense or power to resist, faced danger and death with unflinching courage.

— Thomas Jefferson Rusk

== Republic of Texas ==
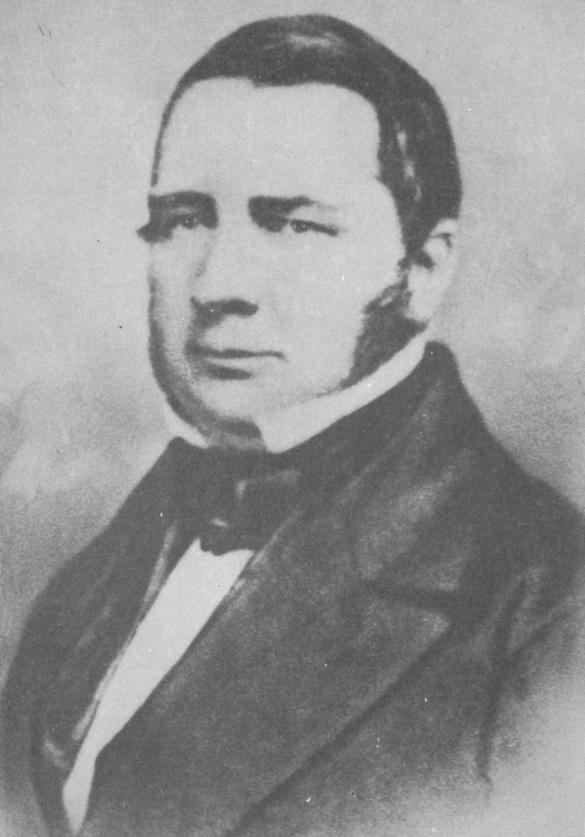
Thomas Jefferson Rusk

In the first regularly elected administration, President Houston appointed Rusk secretary of war, but after a few weeks, Rusk resigned to take care of pressing domestic problems. At the insistence of friends, however, he represented Nacogdoches in the Second Congress of the Republic (1837–1838). Rusk was a mason. He joined Milam Lodge No. 40 (Later Milam Lodge #2) in Nacogdoches in 1837 and was a founding member of the Grand Lodge of Texas, organized in Houston on December 20, 1837.

As chairman of the House Military Committee in 1837, he sponsored a militia bill that passed over Houston's veto, and Congress elected Rusk major general of the militia. In the summer of 1838, he commanded the Nacogdoches militia, which suppressed the Córdova Rebellion. In October, when Mexican agents were discovered among the Kickapoo Indians, Rusk defeated those Indians and their Indian allies. He captured marauding Caddo Indians in November 1838 and risked an international incident when he invaded United States territory to return them to the Indian agent in Shreveport, Louisiana.

On December 12, 1838, the Texas Congress elected Rusk chief justice of the republic's Supreme Court. He served until June 30, 1840, when he resigned to resume his law practice. Later, he headed the bar of the Republic of Texas. J. Pinckney Henderson, later the first governor of the state of Texas, and he formed a law partnership in 1841.

Early in 1843, Rusk was called upon once again to serve as a military commander. Concern over the lack of protection on the frontier caused Congress, in a joint ballot on January 16, 1843, to elect Rusk major general of the militia of the Republic of Texas, but he resigned in June when Houston obstructed his plans for aggressive warfare against Mexico. Rusk then turned his energies to establishing Nacogdoches University (operated 1845–1895). He served as vice president of the university when the charter was granted in 1845 and president in 1846.

== State of Texas ==
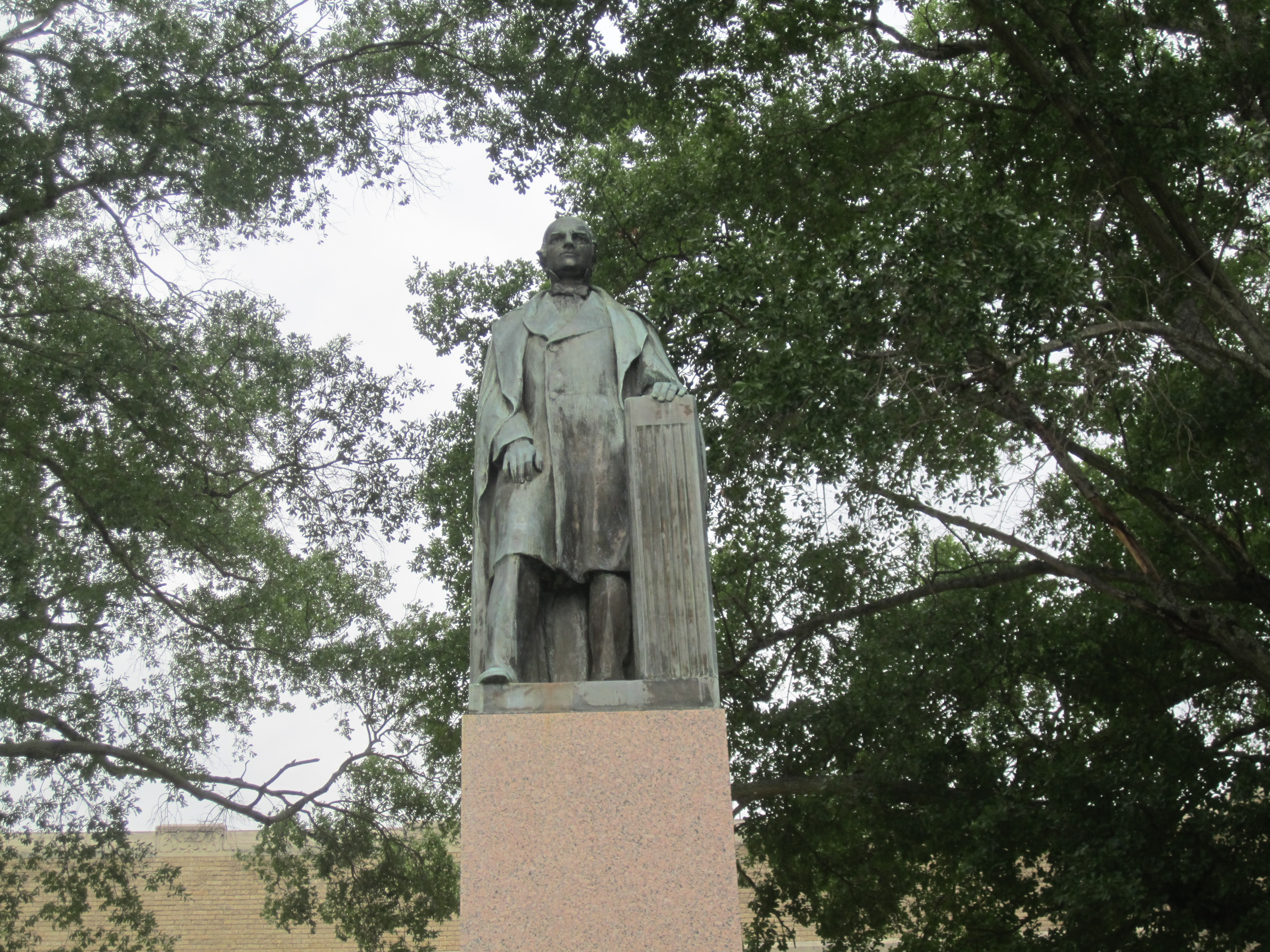
Statue of Thomas Jefferson Rusk at Rusk County Courthouse in Henderson, Texas

Rusk supported Sam Houston and the growing movement to annex Texas to the United States. He was president of the republic's Convention of 1845, which accepted the annexation terms. The first Texas state legislature elected Houston and him to the United States Senate in February 1846. Rusk received the larger number of votes and the longer term of office.

Rusk and Houston forgot past differences as they worked to settle the southwest boundary question in favor of Texas' claim to the Rio Grande. Rusk supported the position of US President James K. Polk on the necessity of the Mexican War and the acquisition of California. In the debate over the Compromise of 1850, Rusk refused to endorse secession, proposed by some in the caucus of Southern congressmen. He vigorously defended Texas' claims to the land used to create the New Mexico Territory in 1850, arguing for financial compensation for Texas.

As an early advocate of a transcontinental railroad through Texas, Senator Rusk made speeches in the Senate and throughout Texas in support of a southern route. The Gadsden Purchase received his support. Rusk was in favor of the Kansas–Nebraska Act. President James Buchanan offered him the position of United States postmaster general in 1857, but he turned it down. (Buchanan gave the post to Aaron V. Brown.)

While Rusk attended to duties in Washington, DC, his wife died of tuberculosis on April 23, 1856. Five of their seven children were still living at the time. During a special session in March 1857, he was elected president pro tempore of the United States Senate.

== Suicide ==
Missing his wife and ill from a tumor at the base of his neck, Rusk killed himself by a self-inflicted gunshot wound on July 29, 1857. He was 53 years old.

== Legacy ==
- The State of Texas placed a monument at the graves of Rusk and his wife, Mary, in Oak Grove Cemetery in Nacogdoches, Texas.
- Rusk County and the town of Rusk were named in his honor.
- Part of his homestead became the campus of Stephen F. Austin State University.
- A statue of Rusk is in front of the Rusk County courthouse in Henderson, Texas.
- His handwriting was the basis for the font Texas Hero designed by Brian Willson.
- Former Secretary of State Dean Rusk is a distant cousin.

== See also ==
- Timeline of the Texas Revolution
- List of members of the United States Congress who died in office (1790–1899)

== Notes ==
Political offices
| Preceded by (none) | Secretary of War of the Republic of Texas; 17 March 1836 – April 1836 | Succeeded by Mirabeau B. Lamar |
| Preceded by John Austin Wharton | Secretary of War of the Republic of Texas; 22 October 1836 – November 1837 | Succeeded by Barnard E. Bee, Sr. |
Legal offices
| Preceded by John Birdsall | Chief Justice of the Supreme Court of the Republic of Texas; 13 December 1838 – 30 June 1840 | Succeeded by John Hemphill |
U.S. Senate
| Preceded by (none) | U.S. senator (Class 1) from Texas; February 21, 1846 – July 29, 1857; Served alongside: Sam Houston | Succeeded by J. Pinckney Henderson |
Honorary titles
| Preceded by James M. Mason | President pro tempore of the United States Senate; March 14, 1857 – July 29, 1857 | Succeeded by Benjamin Fitzpatrick |
