= William E. Jones (politician) =

American judge (1808/10–1871)

William Early Jones (1808 or 1810 – April 18, 1871) was a justice of the Supreme Court of the Republic of Texas from 1843 to 1845.

Political offices
Preceded by Anderson Hutchinson	Justice of the Texas Supreme Court; 1843–1845	Succeeded by Court abolished
