= Patrick C. Jack =

American judge (1808–1844)

Justice of the Republic of Texas
- In office 1841 – August 4, 1844
- Preceded by: Richardson A. Scurry
- Succeeded by: Milford Phillips Norton

Personal details
- Born: Patrick Churchill Jack; 1808 Wilkes County, Georgia, U.S.
- Died: August 4, 1844 (aged 35–36)
- Cause of death: Yellow fever
- Resting place: Texas State Cemetery, Austin, Texas, U.S.
- Parent: Patrick Jack (father)
- Profession: Judge

Military service
- Allegiance: United States
- Battles/wars: Texas Revolution

Patrick Churchill Jack (1808–August 4, 1844) was a justice of the Supreme Court of the Republic of Texas from 1841 to 1844.

Patrick Churchill Jack was born in 1808 in Wilkes County, Georgia. His father, also named Patrick Jack, led a Georgia regiment during the war of 1812. He started his legal career in Jefferson County, Alabama before moving to Mexican Texas and receiving a small land grant in present-day Grimes County, Texas. Jack and his brother William Houston Jack both fought in the Texas Revolution in 1832, and Jack was a delegate to the Texas conventions of 1832 and 1833, representing the district of Liberty.

Jack died of yellow fever while campaigning as a candidate for Vice President of Texas, and was first buried at Houston City Cemetery, then exhumed and reburied in Lakeview Cemetery in Galveston, and then exhumed a third time in 1942 for burial at the Texas State Cemetery in Austin.

Jack County, Texas, and its county seat Jacksboro, are named for Patrick Jack and his brother William Houston Jack.

Political offices
| Preceded by Richardson A. Scurry | Justice of the Texas Supreme Court; 1841–1844 | Succeeded by Milford Phillips Norton |
