= William J. Jones =

American judge (1810–1897)

William Jefferson Jones (September 27, 1810 – May 10, 1897) was a justice of the Supreme Court of the Republic of Texas from 1840 to 1845.

Political offices
Preceded by Henry W. Fontaine	Justice of the Texas Supreme Court; 1840–1845	Succeeded by Court abolished
