= John Hemphill (Texas politician) =

American judge (1803–1862)

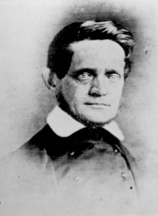

Member of the Provisional Congress of the Confederate States from Texas
- In office February 4, 1861 – January 4, 1862
- Preceded by: Constituency established
- Succeeded by: Constituency abolished

United States Senator from Texas
- In office March 4, 1859 – July 11, 1861
- Preceded by: Sam Houston
- Succeeded by: Morgan Hamilton (1870)

Personal details
- Born: December 18, 1803 Chester District, South Carolina, U.S.
- Died: January 4, 1862 (aged 58) Richmond, Virginia, C.S.
- Resting place: Texas State Cemetery
- Party: Democratic
- Relatives: John J. Hemphill (nephew); Robert Witherspoon Hemphill (great-great-nephew)
- Education: Jefferson College (BA)

John Hemphill (December 18, 1803 – January 4, 1862) was an American politician and jurist who served as chief justice of the Supreme Court of the Republic of Texas from 1841 to 1846 and of the Supreme Court of Texas until 1858, and a United States senator from Texas from 1859 to 1861. A member of the Democratic Party, he was one of the signatories of the Confederate States Constitution.

== Early life and education ==
Hemphill's father was a Presbyterian minister, Reverend John Hemphill, who emigrated to the United States from County Londonderry, Ireland. His mother, Jane Lind, was also Scots-Irish, but was born in Pennsylvania, where they met and married. John Hemphill the younger was born in South Carolina. He was educated at Jefferson College, graduating in 1825. He studied or "read the law" with David McCloud and was admitted to the bar in South Carolina in 1829.

== Career ==
=== Military career and move to Texas ===
In 1836, he volunteered for service in the Second Seminole War, achieving the rank of second lieutenant. Several years later in 1838, Hemphill moved his practice to Texas after it became an independent republic. Realizing that it was strongly influenced by Spanish law, he learned Spanish and studied its laws to be successful in this new environment.

=== Judicial career ===
A friend of Sam Houston, Hemphill was appointed and served as chief justice of the Supreme Court of the Republic of Texas from 1841 to 1846 and of the Supreme Court of Texas from 1846 to 1858, serving as the top jurist in the Republic and then the State of Texas. During this period, Texas was an independent republic and then a state in the United States before the Civil War.

He was called the "John Marshall of Texas" for the role he played in the development of Texan law from the republic's early years, "laying the foundation of its judiciary system". The challenges were far beyond the law; Hemphill became known for an incident in which he fought Indian warriors who had attacked him in a courtroom while his court was in session.

Hemphill was considered an expert on Spanish and Mexican law, and he considered Spanish civil law to be superior to common law in many areas, especially in relation to the property. He is remembered for expanding women's rights so that women could inherit equally. He also supported homestead rights in adoption of principles of Spanish civil law. Hemphill was elected in 1858 to replace Sam Houston as United States senator from Texas when Houston would not support the assertion that states have a right to secede from the United States. He served from 1859 to 1861.

As Texas was one of the first seven states to secede from the Union, Hemphill was among the 14 United States senators expelled by Congressional resolution in 1861. He was subsequently chosen as a Texas delegate to the Provisional Confederate Congress, a position he held until his death in Richmond, Virginia.

== Personal life ==
Hemphill never married. He lived with his slave Sabina for more than a decade and had two daughters with her. He arranged for their education, sending them in the late 1850s to the newly founded Wilberforce University in Ohio, considered a "training ground" for abolitionists before the Civil War. John Hemphill was a cousin of Charles Hare Hemphill, Lord Hemphill through his father. His nephew was John J. Hemphill and his great-great-nephew was Robert Witherspoon Hemphill.

== Legacy ==
The city of Hemphill, Texas, and Hemphill County, Texas, are named after him.

== See also ==
- List of United States senators from Texas
- List of United States senators expelled or censured

U.S. Senate
Preceded by Sam Houston	U.S. Senator (Class 2) from Texas; 1859–1861; Served alongside: Matthias Ward, Louis Wigfall	Vacant Title next held by Morgan Hamilton; 1870
Confederate States House of Representatives
New constituency	Member of the Provisional Congress of the Confederate States from Texas; 1861–1862	Constituency abolished
