= List of speakers of the Texas House of Representatives =

The speaker of the Texas House of Representatives is the presiding officer of the Texas House of Representatives.

For more information about the office and powers of the Speaker see Speaker of the Texas House of Representatives.

== Republic of Texas ==
Speakers of the House of Representatives in the Congresses of the Republic of Texas.

Name	Term in office	Congress
Ira Ingram	1836–1837	1st
Branch Tanner Archer	1837	2nd
Joseph Rowe	1838	2nd
John M. Hansford	1838–1839	3rd
David Spangler Kaufman	1840–1841	4th
David Spangler Kaufman	1840–1841	5th
Kenneth Lewis Anderson	1841–1842	6th
Nicholas Henry Darnell	1842–1843	7th
Richardson A. Scurry	1843–1844	8th
John M. Lewis	1844–1846	9th

== State of Texas ==
Seal of the Speaker of the Texas House of Representatives

Speakers of the House of Representatives in the Legislatures of the State of Texas.

Name	Party	Term in office	Legislative sessions
William Crump	Democratic	February 16, 1846 – March 3, 1846	1st
John "Red" Brown	Democratic	March 3, 1846 – March 9, 1846	1st
Edward Thomas Branch	Democratic	March 9, 1846 – March 16, 1846	1st
William Crump	Democratic	March 16, 1846 – May 1, 1846	1st
William H. Bourland	Democratic	May 1, 1846 – May 11, 1846	1st
Stephen W. Perkins	Democratic	May 11, 1846 – December 13, 1847	1st
J. W. Henderson	Democratic	December 13, 1847 – November 5, 1849	2nd
Charles G. Keenan	Democratic	November 5, 1849 – November 3, 1851	3rd
David Catchings Dickson	Democratic	November 3, 1851 – November 7, 1853	4th
Hardin Richard Runnels	Democratic	November 7, 1853 – November 5, 1855	5th
Hamilton Prioleau Bee	Democratic	November 5, 1855 – November 2, 1857	6th
William S. Taylor	Democratic	November 2, 1857 – January 18, 1858	7th
Matthew Fielding Locke	Democratic	January 18, 1858 – November 7, 1859	7th
M. D. K. Taylor	Democratic	November 7, 1859 – November 4, 1861	8th
Constantine W. Buckley	Democratic	November 4, 1861 – December 7, 1861	9th
Nicholas Henry Darnell	Democratic	December 7, 1861 – January 14, 1862	9th
Vacant		January 14, 1862 – February 2, 1863	9th
Constantine W. Buckley	Democratic	February 2, 1863 – November 2, 1863	9th
M. D. K. Taylor	Democratic	November 2, 1863 – August 6, 1866	10th
Nathaniel Macon Burford	Unionist	August 6, 1866 – April 25, 1869	11th
Vacant		April 25, 1869 – February 8, 1870	11th
Ira Hobart Evans	Republican	February 10, 1870 – May 10, 1871	12th
William Henry Sinclair	Republican	May 10, 1871 – January 14, 1873	12th
M. D. K. Taylor	Democratic	January 14, 1873 – January 13, 1874	13th
Guy Morrison Bryan	Democratic	January 13, 1874 – April 18, 1876	14th
Thomas Reuben Bonner	Democratic	April 18, 1876 – January 14, 1879	15th
John Hughes Cochran	Democratic	January 14, 1879 – January 11, 1881	16th
George Robertson Reeves	Democratic	January 11, 1881 – September 5, 1882	17th
Charles Reese Gibson	Democratic	1883–1885	18th
Lafayette Lumpkin Foster	Democratic	1885–1887	19th
George Cassety Pendleton	Democratic	1887–1889	20th
Frank P. Alexander	Democratic	1889–1891	21st
Robert Teague Milner	Democratic	1891–1893	22nd
John Hughes Cochran	Democratic	1893–1895	23rd
Thomas Slater Smith	Democratic	1895–1897	24th
L. Travis Dashiell	Democratic	1897–1899	25th
James S. Sherrill	Democratic	1899–1901	26th
Robert E. Prince	Democratic	1901–1903	27th
Pat Morris Neff	Democratic	1903–1905	28th
Francis William Seabury	Democratic	1905–1907	29th
Thomas Bell Love	Democratic	1907–1909	30th
Austin Milton Kennedy	Democratic	1909	31st
John Wesley Marshall	Democratic	1909–1911	31st
Sam Rayburn	Democratic	1911–1913	32nd
Chester H. Terrell	Democratic	1913–1915	33rd
John William Woods	Democratic	1915–1917	34th
Franklin Oliver Fuller	Democratic	1917–1919	35th
Robert Ewing Thomason	Democratic	1919–1921	36th
Charles Graham Thomas	Democratic	1921–1923	37th
Richard Ernest Seagler	Democratic	1923–1925	38th
Lee Satterwhite	Democratic	1925–1927	39th
Robert Lee Bobbitt	Democratic	1927–1929	40th
Wingate S. Barron	Democratic	1929–1931	41st
Fred Hawthorne Minor	Democratic	1931–1933	42nd
Coke R. Stevenson	Democratic	1933–1937	43rd
Coke R. Stevenson	Democratic	1933–1937	44th
Robert Wilburn Calvert	Democratic	1937–1939	45th
Robert Emmett Morse	Democratic	1939–1941	46th
Homer LaKirby Leonard	Democratic	1941–1943	47th
Price Daniel	Democratic	1943–1945	48th
Claud H. Gilmer	Democratic	1945–1947	49th
William O. Reed	Democratic	1947–1949	50th
Thomas Durwood Manford Jr.	Democratic	1949–1951	51st
Reuben E. Senterfitt	Democratic	1951–1955	52nd
Reuben E. Senterfitt	Democratic	1951–1955	53rd
Jim T. Lindsey	Democratic	1955–1957	54th
Waggoner Carr	Democratic	1957–1961	55th
Waggoner Carr	Democratic	1957–1961	56th
Jimmy Turman	Democratic	1961	57th
Byron M. Tunnell	Democratic	1963	58th
Ben Barnes	Democratic	1965–1969	59th
Ben Barnes	Democratic	1965–1969	60th
Gus Franklin Mutscher	Democratic	1969–1972	61st
Gus Franklin Mutscher	Democratic	1969–1972	62nd
Rayford Price	Democratic	1972–1973	62nd
Price Daniel Jr.	Democratic	1973–1975	63rd
Bill W. Clayton	Democratic	1975–1983	64th
Bill W. Clayton	Democratic	1975–1983	65th
Bill W. Clayton	Democratic	1975–1983	66th
Bill W. Clayton	Democratic	1975–1983	67th
Gib Lewis	Democratic	1983–1993	68th
Gib Lewis	Democratic	1983–1993	69th
Gib Lewis	Democratic	1983–1993	70th
Gib Lewis	Democratic	1983–1993	71st
Gib Lewis	Democratic	1983–1993	72nd
Pete Laney	Democratic	1993–2003	73rd
Pete Laney	Democratic	1993–2003	74th
Pete Laney	Democratic	1993–2003	75th
Pete Laney	Democratic	1993–2003	76th
Pete Laney	Democratic	1993–2003	77th
Tom Craddick	Republican	2003–2009	78th
Tom Craddick	Republican	2003–2009	79th
Tom Craddick	Republican	2003–2009	80th
Joe Straus	Republican	2009–2019	81st
Joe Straus	Republican	2009–2019	82nd
Joe Straus	Republican	2009–2019	83rd
Joe Straus	Republican	2009–2019	84th
Joe Straus	Republican	2009–2019	85th
Dennis Bonnen	Republican	2019–2021	86th
Dade Phelan	Republican	2021–2025	87th
Dade Phelan	Republican	2021–2025	88th
Dustin Burrows	Republican	2025–present	89th

== See also ==
- List of Texas state legislatures
