= M. D. K. Taylor =

American politician (1818–1897)

Marion DeKalb Taylor or M. D. K. Taylor (October 13, 1818 – June 22, 1897) was an American politician in Alabama and Texas, and a Texas militia colonel during the American Civil War. He was a member of the Alabama Legislature for two stints between 1842 and 1846, and served in both the Texas House of Representatives and the Texas Senate. In the Texas House, Taylor served three non-consecutive terms as Speaker of the House, and, in the Texas Senate, was twice elected President pro tempore of the Texas Senate.

== Biography ==
Taylor was born in Jones County, Georgia to Anne Mathews and Ward Taylor, who was a blacksmith, farmer, and Methodist preacher. The family had moved to Butler County, Alabama, by 1822. M. D. K. Taylor received his education in Alabama and studied medicine there. Taylor married the 14-year-old Elizabeth Sarah McDaniel in 1838 and, for the next 24 years, they would have some nine children together. Taylor was elected to the Alabama Legislature from Butler County in 1842. He was an advocate for the annexation of Texas, a position which cost him re-election in 1844. However, he was again sent to the Alabama Legislature in 1845, serving through the following year.

In January 1847, Taylor and family moved to Cass County, Texas (present-day Marion County), where he served as Postmaster for a time. He was elected to the House of Representatives of Third Texas Legislature (1849–1851), and the Senate of the Fourth Legislature from District 5 (1851–1853). After a Senate redistricting, Taylor was elected from the 7th District for the Fifth, Sixth, and Seventh Legislatures (1853–1859). In the Fifth Legislature, Taylor was elected President pro tempore of the Senate, a position he also held for part of the Seventh Legislature.

He returned to the House for the Eighth Legislature and was elected Speaker, defeating Nicholas Henry Darnell 45 votes to 33 on the second ballot. In the Tenth Texas Legislature, Taylor was again elected Speaker, defeating Constantine W. Buckley, 45 votes to 18. During this session, held in the midst of the Civil War, Taylor helped to pass resolutions praising Jefferson Davis, and stating support of the Confederate government. Taylor also served as a colonel for the 7th Militia Brigade during the Civil War.

In 1864, his wife Elizabeth died, probably during childbirth. Shortly thereafter, Taylor married Sarah Adda Pardue, who would herself die in 1866.

In 1873, for the Thirteenth Texas Legislature, Taylor was elected Speaker for an unprecedented third time, defeating W. A. Ellett 76 votes to 10.

Taylor was very active in Democratic Party affairs, attending the Democratic State Conventions in 1872 and 1888, while serving as president of the 1876, 1878, and 1880 state conventions. Taylor was also a delegate to the 1876 Democratic National Convention in St. Louis.

According to some sources, Taylor was the father of several illegitimate African American children, one of whom he sent east to attend school.

Taylor died after a fall on June 22, 1897, and is buried in the Taylor family cemetery near Jefferson.

== Notes ==
Preceded by Unknown	Member of the Alabama Legislature; 1842–1844	Succeeded by Unknown
Preceded by Unknown	Member of the Alabama Legislature; 1845–1846	Succeeded by Unknown
Texas House of Representatives
Preceded by Unknown	Member of the Texas House of Representatives; 1849–1851	Succeeded by Unknown
Texas Senate
Preceded by David Gage	Texas State Senator from District 5 (Jefferson); 1851–1853	Succeeded by Jefferson Weatherford
Preceded by Isaac Parker	Texas State Senator from District 7 (Cass County)^{(1)} 1853–1859	Succeeded by John Green Chambers
Preceded by Jesse Grimes	President pro tempore of the Texas Senate; 1853	Succeeded by Guy Morrison Bryan
Preceded by Jesse Grimes	President pro tempore of the Texas Senate; 1857–1858	Succeeded by Samuel Maverick
Texas House of Representatives
Preceded by Unknown	Member of the Texas House of Representatives; 1859–1877	Succeeded by Unknown
Preceded by Matthew Fielding Locke	Speaker of the Texas House of Representatives; November 7, 1859–November 4, 1861	Succeeded by Constantine W. Buckley
Preceded by Constantine W. Buckley	Speaker of the Texas House of Representatives; November 2, 1863–August 6, 1866	Succeeded by Nathaniel Macon Burford
Preceded by William Henry Sinclair	Speaker of the Texas House of Representatives; January 14, 1873–January 13, 1874	Succeeded by Guy Morrison Bryan
Preceded by Unknown	Member of the Texas House of Representatives; 1879–1881	Succeeded by Unknown
Notes and references
1. For the 5th and 6th Texas Legislatures, Taylor’s home city was Smithland
