= 8th Texas Legislature =

The 8th Texas Legislature met from November 7, 1859 to April 9, 1861 in its regular session, a first called session, and an adjourned session. All members of the House of Representatives and about half of the members of the Senate were elected in 1859.

== Sessions ==
- 8th Regular session: November 7, 1859 – February 13, 1860
- 8th First called session: January 21–February 9, 1861
- 8th Adjourned session: March 18–April 9, 1861

== Officers ==
=== Senate ===
Lieutenant Governor
Edward Clark, Democrat
President pro tempore
Jesse Grimes, Democrat, Regular session

=== House of Representatives ===
Speaker of the House
M. D. K. Taylor, Democrat

== Members ==
Members of the Eighth Texas Legislature at the beginning of the regular session, November 7, 1859:

=== Senate ===
District	Senator	Party	Took office
1	James W. Sims	Democrat	1859
2	Lewis G. Harmon	Democrat	1859
3	Martin D. Hart	Democrat	1859
4	James W. Throckmorton	Democrat	1857
5	Albert G. Walker	Democrat	1857 (First time: 1849–1851)
6	Emory Rains	Democrat	1859
7	John Green Chambers	Democrat	1859
8	Louis T. Wigfall	Democrat	1857
9	Jesse H. Parsons	Democrat	1859
10	Elisha Everett Lott	Democrat	1853
11	Robert Henry Guinn	Democrat	1853
12	Alexis T. Rainey	Democrat	1859
13	John N. Fall	Democrat	1857
14	John R. Dickinson	Democrat	1859
15	Henry C. Wallace	Democrat	1859
16	Enoch S. Pitts	Democrat	1859
17	Mark M. Potter	Democrat	1851
18	Abram Morris Gentry	Democrat	1859
19	Jesse Grimes	Democrat	1855 (First time: 1846–1853)
20	Chauncey Berkeley Shepard	Democrat	1857
21	David M. Whaley	Democrat	1858
22	Francis Marion Martin	Democrat	1859
23	George Bernard Erath	Democrat	1857
24	George E. Quinan	Democrat	1857
25	Eggleston D. Townes	Democrat	1859
26	Fletcher S. Stockdale	Democrat	1857
27	Thomas Hinds Duggan	Democrat	1859 (First time: 1851–1853)
28	Edwin B. Scarborough	Democrat	1853
29	Forbes Britton	Democrat	1857
30	Isaiah Addison Paschal	Democrat	1857 (First time: 1853–1855)
31	Gustav Schleicher	Democrat	1859
32	Claiborne C. Herbert	Democrat	1857
33	Archibald C. Hyde	Democrat	1857

=== House of Representatives ===
District	Representative	Party	Took office
1	Solomon H. Pirkey	Unknown	November 12, 1859

- Basilio Benavides
- Anthony Martin Branch
- Kindallis Bryan
- Constantine W. Buckley
- William Clark
- David B. Culberson
- Nicholas Henry Darnell
- John Wilson Davis, Jr.
- Isaac N. Dennis
- David Catchings Dickson
- Edward Dougherty
- Foscue
- James Carlton Francis
- Benjamin Cromwell Franklin
- De Witt Clinton Fort
- Lindsay Hagler, San Patricio County
- James Marshall Harrison
- John L. Haynes
- J. W. Henderson
- Alfred Marmaduke Hobby
- Richard Bennett Hubbard, Jr.
- Henry Lawrence Kinney
- Francis J. Lynch
- John Haywood Manley
- Samuel Maverick
- John N. McClarty
- George McKnight
- Roger Q. Mills
- William Wright Morris
- Titus H. Mundine
- José Ángel Navarro
- Allison Nelson
- Anthony Banning Norton
- Benjamin F. Parker
- Samuel Redgate
- Joel Walter Robison
- Shelton
- Daniel McDowell Short
- John Dennis Stell
- M. D. K. Taylor
- Robert H. Taylor
- Robert J. Townes
- Jacob Waelder
- Charles A. Warfield
- George Washington Whitmore
- William Amos Wortham
- Friedrich Wilhelm von Wrede, Jr.

== Membership changes ==
=== Senate ===
District	Outgoing Senator	Reason for Vacancy	Successor	Date of Successor's Installation
District 3	Martin D. Hart	Hart resigned February 26, 1861.	Turner L. Greene	Unknown
District 8	Louis T. Wigfall	Wigfall announced his resignation on December 7, 1859.	E. A. Blanch	January 14, 1860
District 9	Jesse H. Parsons	Parsons resigned after the adjourned session.	None	
District 12	Alexis T. Rainey	Rainey resigned after the regular session.	Steward Alexander Miller	January 21, 1861
District 14	John R. Dickinson	Dickinson resigned after the regular session.	Henry P. C. Dulany	January 26, 1861
District 15	Henry C. Wallace	Wallace resigned January 4, 1861.	Franklin Barlow Sexton	None
District 15	Franklin Barlow Sexton	Sexton did not appear.	None	
District 25	Eggleston D. Townes	Townes resigned March 13, 1861.	Nathan George Shelley	November 4, 1861
District 29	Forbes Britton	Britton died February 14, 1861.	Benjamin Franklin Neal	March 19, 1861
District 30	Isaiah Addison Paschal	Paschal resigned March 29, 1861.	Unknown	Unknown

- District 15: Sexton did not return from Confederate States Army service in time to meet with the legislature.
- District 25: Shelley elected in special election held March 25, 1861 and sworn in with the Ninth Texas Legislature.

=== House of Representatives ===
District	Outgoing Representative	Reason for Vacancy	Successor	Date of Successor's Installation
District 22	John N. McClarty	McClarty resigned after the regular session.	William Wright Morris	January 22, 1861
District 65	Henry Lawrence Kinney	Kinney was opposed to secession and resigned February 9, 1861.	Alfred Marmaduke Hobby	March 19, 1861
