= James S. Sherrill =

American politician and lawyer (1854–1931)

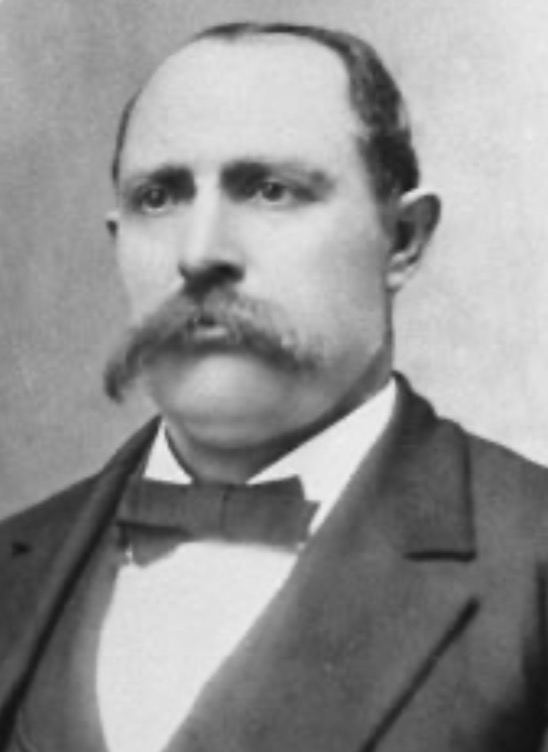
- Sherrill's portrait for the 26th Texas Legislature

Member of the Texas House of Representatives from the 15th district
- In office January 10, 1893 – January 8, 1895
- Preceded by: Jonathon D. Rudd
- Succeeded by: Bethel Quillian Evans
- In office January 10, 1899 – January 8, 1901 Serving with Louis P. Wilson
- Preceded by: Bethel Quillian Evans; Jonathon D. Rudd
- Succeeded by: Seaborn Jones Hendrick; William Pierson

Speaker of the Texas House of Representatives
- In office January 10, 1899 – January 8, 1901
- Preceded by: L. Travis Dashiell
- Succeeded by: Robert E. Prince

Member of the Texas Senate from the 5th district
- In office January 8, 1895 – January 12, 1897
- Preceded by: John W. Cranford
- Succeeded by: James R. Gough

Personal details
- Born: James Stevens Sherrill; September 15, 1854 Fannin County, Texas, US
- Died: February 15, 1931 (aged 76) Houston, Texas, US
- Party: Democratic
- Occupation: Politician, lawyer

James Stevens Sherrill (September 15, 1854 – February 15, 1931) was an American politician and lawyer. A Democrat, he served in both branches of the Texas Legislature, including a term as Speaker of the House.

== Early life and education ==
Sherrill was born on September 15, 1854, in Fannin County, Texas. His father was a businessman in Honey Grove. He grew up on a farm in Fannin County. Sources conflict on his early education, with him either attending public schools in Bonham, or undergoing private study. He studied at Carlton College.

== Career ==
Sherrill worked as a schoolteacher for some time between his early and higher education. In 1878, he was admitted to the bar, after which he practiced law in Fannin County for two years. He then moved to Greenville. From 1882 to 1888, he was judge of Hunt County.

Sherrill was a Democrat. He was a member of the Texas House of Representatives, from January 10, 1893, to January 8, 1895, and again from January 10, 1899, to January 8, 1901, both times representing the 15th district. In his second term, he served as Speaker of the House. During his tenure, he was a member of the Committees on Counties and County Boundaries; on Education; on Enrolled Bills; on Insurance, Statistics and History; on Judicial Districts; and on the Judiciary.

Sherrill was a member of the Texas Senate, from January 8, 1895, to January 12, 1897, representing the 5th district. While serving, he was chairman of the Committees on Contingent Expenses, and on Insurance, Statistics and History, as well as a member of the Committees on Education; on Internal Improvements; on Judicial Districts; on the Judiciary; on Privileges and Elections; on Public Lands; on Roads and Bridges; and on State Asylums.

After serving in the Legislature, Sherrill returned to practicing law. He moved to Houston in 1916, after the creation of the Farm Credit System, where he worked for several years at the Houston land bank. By 1918, he was in a partnership with Thomas D. Starnes.

== Personal life and death ==
Sherrill married Leon Hall, with whom he had a daughter. She later died, after which he married Kate Farr. He died on February 15, 1931, aged 76, in Houston. He was buried on February 17, at East Mount Cemetery.
