= Homer LaKirby Leonard =

American politician (1899–1979)

Member of the Texas House of Representatives from the 73rd district
- In office January 13, 1931 – January 14, 1947
- Preceded by: William Rogers Montgomery
- Succeeded by: Joe M. Kilgore

Speaker of the Texas House of Representatives
- In office January 14, 1941 – January 12, 1943
- Preceded by: Robert Emmett Morse
- Succeeded by: Price Daniel

Personal details
- Born: January 14, 1899 Licking, Missouri, US
- Died: February 13, 1979 (aged 80) Austin, Texas, US
- Resting place: Texas State Cemetery
- Party: Democratic
- Other political affiliations: Good Government Party; Independent
- Occupation: Politician

Homer LaKirby Leonard (January 14, 1899 – February 13, 1979) was an American politician. A Democrat, he was a member of the Texas House of Representatives, including a term as Speaker of the House.

== Early life and education ==
Leonard was born on January 14, 1899, in Licking, Missouri. Raised in Rolla, he was educated there and worked as a wireless telegrapher for a time. He studied at the Missouri University of Science and Technology, graduating with a degree in mining engineering in 1922. While attending, he edited the school newspaper.

== Career ==
Leonard worked as a geologist and surveyor for oilfields in Kansas and Oklahoma, though found himself unfit for a career in the industry. He then moved to Flagler, Colorado and worked as a schoolteacher. He later worked as a teacher at the Missouri University of Science and Technology. In 1927, he moved to McAllen, Texas, following his acquisition of the McAllen Monitor. He and a partner operated the newspaper until 1934. After selling the paper, he operated a printing company which printed the newspaper, selling that in 1947.

Leonard was a member of the Texas House of Representatives, from January 13, 1931, to January 14, 1947, representing the 73rd district. He was Speaker of the House, from January 14, 1941, to January 12, 1943, with him relinquishing his position for the following terms. He lost his re-election to the House. During his first term, he was a member of the "Good Government Party", serving as an independent between his second and fourth terms, before affiliating with the Democratic Party for the remainder of his tenure.

While serving, Leonard was chairman of the Committees on Appropriations; on Privileges, Suffrage and Elections; and on Revenue and Taxation. He was a member of the Committees on Agriculture; on Congressional and Legislative Districts; on Conservation and Reclamation; on Highways and Motor Traffic; on Insurance; on Judicial Districts; on Public Printing; and on the State Eleemosynary and Reformatory Institutions.

In 1939, Leonard was admitted to the bar. He was a member of the partnership Leonard & Hall, which dissolved on November 1, 1942. From 1947 to 1971, he worked for the Texas Brewers' Institute, as a general legal counsel and later as a lobbyist.

== Personal life and death ==
On May 19, 1935, Leonard married Nona Barbara Byerly. He died on February 13, 1979, aged 80, in Austin. He was buried on February 16, at the Texas State Cemetery.
