= Claud H. Gilmer =

American politician and lawyer (1901–1983)

Member of the Texas House of Representatives from the 86th district
- In office January 10, 1939 – January 11, 1949
- Preceded by: Coke R. Stevenson
- Succeeded by: James Callan Graham

Speaker of the Texas House of Representatives
- In office January 9, 1945 – January 14, 1947
- Preceded by: Price Daniel
- Succeeded by: William O. Reed

Personal details
- Born: Claud Henry Gilmer; March 12, 1901 Rocksprings, Texas, US
- Died: February 26, 1983 (aged 81) San Antonio, Texas, US
- Party: Democratic
- Occupation: Politician, lawyer

Claud Henry Gilmer (March 12, 1901 – February 26, 1983) was an American politician and lawyer. A Democrat, he was a member of the Texas House of Representatives, including a term as Speaker of the House.

== Early lif, education, and early career ==
Gilmer was born on March 12, 1901, in Rocksprings, Texas. His family owned a pharmacy. A graduate of Rocksprings High School, he studied at the Meridian Community College and at the University of Texas System for some time.

Gilmer worked as a schoolteacher for Rocksprings High school for two years, during which he coached the football team, then was its principal for a year and a half. He was made judge of Edwards County c. 1924, and earned a law degree in 1929.

== Politics and later career ==
Gilmer was a Democrat. He was a member of the Texas House of Representatives, from January 10, 1939, to January 11, 1949, representing the 86th district. He was Speaker of the House, from January 9, 1945, to January 14, 1947. He, alongside A. M. Aikin Jr., wrote the Gilmer-Aikin Act of 1949.

While serving, Gilmer was chairman of the Committees on Appropriations, and on the Judiciary, as well as vice-chairman of the Committees on Public Lands and Buildings. He was a member of the Committees on Appropriations; on Common Carriers; on Constitutional Amendments; on Contingent Expenses; on Game and Fisheries; on Highways and Motor Traffic; on Highways and Roads; on Judicial Redistricting; on the Judiciary and Uniform State Laws; on Livestock and Stock Raising; on Local and Uncontested Bills; on Motor Transportation; on State Affairs; and on Rules.

After serving in the House, Gilmer practiced law. He was president of the Peoples State Bank of Rocksprings, as well as the Rocksprings and Nueces Canyon Telephone Company. He was president of the Texas Telephone Association, an organization which he worked as a lobbyist for at times. From 1949 to 1955, he was chairman of the Board of Texas State Hospitals and Special Schools. He also owned a ranch in Edwards County. In 1959, a ranch-to-market road was proposed which would have gone through Gilmer's land, and was thus dubbed the "Claud Gilmer Road".

== Personal life and death ==
Gilmer married Georgia Carlson, with whom he had two children. In 1943, he moved to Kerrville to practice law. On August 21, 1950, he and his wife got into a traffic collision on U.S. Route 87, near Comfort; he fractured his pelvis and lacerated his scalp, while his wife fractured her skull and wrist. He died on February 26, 1983, aged 81, in San Antonio.
