= Nicholas Henry Darnell =

American politician (1807–1885)

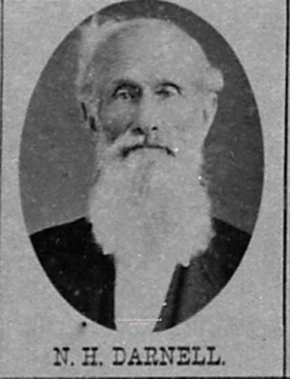
Nicholas Henry Darnell during the 15th Texas Legislature

Nicholas Henry Darnell (April 20, 1807 – July 16, 1885) was an American politician in Tennessee and Texas. He was the only person to serve as Speaker of the House of the Republic of Texas House of Representatives and the State of Texas House of Representatives. He was a member of the Tennessee General Assembly prior to his move to Texas, and during the Civil War raised and led the 18th Texas Cavalry Regiment, which was also known by the name of "Darnell's Regiment."

== Biography ==
Darnell was born on April 20, 1807, to Nannie Flewellen and Nicholas Darnell in Williamson County, Tennessee, where he was raised by his grandfather, William Flewellen. Darnell married Isabelle Cozart and the two would have seven children. At 28, he ran for the Tennessee General Assembly, but lost by 8 votes. Two years later, he won election unopposed, but resigned in 1838 to move to San Augustine, Texas.

In San Augustine, Darnell was sent to the Sixth and Seventh Congresses of the Republic of Texas. In the Seventh Congress, Darnell was elected Speaker of the House on November 24, 1842. After Annexation, Darnell narrowly lost the Lieutenant Governor's race to Albert Clinton Horton. While in San Augustine, Darnell helped to organize the Masonic Lodge there and held all offices of the Grand Lodge of Texas.

Darnell appears to have served in the House of Representatives of the First Texas Legislature, as he is listed as receiving one vote for Speaker in the election held to replace William Crump. He moved to Dallas in 1858, and was elected to the House for the Eighth (1859), and Ninth (1861) Texas Legislatures. Darnell was nominated for Speaker of the House in the Eighth Legislature on the second ballot, but was defeated by M. D. K. Taylor, 45 votes to 33. In the Ninth Legislature, Constantine W. Buckley was elected Speaker and served until he apparently resigned on December 7, 1861, at which time Darnell was elected Speaker.

After traveling to Richmond, Virginia, Darnell returned with orders to raise a cavalry regiment. He resigned as Speaker (as well as from the House) to raise the 18th Texas Cavalry.

After serving as Assistant Doorkeeper for the House of Representatives of the 14th Legislature (1874), Darnell was elected from Tarrant County to be a member of the House for the 15th Legislature (1876). Darnell represented Tarrant, Ellis, and Dallas counties in the Texas Constitutional Convention of 1876. He served as Doorkeeper and Assistant Doorkeeper for the 15th (1879) and 16th (1881) Legislatures.

Darnell died July 16, 1885 in Fort Worth and was buried in the Masonic Cemetery in Dallas, and later re-interred in the Pioneer Cemetery.

== Notes ==
Preceded by Unknown	Member of the Tennessee General Assembly; 1837–1838	Succeeded by Unknown
Preceded by Unknown	Member of the Republic of Texas House of Representatives; 1841–1843	Succeeded by Unknown
Preceded by Kenneth Lewis Anderson	Speaker of the Republic of Texas House of Representatives; 1841–1842	Succeeded by Richardson A. Scurry
Preceded by Unknown	Member of the Texas House of Representatives; 1846–1847	Succeeded by Unknown
Preceded by Unknown	Member of the Texas House of Representatives; 1859–1862	Succeeded by Unknown
Preceded by Constantine W. Buckley	Speaker of the Texas House of Representatives; December 7, 1861–1862^{1}	Succeeded by Vacant^{2}
Preceded by Unknown	Member of the Texas House of Representatives; 1876–1879	Succeeded by Unknown
Notes and references
1. Exact date of Darnell's resignation is not known (records are incomplete).; 2. Constantine W. Buckley was most likely elected at the beginning of the First Called Session on February 2, 1863
