= De Witt Clinton Fort =

American politician (1830–1868)

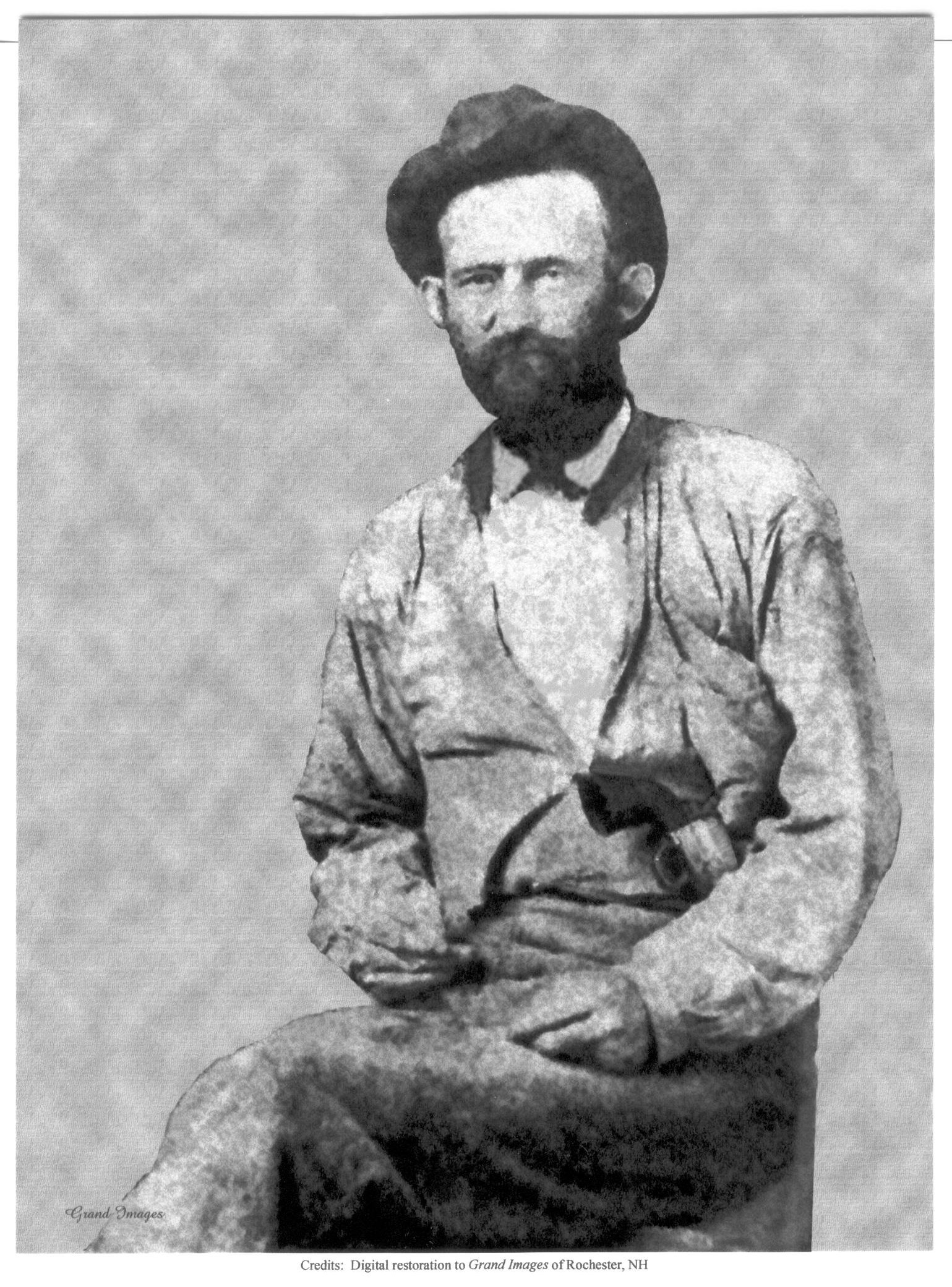
- Born: June 8, 1830; Hardeman County, Tennessee
- Died: May 25, 1868 (aged 37); Hempstead, Texas
- Resting place: Bellville, Texas
- Occupation: Attorney

De Witt Clinton Fort (June 8, 1830, Hardeman County, Tennessee – May 25, 1868, Hempstead, Texas). He was a member of the Texas House of Representatives and soldier in the Confederate army during the American Civil War.

== Background ==
Fort received his A.B. degree from Centre College, Danville, Kentucky in 1850. He was admitted to the practice of law in 1852 in Mississippi and in 1857 in Texas. He was elected to serve in the Eighth Texas Legislature (1859-1861) and the special "Adjourned Session" (March 18, 1861 - April 9, 1861).

Fort closed his Austin County, Texas law office for the duration of the war in June 1861 and paid his own travel expenses to join J.E.B. Stuart's cavalry in Virginia for the First Battle of Manassas. He was captured in Tennessee following the Battle of Farmington in May 1862, but escaped by leaping from a Union prison steamboat into the Mississippi River. Later, he created "Fort's Scouts," a small unit of Confederate Cavalry, acting in concert with General Nathan Bedford Forrest. By the end of the war he had served with the Confederate units in Texas, Virginia, Mississippi, Tennessee and Missouri. He was wounded during the closing weeks of the war. His unit surrendered about one month after General Lee's surrender.

Fort was "clubfooted" and badly crippled from birth and unsuitable for military service. However, by the time he surrendered, his small band had closed down the Memphis & Charleston Railroad to Union military travel and only large Union cavalry patrols would venture outside the Union military headquarters at Memphis, TN.

He carried the sobriquet, Captain "Clubfoot" Fort, C.S.A. proudly.

== See also ==
- Mat Luxton
