= St. Mary's of Aransas, Texas =

Ghost town in Texas, United States

St. Mary's of Aransas is a ghost town near the present community of Bayside in Refugio County, Texas, United States. It served as a settlement and major port until the emergence of Rockport in the late 19th century.

== History ==
St. Mary's of Aransas was founded around 1850, two miles north of the settlement of Black Point, near the port of Copano, by developer Joseph F. Smith. The town soon grew into a major port and became a leading lumber and construction-material center on the Texas coast. Other goods shipped included hides, tallow, cattle, and cotton, which were exchanged via wagon to Refugio, Goliad, Beeville and San Antonio.

During the American Civil War, the port was used by blockade runners, and as a result, federal troops attacked and burned down a warehouse and two wharves. A few leading citizens left the town during the war, including Joseph F. Smith. After the war, the Morgan Lines were connected to the town and would make stops at the port. But after an 1875 Hurricane, and a buildup of wreckage in Copano Bay due to shallow reefs, the lines no longer stopped at the town. St. Mary's was named as the county seat of Refugio County in the 1869 Texas Constitution, but lost the designation to the growing port of Rockport in 1871. In the 1880s, the San Antonio and Aransas Pass Railway was built to Rockport rather than St. Mary's, and an 1886 hurricane destroyed a schoolhouse and the wharves. The town declined further after another storm the next year, and by 1907, the general store and post office were closed.

Between 1909 and 1910, the former site of St. Mary's was annexed by the town of Bayside, which had been founded in 1908, and eventually stretched three and a half miles along Copano Bay from Black Point.

== Notable residents ==
- Philanthropist Clara Driscoll, who is considered the "Savior of the Alamo" due to her efforts with the Daughters of the Republic of Texas to restore and acquire the Alamo Mission in San Antonio from 1903 to 1905, was born at the town in 1881.
- Politician Alfred Marmaduke Hobby established a general store at St. Mary's of Aransas in 1857, and was elected to the Texas House of Representatives two years later. While in the House, he represented the town and advocated states' rights. Hobby fought for the Confederacy during the Civil War, and is noted for the patriotic poems he wrote as a soldier.

== See also ==
- List of ghost towns in Texas
