= J. O. Terrell =

American politician, lawyer, cattleman and banker (1856–1933)

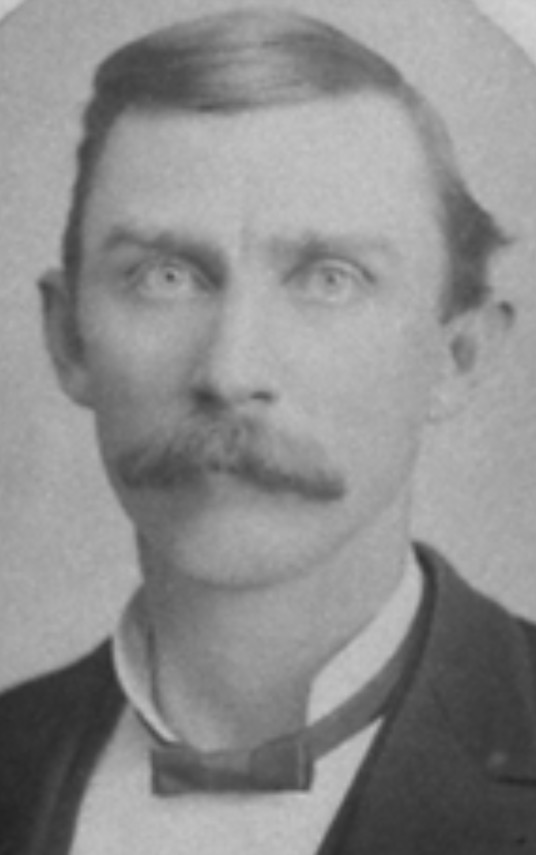
- Terrell's portrait for the 20th Texas Legislature

Member of the Texas Senate from the 16th district
- In office January 13, 1885 – January 8, 1889
- Preceded by: George B. Griggs
- Succeeded by: Robert Snead Kimbrough

President pro tempore of the Texas Senate
- In office March 18, 1887 – March 21, 1887
- Preceded by: Temple Lea Houston
- Succeeded by: John E. Woods

Personal details
- Born: Jonathan Olinthus Terrell; April 6, 1856 Kaufman County, Texas, US
- Died: June 28, 1923 (aged 67) San Antonio, Texas, US
- Party: Republican
- Children: 6, including Chester
- Occupation: Politician, lawyer, cattleman, banker

Jonathan Olinthus Terrell (April 6, 1856 – June 28, 1923) was an American politician, lawyer, cattleman, and banker. A Republican, he was a member of the Texas Senate, serving as president pro tempore of the Texas Senate in 1887.

== Early life and education ==
Terrell was born on April 6, 1856, in Kaufman County, Texas, the son of Jonathan W. Terrell and Amelia (née Love) Terrell. At a young age, he worked as a teamster, later selling oxen. With the money he earned, he studied at Trinity University for two and a half years. He then worked as editor of the Terrell Times-Star. He read law, and in April 1877, was admitted to the bar.

== Career ==
After being admitted to the bar, Terrell began practicing in Kaufman, later moving to Terrell. In 1901, he cofounded the partnership Terrell & Terrell, which expanded into Terrell, Davis, Huff, & McMillan. He later established the partnership J. O. Terrell & Son.

Terrell was a Republican. He was a member of the Texas Senate, from January 13, 1885, to January 8, 1889, representing the 16th district. He was president pro tempore of the Texas Senate, from March 18, to March 21, 1887. He was the unsuccesstul Republican candidate in the 1910 Texas gubernatorial election.

While in the Senate, Terrell was chairman of the Committees on Commerce and Manufactures and on the Judiciary, as well as a member of the Committees on Constitutional Amendments; on Enrolled Bills; on Internal Imorovements: on Penitentiaries; on Public Lands; on Roads and Bridges; and on State Asylums. He supported light tariffs.

In 1895, Terrell moved to San Antonio due to illness. There, he practiced law and raised Jersey cattle that he had imported. At one point, his livestock were one of the largest herds of Jersey cattle in the world. In 1909, he founded the Central Trust Company, a property loaning company. He was acting president of the Texas Surety Company. He was a banker, retiring from the industry in December 1921.

== Personal life and death ==
In December 1877, Terrell married Mattie Simpson, with whom he had six children, including Chester H. Terrell. He was a member of the Methodist Episcopal Church, South, as well as a member of the Knights of Honor and the Knights of Pythias. Physically, a publication described him as "tall and slender, having light hair and blue eyes". He died on June 28, 1923, aged 67, in San Antonio, following a year of illness, and was buried on June 29, in San Antonio.
