= Ira Hobart Evans =

United States Army Medal of Honor recipient (1844–1922)

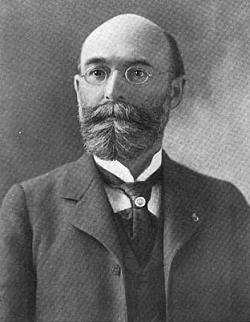

Speaker of the Texas House of Representatives
- In office February 10, 1870 – May 10, 1871
- Preceded by: Nathaniel Macon Burford
- Succeeded by: William H. Sinclair

Member of the Texas House of Representatives from the 30th district
- In office February 9, 1870 – January 14, 1873
- Preceded by: Nelson Plato
- Succeeded by: Henry Addington Gilpin

Personal details
- Born: April 11, 1844 Piermont, New Hampshire, U.S.
- Died: April 19, 1922 (aged 78) San Diego, California, U.S.
- Resting place: Berlin Corners Cemetery, Berlin, Vermont
- Party: Republican
- Spouse(s): Francese A. Hurlbut (m. 1871; div. 1917) Jessie M. Stewart (m. 1920)
- Relations: Timothy Dwight Hobart (cousin)
- Children: 3
- Awards: Medal of Honor

Military service
- Allegiance: United States of America; Union
- Branch/service: United States Army; Union Army
- Years of service: 1862–67
- Rank: Captain; Brevet Major
- Unit: 116th Regiment Infantry U.S. Colored Troops
- Battles/wars: American Civil War

Ira Hobart Evans (April 11, 1844 – April 19, 1922) was an officer in the Union Army during the American Civil War and received the Medal of Honor. He was also a prominent Texas businessman and state legislator who served in the Texas House of Representatives, including as Speaker.

== Early life ==
Evans was born in Piermont, New Hampshire on April 11, 1844. After the death of his father, his mother moved to Barre, Vermont, and he completed his education at Barre Academy.

== Civil War military service ==
In July 1862 he enlisted for the Civil War as a private in Company B, 10th Vermont Volunteer Infantry Regiment. In December 1863 he was commissioned as a first lieutenant in the 9th U.S. Colored Troops. In January 1865 he was promoted to captain in the 116th U.S. Colored Troops.

In March 1865 he was promoted to brevet major "for gallant conduct and meritorious services" and assigned as assistant Adjutant of the XXV Army Corps, Army of the James.

== Medal of Honor action ==
General William Birney, as quoted in 1897's "The Story of American Heroism" compiled by J.W. Jones:

In the early days of April, 1865, when General Grant was moving on Petersburg, my division (the Second of the 25th Corps) held a portion of the Union line near Hatcher's Run. The main body was sheltered by a low ridge from the enemy's fire, but the rifle pits in which the pickets were posted and the open space between the pits and the ridge, was swept by the Confederate cannon and musketry. Confederate deserters were numerous, most of them reaching the rifle pits late at night or about daybreak, where, for their safety, they were detained until nightfall. An afternoon assault on the Confederate works being intended, it was very important to learn what changes had been made in them. I was directed from headquarters to have the newly arrived deserters interviewed. Being unwilling to order any member on my staff on so dangerous a duty, I called for a volunteer. Captain Evans was the only one who responded. Dismounting he passed rapidly over the ridge in front of the division, being at that time the only Union soldier in view from the Confederate line. The enemy opened a sharp fire of musketry upon him, and continued it until he disappeared in one of our rifle pits. Having questioned the deserters and obtained the desired information, he returned through another shower of bullets and reported to me. It was a gallant feat.

== Post-Civil War military service ==
On April 17, 1865, Evans was one of the officers in the honor guard of President Abraham Lincoln's funeral cortège. He remained on active duty after the war, serving in Brownsville, Texas as a member General Philip H. Sheridan's occupation force. In September 1866 he was transferred to New Orleans. In February 1867 he was discharged in Louisville, Kentucky.

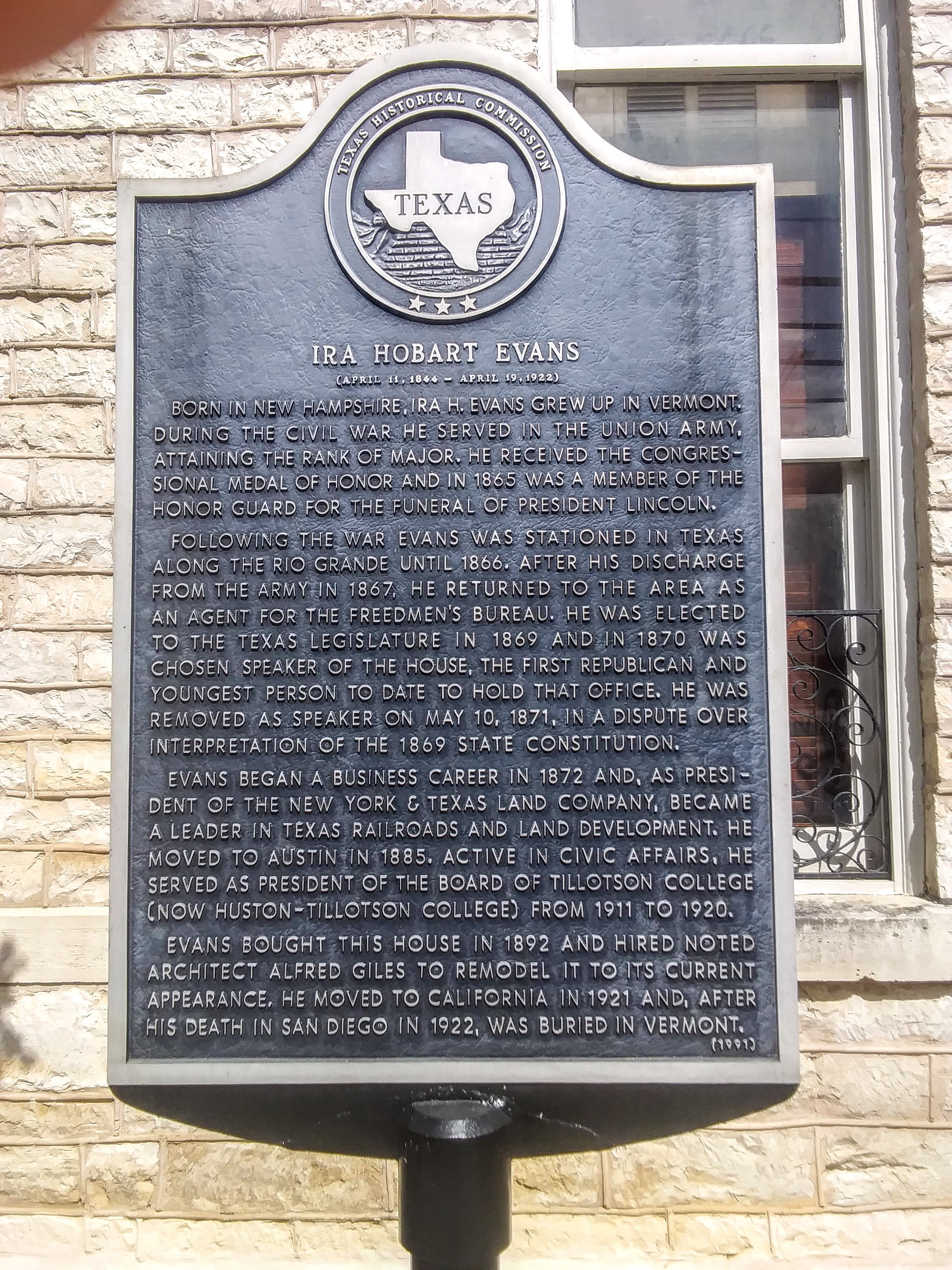
Outside of Ira Hobart Evans' home in Austin, Texas

== Reconstruction in Texas ==
Deciding to take part in the Reconstruction of Texas, he started a ranch near Corpus Christi, but lost his investment through the dishonesty of his partner. Evans then joined the Freedmen's Bureau but quickly resigned out of anger with his superiors, whom he deemed incompetent. He then joined the Internal Revenue Service, first in Eagle Pass and then in Corpus Christi.

== Member of the Texas House of Representatives ==
At the urging of Republican gubernatorial candidate Edmund Jackson Davis, in 1869 Evans ran for and won a seat in the Texas House of Representatives. In 1870 he was elected Speaker of the House (at age 26, he was the youngest person ever to hold that post). Evans was removed from office when Democrats returned to power at the end of Texas Reconstruction in 1871.

== Business career ==
Unlike most Republicans who were active in post-Civil War Reconstruction, Evans did not return to the Northern states after leaving politics, instead settling in Austin and beginning a business career. He became general manager of Houston's Texas Land Company in 1872, and Secretary of the Houston and Great Northern Railroad Company in 1873. After the H. & G. N. merged with the International Railroad in 1874, Evans was elected Secretary of the International-Great Northern Railroad, and served as a member of the board of directors from 1875 to 1908. From 1880 to 1906 he was President of the New York and Texas Land Company. Evans was a founder of the Austin National Bank and served on the board of directors from 1890 until his death. In 1897, he was appointed Receiver of the Austin Rapid Transit Railway Company, a post that he held until 1902. From 1902 to 1903, he was President of the Austin Electric Railway Company. He was also a founder and President of the Texas Life Insurance Company.

== Philanthropy, religious activity and civic involvement ==
Evans maintained a lifelong interest in the cause of educating African Americans, including serving on the board of trustees of Austin's Tillotson College (now Huston–Tillotson University) from 1881 to 1920 and as president of the board from 1909 to 1920. Evans also donated the funds to construct a residence for the president of the college and the funds to create a program to train construction workers. The college's Evans Industrial Building, constructed in 1912 and refurbished in 1984, was named after him and has been designated a Texas Historical Site.

Evans was active in both the Congregational and Presbyterian churches and served as president of the American Home Missionary Society. He was a member of the board of trustees of the First Presbyterian Church in Austin and president of the board of trustees of Austin's First Congregational Church of Austin for five years.

He was also involved in several civic causes. His Austin home was the meeting place for the Texas State Historical Association. He was a member of the Society of Colonial Wars and the Military Order of the Loyal Legion of the United States. In 1896, Evans became a member of the Vermont Society of the Sons of the American Revolution (SAR) and was the founder and first president of the Texas Society of the SAR. He was assigned national member number 2751 and Vermont Society number 51.

Evans's home, the North-Evans Chateau, is now the location of the Austin Woman's Club and is an Austin Historic Landmark.

== Personal life ==
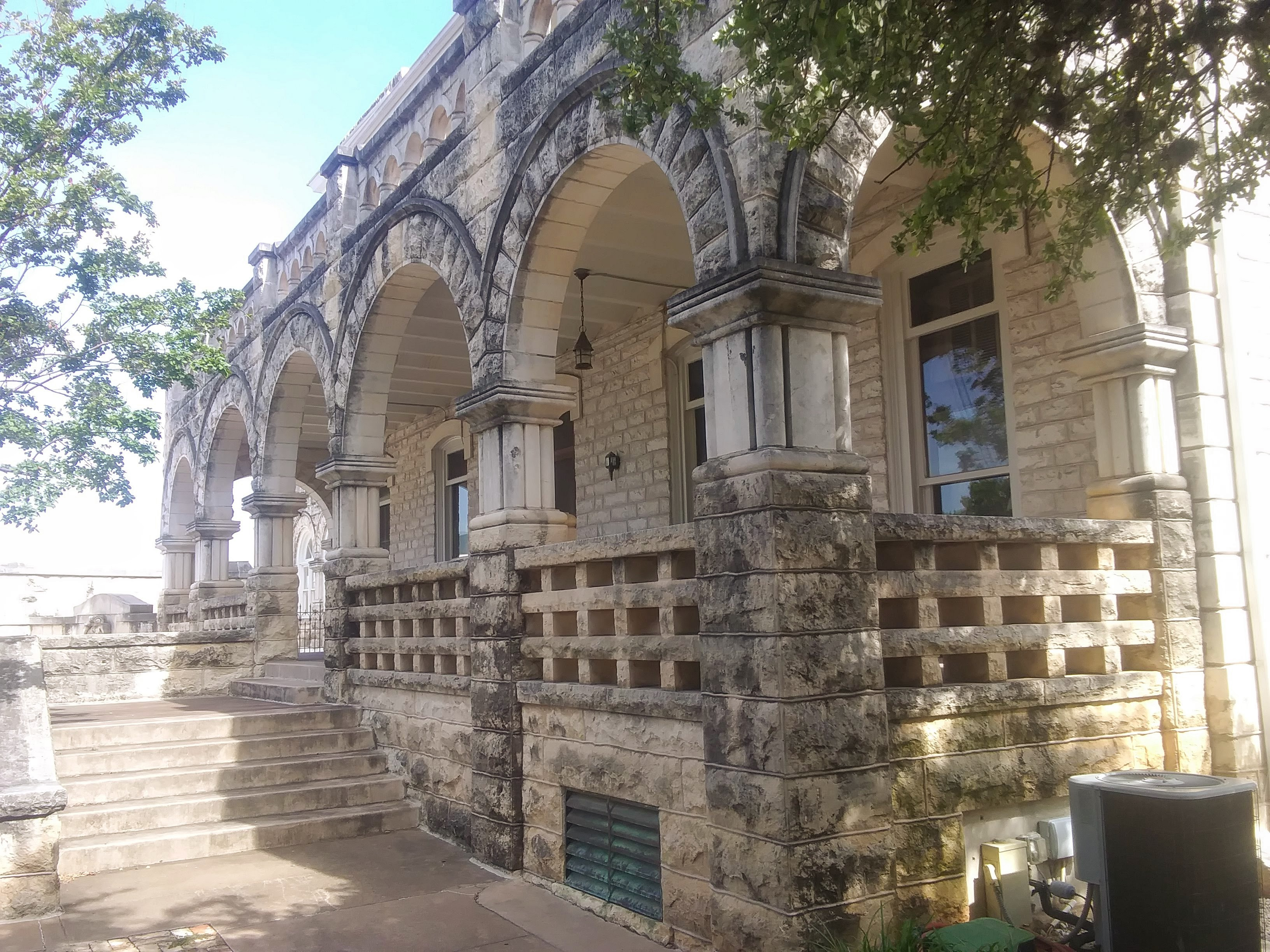
Ira Hobart Evans ~ Château

In July 1871, he married Francese A. Hurlbut of Upper Alton, Illinois, with whom he had three sons, Wilber Leslie Evans, Hobart Yale Evans, and Francis Hurlbut Evans. He and Francine divorced in 1917, and he married Jessie M. Stewart in 1920.

He and Texas businessman Timothy Dwight Hobart were cousins.

The Ira Hobart Evans Papers are part of the University of Tulsa's McFarlin Library.

== Retirement and death ==
Evans retired to San Diego, California, in 1921 and died there on April 19, 1922. He was buried in Berlin Corners Cemetery, Berlin, Vermont.

== Medal of Honor citation ==
Citation: (presented on March 24, 1892)

For extraordinary heroism on 2 April 1865, while serving with Company B, 116th Colored Infantry, in action at Hatcher's Run, Virginia. Captain Evans voluntarily passed between the lines, under a heavy fire from the enemy, and obtained important information.

== See also ==
- List of American Civil War Medal of Honor recipients: A–F
