= William H. Sinclair =

American Union Army officer, businessman, and state legislator (1838–1897)

William Henry Sinclair
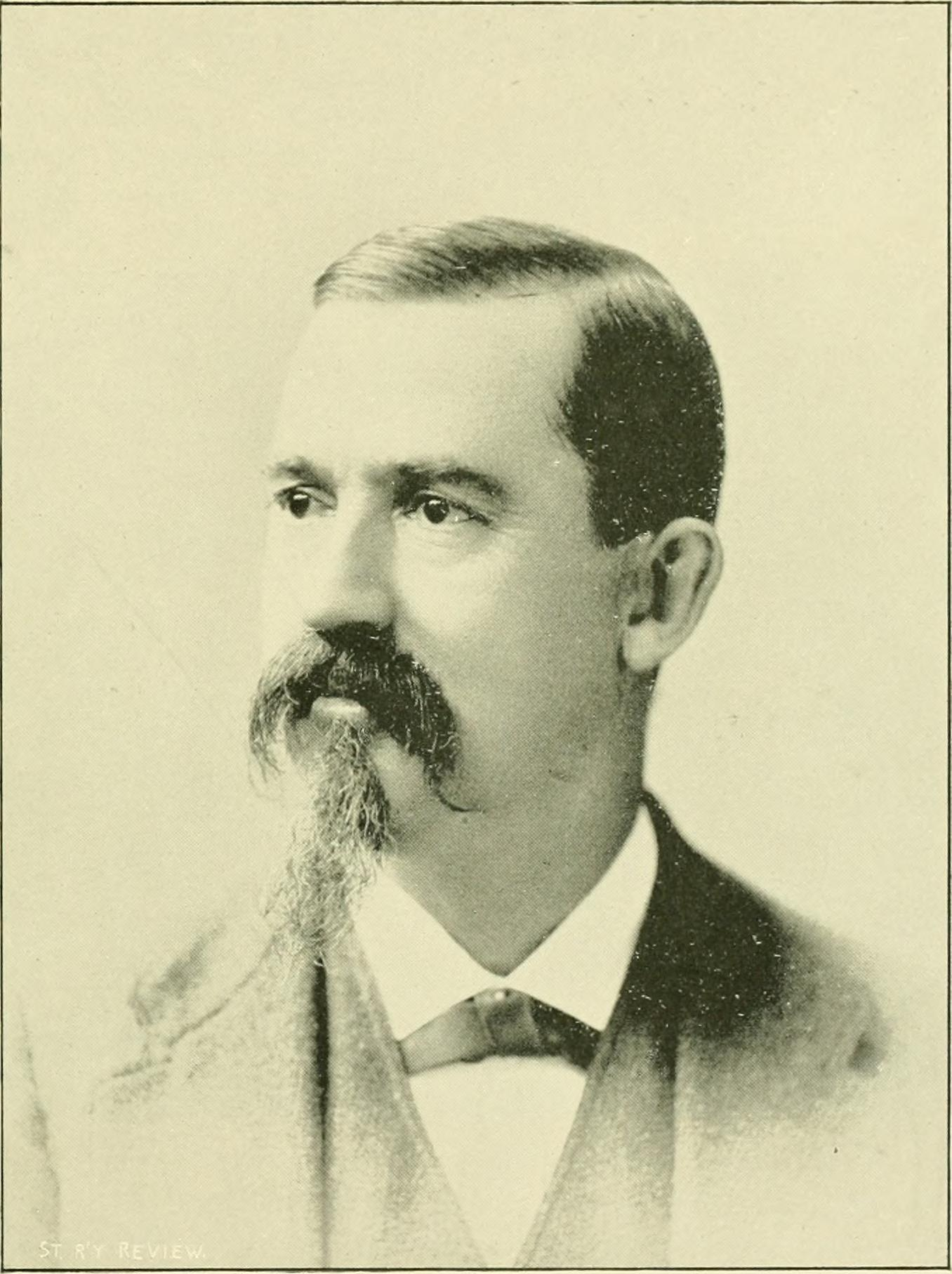

Speaker of the Texas House of Representatives
- In office May 10, 1871 – January 14, 1873
- Preceded by: Ira Hobart Evans
- Succeeded by: M. D. K. Taylor

Member of the Texas House of Representatives from the 12th district
- In office February 8, 1870 – January 14, 1873
- Preceded by: Thomas Reuben Bonner

Personal details
- Born: October 31, 1838 Akron, Ohio, U.S.
- Died: January 11, 1897 (aged 58) Rochester, New York, U.S.
- Resting place: Lakeview Cemetery
- Party: Republican
- Occupation: Businessman; State Representative; Union Officer

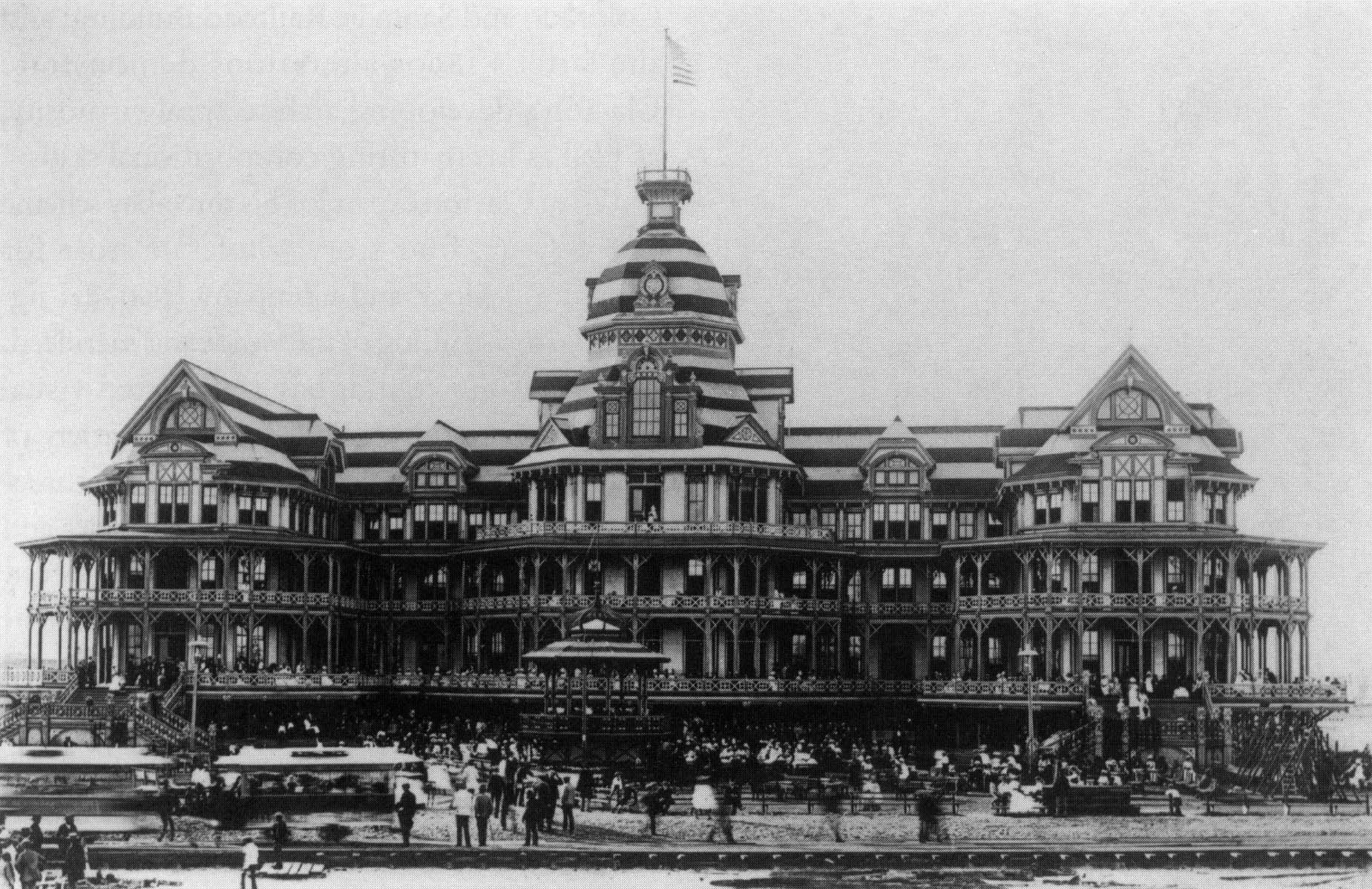
Beach Hotel, on Galveston Beach between Tremont St. and Twenty-fourth St., Galveston.

Col. William H. Sinclair (October 31, 1838 – January 11, 1897) was an American Union Army officer, Freedmen's Bureau official, businessman, state legislator, and union officer. Sinclair founded the Beach Hotel in Galveston in 1882, in an effort to increase tourism in the city. The project cost US$260,000 (US$6,279,000 in 2018).

Sinclair was born in Akron, Ohio.

Sinclair was an avid baseball enthusiast, convincing stockholders to invest in a Texas League baseball franchise in Galveston. He also served as president of the Galveston City Railroad Company.

Sinclair served in the Texas House of Representatives as a Republican representing the 12th district from February 8, 1870 to January 14, 1873. He served as Speaker of the Texas House from May 10, 1871 to January 14, 1873.

Sinclair's wife died in 1895, and in early 1897 Sinclair died in Rochester, New York at the age of 58. On January 17, 1897 he was buried at Lakeview Cemetery in Galveston.

== See also ==
- List of speakers of the Texas House of Representatives
- 12th Texas Legislature
