= John Wesley Marshall =

American politician (1869–1944)

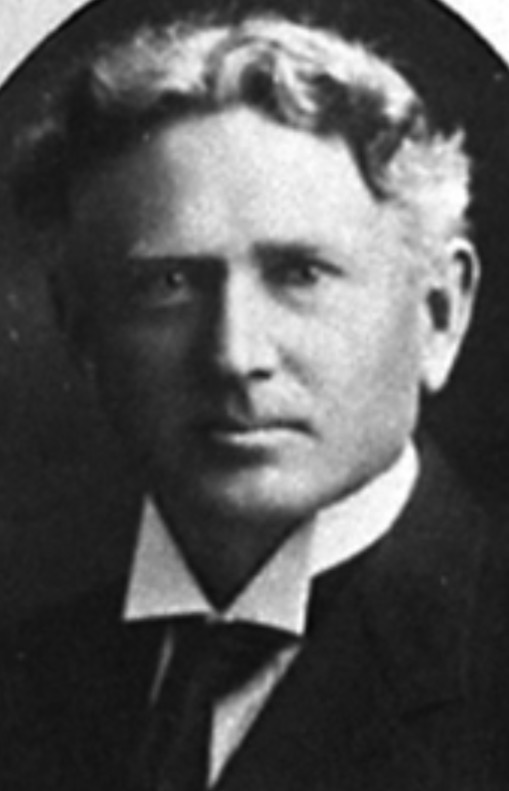
- Marshall's portrait for the 31st Texas Legislature

Member of the Texas House of Representatives from the 35th district
- In office January 12, 1909 – January 10, 1911
- Preceded by: Multi-member district
- Succeeded by: Multi-member district

Speaker of the Texas House of Representatives
- In office March 15, 1909 – January 10, 1911
- Preceded by: Austin Milton Kennedy
- Succeeded by: Sam Rayburn

Personal details
- Born: February 23, 1869 Jacksonville, Texas, US
- Died: November 22, 1944 (aged 75) Denison, Texas, US
- Party: Democratic
- Occupation: Politician

John Wesley Marshall (February 23, 1869 – November 22, 1944) was an American politician. A Democrat, he was a member of the Texas House of Representatives, including a term as Speaker of the House.

== Biography ==
Marshall was born on February 23, 1869, in Jacksonville, Texas, the son of William Henry Marshall and Martha Ann (née Bolton) Marshall. In 1879, he and his parents moved to Whitesboro, where he attended public schools. He worked at his father's hardware store. He helped found the First National Bank of Whitesboro.

Marshall was a Democrat. He was mayor of Whitesboro for two terms. He was a member of the Texas House of Representatives, from January 12, 1909, to January 10, 1911, representing the 35th district. From March 15, 1909, he was Speaker of the House, following the resignation of Austin Milton Kennedy.

During his tenure, Marshall was a member of the Committees on Appropriations; on Banks and Banking; on Internal Improvements; and on Public Lands and Land Office. He was a Prohibitionist. While Speaker, convict leasing was banned in the state.

After serving in the Legislature, Marshall moved to Sherman and became a real estate agent. He headed two trade organizations. For fourteen years, he was chairman of the Kidd-Key College board of trustees. He was later appointed to the Texas Teachers College System board of regents by Governor William P. Hobby.

In 1898, Marshall married Cora Rachel Sears, with whom he did not habe children. She died in 1925, and in 1928, he married Bertha L. Cameron Snodgrass. On November 21, 1944, he and his wife sustained a traffic collision in Denison, with a truck carrying butane, causing an explosion. He died there on November 22, aged 75, from his burns, and was buried in a mausoleum at West Hill Cemetery, in Sherman.
