= Chester H. Terrell =

American politician (1882–1904)

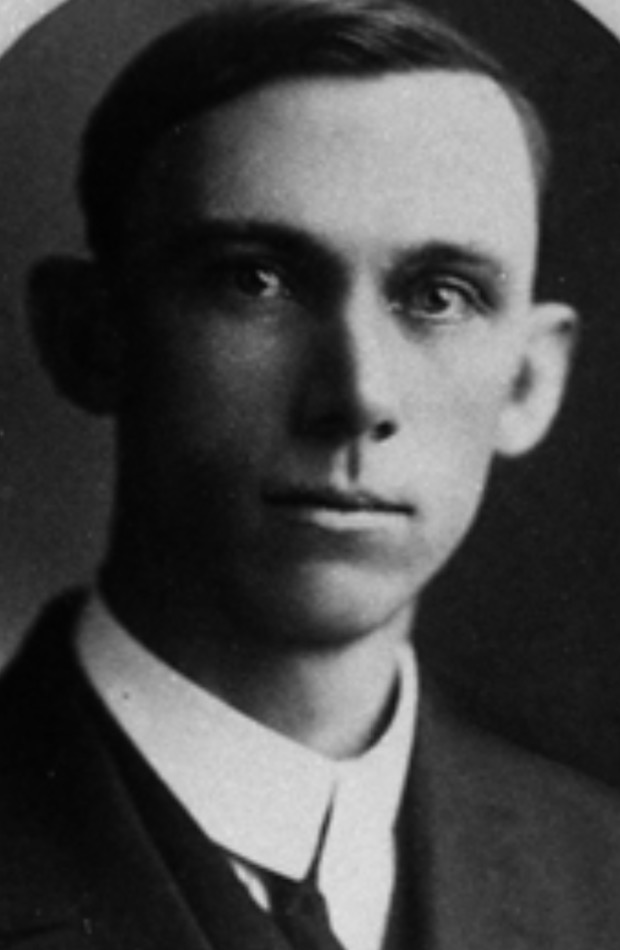
- Terrell's portrait for the 33rd Texas Legislature

Member of the Texas House of Representatives
- In office January 12, 1909 – January 12, 1915
- Preceded by: Mutli-member district
- Succeeded by: Mutli-member district
- Constituency: 92nd district (1909–1913); 85th district (1913–1915)

Speaker of the Texas House of Representatives
- In office January 14, 1913 – January 12, 1915
- Preceded by: Sam Rayburn
- Succeeded by: John William Woods

Personal details
- Born: Chester Hunter Terrell; December 2, 1882 Terrell, Texas, US
- Died: September 13, 1920 (aged 37) San Antonio, Texas, US
- Party: Democratic
- Parent: J. O. Terrell (father)
- Occupation: Politician, lawyer

Chester Hunter Terrell (December 2, 1882 – September 13, 1920) was an American politician and lawyer. A Democrat, he was a member of the Texas House of Representatives, including a term as Speaker of the House.

== Early life, education, and early career ==
Terrell was born on December 2, 1882, in Terrell, Texas; the city was named for his family, though not the branch he was of. He was the son of J. O. Terrell and Mattie (née Simpson) Terrell. In 1895, his family moved to San Antonio.

Terrell was educated at the San Antonio Academy. An attendee of the University of Texas at Austin, he was a member of its varsity baseball team, a member of Chi Phi, and was active in university politics. He graduated in 1904 with a law degree. After graduating, he returned to San Antonio and joined the law partnership Terrell & Terrell, composed of he, his father, and two of his brothers.

== Politics ==
Terrell was a Democrat. He was a member of the Texas House of Representatives from January 12, 1909, to January 12, 1915. In his first two terms, he represented the 92nd district, and in his final term represented the 85th district. He was Speaker of the House from January 14, 1913, to January 12, 1915.

Whiler serving, Terrell was chairman of the Committee on Criminal Jurisprudence, as well as vice-chairman of the Committee on Congressional Districts. He was a member of the Committees on Banks and Banking; on Constitutional Amendments; on Education; on Insurance; on the Judiciary; on Municipal Corporations; on Private Corporations; on Revenue and Taxation; on Senatorial Districts; and on State Asylums.

Ideologically, Terrell was conservative. He opposed Prohibition. While Speaker, he helped pass the state's first laws regulating water pollution. He announced a campaign in the 1916 Texas gubernatorial election, though dropped out in March due to illness. In a 1916 open letter, he advised Franklin Oliver Fuller to impeach Governor James E. Ferguson, which led to the end of his political career. He supported Warren G. Harding in the 1920 United States presidential election.

== Personal life and death ==
On December 23, 1904, Terrell married Gladys Bentley, with whom he had three daughters. He was a Methodist and a member of the Benevolent and Protective Order of Elks. He died on September 13, 1920, aged 37, in San Antonio, following six years of illness, and was buried at Mission Burial Park, in San Antonio.
