= Alfred Marmaduke Hobby =

American politician (1836–1881)

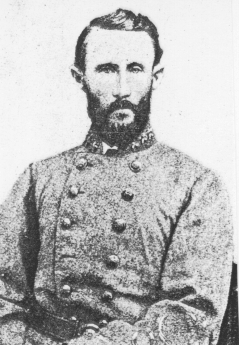
Colonel Alfred Marmaduke Hobby

Alfred Marmaduke Hobby (1836 – February 5, 1881) was a Texas merchant, politician, Confederate officer, and poet. He was born in Macon, Georgia, in 1836, the son of Martin and Anna Elizabeth (Slade) Hobby. Hobby's nephew is William P. Hobby, governor of Texas from 1917 to 1921. His grandnephew William P. Hobby, Jr., was lieutenant governor of Texas 1973-91.

== Early life ==
In the 1850s, Marmaduke Hobby's mother, a widow, moved with her sons to Madison, Florida, and then to Galveston, Texas. Hobby entered a mercantile partnership and established a general store at the new town of St. Mary's of Aransas, Refugio County, about 1857. Although only about twenty-two, he almost immediately became a political leader of the county. Upon the resignation of Henry Lawrence Kinney in 1861, Hobby was elected to the Texas House of Representatives for the Eighth Texas Legislature.

== Secession and Civil War ==
Hobby was an ardent supporter of states rights and organized a chapter of the Knights of the Golden Circle at St. Mary's. At the Secession Convention he represented his district and voted for secession. He was reelected to the Ninth Texas Legislature but resigned to enter the Confederate States Army. On May 14, 1862, Hobby organized the 8th Texas Infantry Battalion and was elected to the rank of major. In the next year the battalion was consolidated with other units to form the 8th Texas Infantry Regiment, with Hobby serving as its colonel. He commanded the Confederate forces at the Battle of Corpus Christi, repelling a Union invasion.

In one incident, Colonel Hobby destroyed the lighthouse at Bolivar Point across from Galveston. This set up a surprise attack wherein the Confederate Texans won a great victory with the Neptune ramming the Harriet Lane, named in honor of President Buchanan's niece. The Union ship was forced to surrender.

While stationed at Galveston during the war, Hobby married a widow, Mrs. Gertrude Menard. During the war he wrote several patriotic poems. These, including "The Sentinel's Dream of Home," were widely published in newspapers of the period. After the war, he devoted himself more seriously to literary work. His best-known prose was his Life of David G. Burnet (1871). Serfs of Chattenay and Miscellaneous Poems (ca. 1881) contained his "Poem in Honor of Colonel Thomas S. Lubbock." After the war Hobby disposed of his Refugio County holdings and settled at Galveston, where he resumed the mercantile business. He spent the last years of his life in Silver City, New Mexico.

== Death ==
Hobby died in New Mexico on February 5, 1881, in a wagon accident near Mimbres Creek.

Hobby had no children; although his wife had children from her earlier marriage.

== See also ==
Preceded by Henry L. Kinney	Member of the Texas House of Representatives from District 65 (St. Mary's of Aransas); March 19, 1861–after November 4, 1861	Succeeded by Washington Edmund Goodrich
