= Beach Hotel (Galveston) =

Seasonal resort in Texas

The Beach Hotel
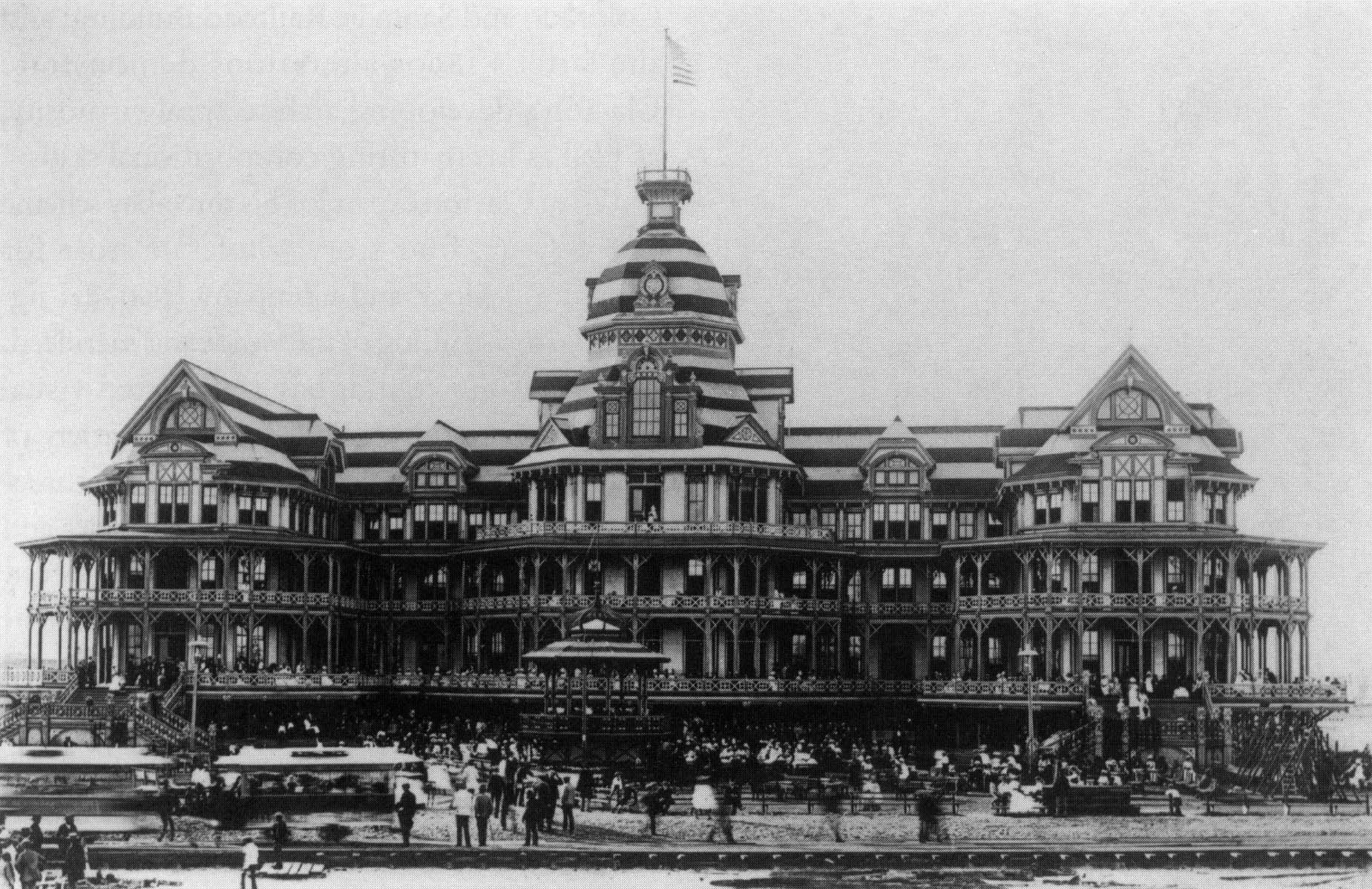
- Interactive map of the The Beach Hotel area

General information
- Type: Wood-frame hotel
- Location: Galveston, Texas
- Coordinates: 29°17′20″N 94°47′19″W
- Completed: 1882
- Demolished: 1898
- Owner: William H. Sinclair

Technical details
- Floor count: 4.5

Design and construction
- Architect: Nicholas J. Clayton

The Beach Hotel was a seasonal resort in Galveston, Texas. Designed by architect Nicholas J. Clayton, it was built in 1882 at a price of US$260,000 (US$8.67 million in today's terms) to cater to vacationers. Owned by William H. Sinclair, the hotel opened on July 4, 1883, and was destroyed by a mysterious fire in 1898.

The front lawn of the beach hotel "provided a site for summer entertainment-fireworks, high-wire walkers, and bands."

== Specifications ==
The 4 1/2-story hotel was built atop 300 cedar piles driven into the sand. The roof had an octagonal dome, which housed the water tanks, and was painted in large red and white stripes, and the eaves were trimmed in a golden green.

== Amenities ==
The following were some of the attributes of the hotel.

- Dining room
- Gentlemen's parlor
- Reading room
- Saloon
- Grand staircase
- Electric and gas lighting

== Sewage ==
In 1898, the Beach Hotel was discovered to have been flushing its cesspools via pipe into the Gulf of Mexico. The city health official regarded this practice as "absolutely disgusting and disgraceful" and refused to allow the hotel to open until it connected to the city's sewage system. In the interim before the hotel connected, it mysteriously burned down.

== Fire ==
The hotel was destroyed by fire lasting 25 minutes in 1898. The fire trucks had a problem reaching the hotel because of the beach's sand. The cause of the fire was never determined. At least one person, a musician, was reported dead from the incident.

== Hurricane ==
While a Wall Street Journal report on September 25, 1900, claimed the hotel had been rebuilt following the 1898 fire and subsequently destroyed in the Great Storm with the loss of 300 guests, this is not supported by local records. Contemporary sources from the Galveston Historical Foundation and the Rosenberg Library confirm the hotel was never rebuilt; the site remained vacant until the construction of later landmarks like the Hotel Galvez in 1911.
