= Nathaniel Macon Burford =

American judge (1824–1898)

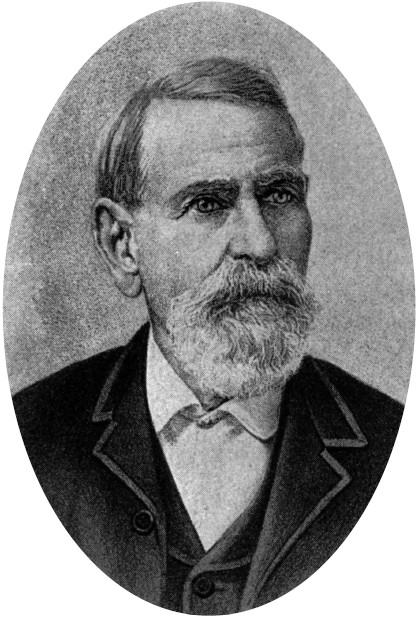

Speaker of the Texas House of Representatives
- In office August 6. 1866 – April 25, 1869

Member of the Texas House of Representatives
- In office August 6, 1866 – April 25, 1869

Personal details
- Born: June 24, 1824 Smith County, Tennessee, US
- Died: May 10, 1898 (aged 73) Dallas, Texas, US
- Resting place: Greenwood Cemetery, Dallas, Texas
- Spouse: Mary Jane Knight
- Education: Irving College

Military service
- Allegiance: Confederate States of America
- Branch/service: Confederate States Army
- Years of service: 1861–1864
- Rank: Colonel
- Unit: 19th Texas Cavalry Regiment
- Battles/wars: American Civil War

Nathaniel Macon Burford (June 24, 1824 – May 10, 1898) was an American politician in Texas who served as Speaker of the Texas House of Representatives between 1866 and 1869. Burford was also an attorney and a state district judge, and during the Civil War, he raised and led the 19th Texas Cavalry Regiment.

== Biography ==
Burford was born to Nancy McAlister and John Hawkins Burford on June 24, 1824, in Smith County, Tennessee. He taught school at age seventeen, and later graduated from Irving College in McMinnville in 1845. He studied law in McMinnville and was accepted into the bar in 1846. At the outbreak of the Mexican–American War, Burford travelled to Knoxville to enlist, but was turned down because Tennessee's quota of troops had already been filled. After a sojourn to Shreveport, Louisiana, Burford ended up in Jefferson, Texas, in early 1847 where he clerked in the Cass County district court. Finding the local bar too full for his ambitions, he moved on to Dallas in 1848 with $5 in his pocket and letters of recommendation from, among others, Gov. J. Pinckney Henderson.

He formed a law partnership with John H. Reagan, and, later, was elected district attorney in 1850 and re-elected in 1852. In 1850, he was one of the founding members of the Tannehill Masonic Lodge #52 in Dallas and its first Master. On January 18, 1854, Burford married fellow Tennessean Mary J. Knight. Knight was the daughter of O. W. Knight, an early pioneer of Dallas County. Together, Mary and Nathaniel would have some five children.

In 1856 Burford was selected as judge of the new 16th Judicial District, seated in Waxahachie, a post he would resign in 1861 to fight in the Civil War. He enlisted in Good's Texas Battery commanded by Capt. John Jay Good as a private. In 1862, however, Burford raised the 19th Texas Cavalry regiment and was elected as its colonel. The 19th Texas was a part of the Trans-Mississippi Department for the duration of the war. After the 1864 Red River Campaign, Burford resigned, believing that he was not suitable to properly lead troops into battle.

He returned to private practice and, in 1866, was elected to the House of Representatives of the Eleventh Texas Legislature. Burford was elected Speaker, 39 votes to 30 for Ashbel Smith. On April 25, 1869, Gen. Philip H. Sheridan declared all elective offices in Texas vacant, ending Burford's legislative career.

Burford was elected presiding judge of Dallas County in 1874 and judge for the 11th Judicial District in 1876, resigning the following year due to health problems. He served as a United States commissioner from 1879 to 1881.

Burford died May 10, 1898, in Dallas and is buried in the Greenwood Cemetery there. Burford was an Episcopalian.

== Notes ==
Preceded by Unknown	Member of the Texas House of Representatives; 1866–1869	Succeeded by Unknown
Preceded by Constantine W. Buckley	Speaker of the Texas House of Representatives; August 6, 1866 – April 25, 1869	Succeeded by Vacant^{1}
Notes and references
1. Federal military officials declared all elective office vacant as of April 25, 1869. Ira Hobart Evans was elected Speaker at the beginning of the Twelfth Texas Legislature
