= Timothy Dwight Hobart =

American businessman and mayor

Mayor of Pampa, Texas
- In office November 1927 – April 1928
- Preceded by: F. P. Reid
- Succeeded by: D. W. Osborne

Personal details
- Born: October 6, 1855 Berlin, Vermont, U.S.
- Died: May 19, 1935 (aged 79) Pampa, Texas, U.S.
- Cause of death: Pneumonia
- Resting place: Fairview Cemetery in Pampa, Texas
- Party: Republican (national) Democrat (state level) Non-partisan as mayor
- Spouse: Minnie Wood Warren Hobart (married 1888-1935, his death)
- Relations: Ira Hobart Evans (cousin)
- Children: 4
- Occupation: Businessman; Landowner; Rancher

Timothy Dwight Hobart (October 6, 1855 – May 19, 1935) was an American businessman, best known as the manager of the JA Ranch. He was also mayor of Pampa, Texas.
