= Franklin Oliver Fuller =

American politician and lawyer (1873–1934)

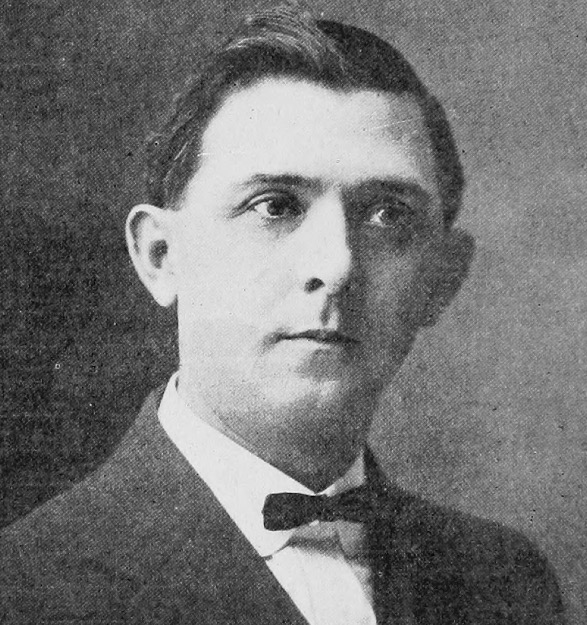

Speaker of the Texas House of Representatives
- In office January 9, 1917 – December 4, 1918
- Preceded by: John William Woods
- Succeeded by: R. Ewing Thomason

Member of the Texas House of Representatives
- In office January 8, 1907 – January 10, 1911
- Preceded by: Multi-member district
- Succeeded by: Multi-member district
- Constituency: 19th district
- In office January 14, 1913 – December 4, 1918
- Preceded by: Benjamin Franklin Cathey
- Succeeded by: Multi-member district
- Constituency: 11th district

Personal details
- Born: November 2, 1873 Melrose, Texas, US
- Died: August 9, 1934 (aged 60) Houston, Texas, US
- Party: Democratic
- Relations: Ralph Wallace (great-grandson)
- Occupation: Politician, lawyer

Franklin Oliver Fuller (November 2, 1873 – August 9, 1934) was an American politician and lawyer. A Democrat, he was a member of the Texas House of Representatives, including a term as Speaker of the House.

== Early life and education ==
Fuller was born on November 2, 1873, in Melrose, Texas, a settlement in Nacogdoches County, the son of Benjamin Franklin Fuller and Josephine (née Green) Fuller. Educated at public schools, he studied at Sam Houston State University and Southern Normal University. He graduated from the former in 1901, with a Bachelor of Laws, and from the latter in 1903, earning a Bachelor of Arts.

== Career ==
From 1894 to 1904, Fuller was a schoolteacher, working in Nacogdoches, San Augustine, San Jacinto, and Walker Counties. He also served as principal of schools in Coldspring and Oakhurst. In 1901, he was admitted to the bar in Tennessee, after which he began practicing in Coldspring. From 1904 to 1906 was district attorney of San Jacinto County.

Fuller was a Democrat. He was a member of the Texas House of Representatives, from January 8, 1907, to January 10, 1911, and again from January 14, 1913, to December 4, 1918. He served as Speaker of the House, from January 9, 1917, until the end of his tenure. He represented the 19th district from 1907 to 1911, then represented the 11th district from 1913 to 1918. Ideologically, he was liberal.

Fuller declined running in the 32nd Texas Legislature in order to handle issues with his businesses. He was unanimously elected Speaker of the House. As Speaker, he conflicted with Governor James E. Ferguson on the issue of Prohibition, with Fuller being for it. On August 1, 1918, he called a special session to impeach Ferguson – an unconstitutional act – which led to Ferguson's resignation.

While in the House, Fuller was chairman of the Committees on Forestry; on Liquor Traffic; and on Private Corporations. He was a member of the Committees on Banks and Banking; on Common Carriers; on Criminal Jurisprudence; on Counties; on Examination of Comptroller's and Treasurer's Accounts; on Federal Relations; on Insurance; on Judicial Districts; on the Judiciary; on Penitentiaries; on Reforms in Civil and Criminal Procedure; and on Rules.

During World War I, Fuller was chairman of the San Jacinto County Council of Defense. From October to December 1918, he was a captain in the United States Army Judge Advocate General's Corps, being part of a group of 200 lawyers who were planned to be sent to Europe, but were ultimately not. He served in the Texas Military Forces, under Jacob Franklin Wolters.

In 1920, Fuller moved to Houston, where he practiced law. He was a member of the partnership Fuller & Fuller, with his son, E. E. Fuller. He was an unsuccessful candidate in the 1926 Texas lieutenant gubernatorial election.

== Personal life and death ==
On April 28, 1895, Fuller married Lizzie Holt, with whom he had five children. He was a Baptist, as well as a member of the Freemasons. He died on August 9, 1934, aged 60, in Houston. He was buried at Hollywood Cemetery, in Houston. His great-grandson was Ralph Wallace.
