= Manford Act of 1943 =

Texas statute

Texas House Bill 100, also known as the Manford Act of 1943, is a Texas Statute that placed labor unions under state regulation in Texas. It was named after Thomas Durwood Manford Jr., the author of the Act. The U.S. Supreme Court ruled in Thomas v. Collins in 1945 that the law violated the right to freedom of expression.

== Background ==
The Manford Act was the state's first attempt to regulate labor unions. The law required all union organizers to obtain a license and register with the Texas Secretary of State. To qualify for a license, an organizer must have lived in the state for one year. It also prohibited exorbitant initiation fees and required unions to file annual reports with the state for both revenues and expenditures. The Act was introduced by Thomas Durwood Manford Jr. in 1943 and became law without the signature of then Governor Coke Stevenson the same year.

== Challenges ==
The first challenge to the law was in 1943. R. J. Thomas, president of the United Auto Workers, violated a temporary restraining order which forbade him from soliciting union members without a license. He was held in content and sentenced to three days in jail. Thomas was let out of jail on a write of habeas corpus, and was later acquitted in November of 1943. The National Labor Relations Board challenged the Act after the acquittal. The case, Thomas v. Collins, was heard before the United States Supreme Court where in 1945 it was found to have violated Thomas's right to freedom of expression.
