= Thomas Bell Love =

American politician and lawyer (1870–1948)

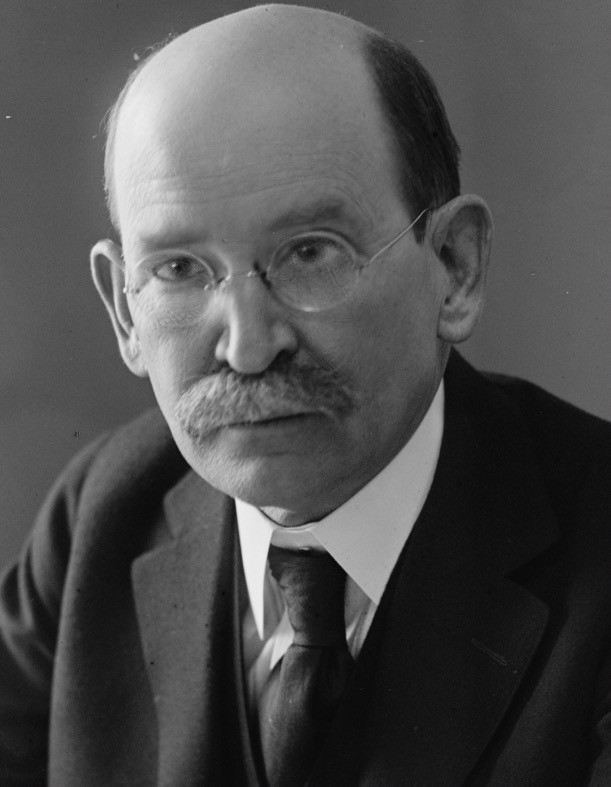
- 1918 Harris & Ewing portrait of Love

Member of the Texas House of Representatives from the 37th district
- In office January 13, 1903 – August 31, 1907 Serving with George B. Griggs; Curtis Hancock; Joseph Sale Strother
- Preceded by: Multi-member district
- Succeeded by: Multi-member district

Speaker of the Texas House of Representatives
- In office January 8, 1907 – August 31, 1907
- Preceded by: Francis William Seabury
- Succeeded by: Austin Milton Kennedy

Member of the Texas Senate from the 11th district
- In office January 11, 1927 – January 13, 1931
- Preceded by: John Davis
- Succeeded by: George Clark Purl

Texas Insurance Commissioner
- In office 1907–1910
- Preceded by: Robert Teague Milner

United States Assistant Secretary of the Treasury
- In office December 15, 1917 – January 31, 1919
- Preceded by: Russell Cornell Leffingwell
- Succeeded by: Albert Rathbone

Personal details
- Born: June 23, 1870 Webster County, Missouri, US
- Died: September 17, 1948 (aged 78) Dallas, Texas, US
- Party: Democratic
- Occupation: Politician, lawyer

Thomas Bell Love (June 23, 1870 – September 17, 1948) was an American politician and lawyer. A Democrat, he was a member of both branches of the Texas Legislature, including a term as Speaker of the Texas House. He later was United States Assistant Secretary of the Treasury.

== Early life and education ==
Love was born on June 23, 1870, in Webster County, Missouri, the son of Thomas Calvin Love and Sarah Jane (née Rodgers) Love. Educated at local public schools, he graduated from Drury University in 1891, with a Bachelor of Science. In 1919, he received a law degree from the University of Virginia.

== Career ==
=== Early law career ===
While in college, Love read law and was admitted to the bar, after which he began practicing in Springfield, with specialty as an insurance lawyer. From 1892 to 1894, he served as its city attorney, and at one point was a member of a hospital's board of managers.

In 1899, Love moved to Dallas, where he continued practicing law. Also an insurance executive, he was vice-president of the International Travelers Assurance Company, consul and vice-president of the Southwestern Life Insurance Company, and president of the Western Indemnity Company. He later lived in Lancaster.

=== Electoral politics ===
Love was a Democrat. From 1896 to 1898, he was secretary of the Missouri Democratic central committee. He was a member of the Texas House of Representatives, from January 13, 1903, to August 31, 1907, representing the 37th district. From January 8, 1907, he was Speaker of the House. In 1905 and 1907, he helped reform Texas's banking and tax codes. He also helped pass the Terrell Election Law.

Love was chairman of the Committee on Private Corporations, as well as a member of the Committees on Constitutional Amendments; on Federal Relations; on Insurance, Statistics and History; on Internal Improvements; on the Judiciary; on Municipal Corporations; on Penitentiaries; on Privileges, Suffrage and Elections; and on Revenue and Taxation.

From 1907, until his resignation in 1910, Love was commissioner of the Texas Department of Insurance, having been appointed by Governor Thomas Mitchell Campbell. After resigning, he practiced law in Dallas and worked with the Southwestern Life Insurance Company and the Western Indemnity Company.

In 1911, Love was a leader in the campaign for Prohibition. He was an alternate delegate to the 1912 Democratic National Convention. An early supporter of President Woodrow Wilson, he was United States Assistant Secretary of the Treasury, from December 15, 1917, to January 31, 1919. From 1920 to 1924, he was a member of the Democratic National Committee, resigning due to his opposition to gubernatorial candidate Miriam A. Ferguson. In 1928, he opposed Presidential candidate Al Smith, instead campaigning for Herbert Hoover.

Love was an unsuccessful candidate in the 1930 Texas gubernatorial election, his loss being pinned on his party disloyalty. He later moved to Washington, D.C., where he practiced law. In 1933, he helped draft the 1933 Banking Act.

Love was a member of the Texas Senate, from January 11, 1927, to January 13, 1931, representing the 11th district. While serving, he was chairman of the Committees on Federal Relations; and on Internal Improvements, as well as vice-chairman of the Committee on Public Printing; and on Military Affairs. He was a member of the Committees on Civil Jurisprudence; on Educational Affairs; on Highways and Motor Traffic; on Privileges and Elections; on Public Buildings and Grounds; on Representative Districts; on Senatorial Districts; and on State Institutions and Departments.

== Personal life and death ==
On June 11, 1892, Love married Mattie Roberta Goode, with whom he had three children. He was a Methodist, as well as a member of the Benevolent and Protective Order of Elks, the Freemasons, the Independent Order of Odd Fellows, the Modern Woodmen of America, and the Woodmen of the World. He died on September 17, 1948, aged 78, in Dallas, from an intracranial hemorrhage and several strokes, beginning on September 15. He was buried at Sparkman-Hillcrest Memorial Park Cemetery, in Dallas.
