= Francis William Seabury =

American politician and lawyer (1868–1946)

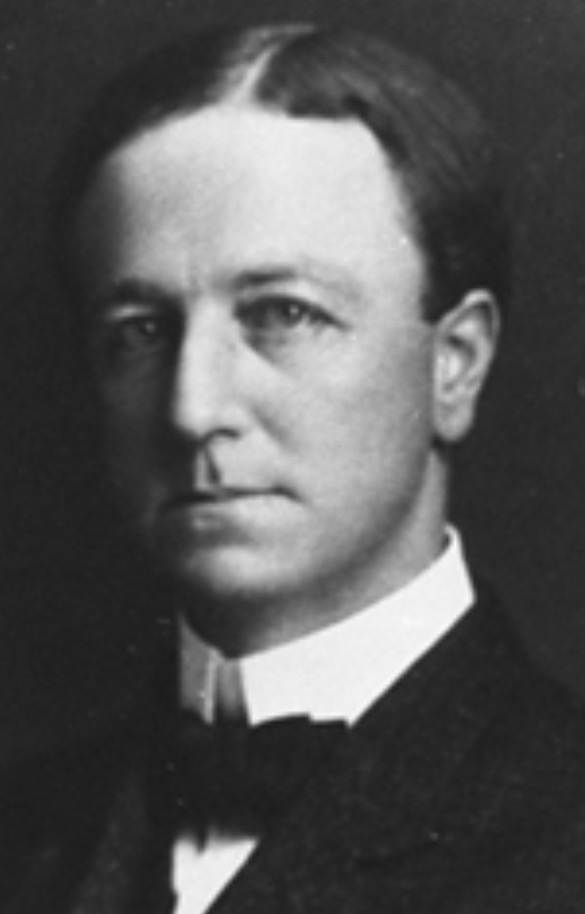
- Seabury's portrait for the 29th Texas Legislature

Member of the Texas House of Representatives from the 85th district
- In office January 8, 1895 – January 10, 1899
- Preceded by: Thomas W. Kennedy; William Jarvis Russell Jr.
- Succeeded by: John Robert Monroe; William Jarvis Russell Jr.
- In office January 8, 1901 – January 8, 1907
- Preceded by: John Robert Monroe; William Jarvis Russell Jr.
- Succeeded by: M. G. Jackson

38th Speaker of the Texas House of Representatives
- In office January 10, 1905 – January 8, 1907
- Preceded by: Pat Morris Neff
- Succeeded by: Thomas Bell Love

Personal details
- Born: May 10, 1868 Norfolk, Virginia, US
- Died: February 6, 1946 (aged 77) Almeda, Houston, Texas, US
- Party: Democratic
- Relations: Samuel Seabury
- Occupation: Politician, lawyer

Francis William Seabury (May 10, 1868 – February 6, 1946) was an American politician and lawyer. A Democrat, he served in the Texas House of Representatives, including a term as Speaker of the House.

== Early life and education ==
Seabury was born on May 10, 1868, in Norfolk, Virginia, one of the five children born to William H. Seabury and Martha Maria (née Hicks) Seabury. He was related to judge Samuel Seabury. He was educated at Norfolk Academy, and in 1888, graduated from the University of Virginia. In the two years that followed his graduation, he worked as a private tutor in Leesburg and as a schoolteacher in Culpeper.

== Career ==
In 1900, Seabury moved to Brownsville, Texas, reading law there under James D. Wells. In 1891, he was admitted to the bar, after which he practiced law in Brownsville until 1895. In 1894, he was the city attorney of Brownsville.

In 1895, Seabury moved to Rio Grande City, where he established the partnership Monroe & Seabury, one of the most successful in South Texas at the time. From 1899 to 1901, he was the district attorney of Starr County. He was also a member of the county board of school examiners.

Seabury was a Democrat. He was a member of the Texas House of Representatives, from the 85th district. He served from January 8, 1895, to January 10, 1899, and again from January 8, 1901, to January 8, 1907. He was Speaker of the House from January 10, 1905, to January 8, 1907.

While serving, Seabury was chairman of the Committee on Mining and Minerals, as well as a member of the Committees on County Government and County Finances; on Enrolled Bills; on Irrigation; on the Judiciary; on Military Affairs; on Penitentiaries; on Public Buildings and Grounds; and on Rules. He had been referred to as "the finest parliamentarian in the house" and the "Democrat of the original faith". Banking laws were primarily introduced and passed during his term, including a successful 1904 amendment state constitutional which allowed for state-operated banks.

After serving in the House, Seabury continued his tenure as attorney of Starr County, serving from 1907 to 1910. In 1909, he returned to Brownsville, where he practiced law until retiring in 1945. He was a member of the Board of Texas Legal Examiners from 1911 to 1915.

== Personal life and death ==
On September 25, 1901, Seabury married Margaret Cater; they had four children together. He was fluent in Spanish, often writing political articles in the language. He was also Anglican. He died on February 6, 1946, aged 77, at the Keightly Hospital in Almeda, Houston, which he was visiting for a trip. His death was caused by myocarditis, itself caused by a intracerebral hemorrhage. He was buried at Buena Vista Burial Park, in Brownsville. An archive of his papers is held by the Dolph Briscoe Center for American History.
