= Jonathon D. Rudd =

American planter and politician (1840–1920)

Jonathon Davenport Rudd (February 17, 1840 – April 26, 1920) was an American planter and politician who served four terms in the Texas Legislature. He fought in the American Civil War as a lieutenant in the Confederate States Army. In the post-war Reconstruction era, he helped organize the Citizens Party and worked to reverse the political gains African Americans had made.

== Early life ==
Rudd was born in Newberry, South Carolina, to Daniel and Elizabeth (née Davenport) Rudd. Orphaned at 16, he later moved to Texas with 25-30 inherited slaves and established the Bermuda Farm Plantation near Waskom.

== Civil War ==
When the Civil War broke out in 1861, Rudd served as a lieutenant in Company G, 14th Texas Cavalry Regiment. He was wounded at the Battle of Allatoona in Georgia.

== After the war ==
After the end of the war in 1865, he returned to his plantation and married his cousin Leonora T. Hill. He became a noted cattle breeder.

Rudd helped organize the Citizens Party in Harrison County, Texas, in 1878 to restore white control after Republicans came to power during the Reconstruction era, and African Americans—Mitchell Kendall, Meshack Roberts, and others—represented the county in the state house. Rudd served as Democratic county chairman and county commissioner; during his term, the 1878 election was marred by fraud and intimidation of African American voters. He himself was elected to four consecutive terms in the Texas Legislature, from January 13, 1891, to January 10, 1899, as a Democrat.

Rudd died at the age of 80.
