= 26th Texas Legislature =

The 26th Texas Legislature met from January 10, 1899, to May 27, 1899, and again in a special called session from January 23, 1900, to February 21, 1900.
