= 1926 Texas lieutenant gubernatorial election =

- November 2, 1926
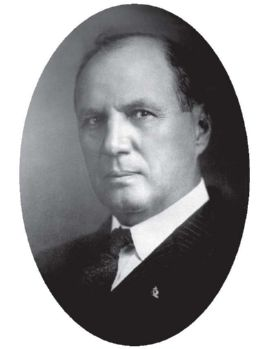

Nominee	Barry Miller	W. H. Holmes
Party	Democratic	Republican
Popular vote	237,025	27,414
Percentage	89.39%	10.34%
Lieutenant Governor before election
Barry Miller
Democratic
Elected Lieutenant Governor
Barry Miller
Democratic

The 1926 Texas lieutenant gubernatorial election was held on November 2, 1926, in order to elect the lieutenant governor of Texas. Incumbent Democratic lieutenant governor Barry Miller defeated Republican nominee W. H. Holmes and Socialist nominee Lee L. Rhodes.

== General election ==
On election day, November 2, 1926, incumbent Democratic lieutenant governor Barry Miller won re-election by a margin of 209,611 votes against his foremost opponent Republican nominee W. H. Holmes, thereby retaining Democratic control over the office of lieutenant governor. Miller was sworn in for his second term on January 18, 1927.

=== Results ===
Texas lieutenant gubernatorial election, 1926
Party	Candidate	Votes	%
Democratic	Barry Miller (incumbent)	237,025	89.39
Republican	W. H. Holmes	27,414	10.34
Socialist	Lee L. Rhodes	709	0.27
Total votes		265,148	100.00
Democratic hold			
