= L. Travis Dashiell =

American politician and lawyer (1869–1924)

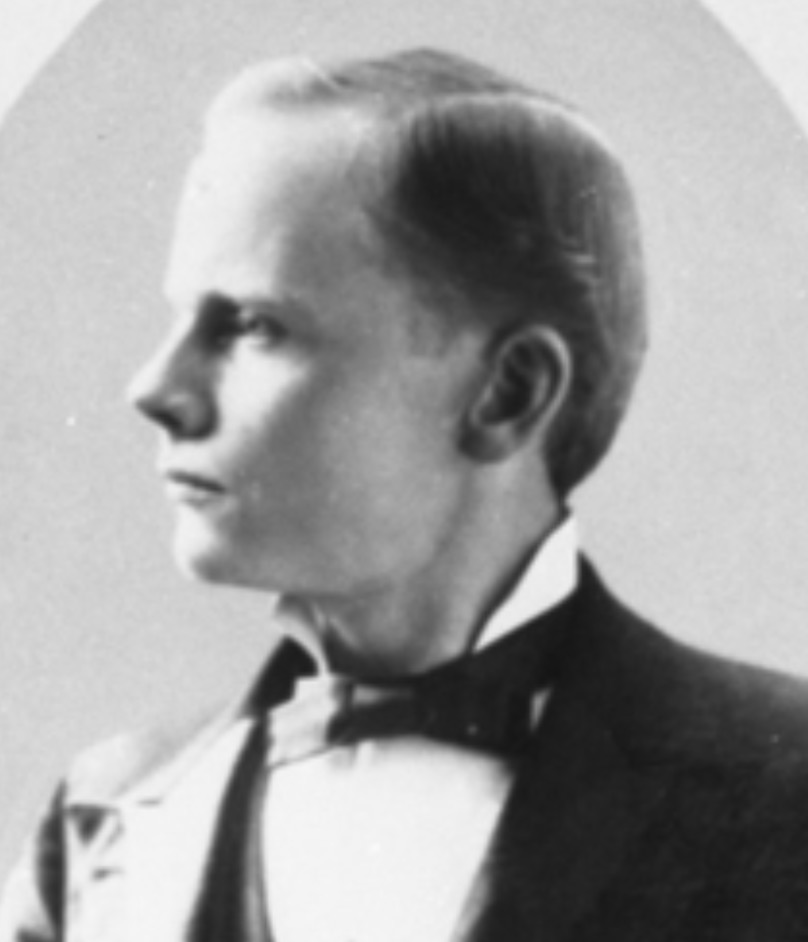
- Dashiell's portrait for the 25th Texas Legislature

Member of the Texas House of Representatives
- In office January 10, 1893 – January 10, 1899
- Preceded by: Rufus Young King (56th); John Addison Wayland (64th)
- Succeeded by: Joseph Fontaine Randolph (56th); Henry Ezekial Ellis (64th)
- Constituency: 56th (1893–1897); 64th (1897–1899)

Speaker of the Texas House of Representatives
- In office January 12, 1897 – January 10, 1899
- Preceded by: Thomas Slater Smith
- Succeeded by: James S. Sherrill

Secretary of State of Texas
- In office January 1907 – February 1908
- Governor: Thomas Mitchell Campbell
- Preceded by: O. K. Shannon
- Succeeded by: William Richardson Davie

Personal details
- Born: Levi Travis Dashiell; April 30, 1869 Chappell Hill, Texas, US
- Died: October 21, 1924 (aged 55)
- Party: Democratic
- Occupation: Politician, lawyer

Levi Travis Dashiell (or Dashiel; April 30, 1869 – October 21, 1924) was an American politician and lawyer. A Democrat, he was Speaker of the Texas House of Representatives and the Secretary of State of Texas.

== Biography ==
Dashiell was born on April 30, 1869, in Chappell Hill, Texas, the son of Benjamin D. Dashiell and Julia A. Dashiell. He attended the University of Texas System between 1886 and 1890. For some months, he worked for the Texas Geological Survey. He read law, and in 1891, he was admitted to the bar at Centerville, after which he began practicing law in Jewett. From January to November 1892, he was the district attorney of Leon County.

Dashiell was a Democrat. He was a member of the Texas House of Representatives, from January 10, 1893, to January 10, 1899. For his first two terms, he represented the 56th district, and for his last term, the Texas's 64th district. He was Speaker of the House from January 12, 1897, to January 10, 1899; He was the first Speaker to be a native of the state. While Speaker, he helped pass laws granting Texas students the first state textbooks.

While in the House, Dashiell was chairman of the Committee on Education, and was a member of the Committees on Constitutional Amendments; on Enrolled Bills; on Impeachment of Land Commissioner; on Judicial Districts; on the Judiciary No. 2; on Penitentiaries; on Roads, Bridges and Ferries; and on State Asylums.

Dashiell was a delegate to the 1896 Democratic National Convention. From January 1907 to February 1908, he was the Secretary of State of Texas, having been appointed by Thomas Mitchell Campbell. In 1908, he was made chairman of the state tax board. He was an unsuccessful candidate to the Railroad Commission of Texas. In 1916, he was on the legal counsel for T. R. Watson, murderer of banker John S. Patterson.

Dashiell died on October 21, 1924, aged 55, from suicide by firearm using a .38 caliber pistol. He was buried at Jewett.
