= Ralph Wallace (Texas politician) =

American legislator

Ralph Ray Wallace III (July 27, 1949 – February 1, 2008) was a Houston, Texas, legislator who represented neighborhoods around Hobby Airport for 15 years in the Texas House of Representatives. Wallace was a lifelong Democrat and he served from 1977 to 1992. After retiring, Wallace held several different jobs including driving a tractor-trailer rig.

Wallace died on February 1, 2008, in Livingston, Texas. His sister, Kathy Wallace Hunt said that he had been in ill health from accidents he suffered while working as a truck driver. She said the cause of his death was unknown.
