= William O. Reed =

American politician and lawyer (1902–1969)

Member of the Texas House of Representatives from the 50th-02 district
- In office January 10, 1933 – January 9, 1951
- Preceded by: Howard Jack Keller
- Succeeded by: Ben Atwell

Speaker of the Texas House of Representatives
- In office January 14, 1947 – January 11, 1949
- Preceded by: Claud H. Gilmer
- Succeeded by: Thomas Durwood Manford Jr.

Personal details
- Born: William Otey Reed; May 12, 1902 Dallas, Texas, US
- Died: October 28, 1969 (aged 67) Dallas, Texas, US
- Party: Democratic
- Occupation: Politician, lawyer

William Otey Reed (May 12, 1902 – October 28, 1969) was an American politician and lawyer. A Democrat, he was a member of the Texas House of Representatives from 1933 to 1951, including a term as Speaker of the House.

== Early life ==
Reed was born on May 12, 1902, in Dallas, the youngest of ten children. His father farmed along the Trinity River and died when Reed was one years old. In his youth, he worked as a newspaper hawker. As a result, he gained street fighting skills, as he had to brawl other hawkers to obtain the best street corners to sell on. Reportedly, his dream was to become a railway engineer. He was educated at local public schools. In 1917, he dropped out of high school.

== Career ==
After dropping out of school, Reed found work at the Houston Water Department. In 1921, he was hired as a clerk by the Texas and Pacific Railway. He read law at night, and in 1930 or 1933, was admitted to the bar, after which he became a lawyer for the railway.

Reed was a Democrat. He was a member of the Texas House of Representatives, from January 10, 1933, to January 9, 1951, representing place number 2 of the 50th district. From January 14, 1947, to January 11, 1949, he was Speaker of the House, with him stepping down to return to being a regular member of the House.

In 1941, he authored the Constitutional amendment which required the government to maintain a balanced budget. He was an unsuccessful candidate in the 1950 Texas lieutenant gubernatorial election. He reportedly defied superstitions, such as by filing for re-election on Friday the 13th and wearing a horseshoe ring with the number 13 on it.

During his tenure, Reed was chairman of the Committees on Appropriations; on Common Carriers; and on the Judiciary. He was a member of the Committees on Banks and Banking; on Congressional and Legislative Districts; on Highways and Motor Traffic; on Municipal and Private Corporations; on Privileges, Suffrage and Elections; and on Rules.

After serving in the House, Reed returned to practicing law. In 1948, he left Texas and Pacific to practice privately, becoming a counsel in Washington, D.C. for the Texas rail industry. He retired in 1967.

== Personal life and death ==
Reed was Presbyterian and a Freemason. An outdoorsman, he enjoyed fishing, golfing, motorboating, and swimming. He died on October 28, 1969, aged 67, in Dallas.
