= 9th Texas Legislature =

The 9th Texas Legislature met from November 4, 1861 to March 7, 1863 in its regular session and one called session. All members of the House of Representatives and about half of the members of the Senate were elected in 1861.

== Sessions ==
- 9th Regular session: November 4, 1861 – January 14, 1862
- 9th First called session: February 2–March 7, 1863

== Officers ==
=== Senate ===
Lieutenant Governor
John McClannahan Crockett
President pro tempore
Robert Henry Guinn, Regular session, First called session

=== House of Representatives ===
Speaker of the House
Constantine W. Buckley, Democrat, November 4, 1861 – December 7, 1861
Nicholas Henry Darnell, Democrat, 7 December 1861–1862
Constantine W. Buckley, Democrat, 1863

== Members ==
Members of the Ninth Texas Legislature at the beginning of the regular session, November 4, 1861

=== Senate ===
District	Senator	Party	Took office
1	Rufus K. Hartley	Democrat	1861
2	Anderson F. Crawford	Democrat	1861
3	M. W. Wheeler	Democrat	1861
4	Lewis F. Casey	Democrat	1861
5	Jesse H. Parsons	Democrat	1861
6	Matthew Fielding Locke	Democrat	1861
7	John W. Moore	Democrat	1861
8	William C. Batte	Democrat	1861
9	Samuel Bell Maxey	Democrat	1861
10	Robert Henry Guinn	Democrat	1861
11	John H. Burnett	Democrat	1861 (First time: 1853–1857)
12	Benjamin T. Selman	Democrat	1861
13	Jefferson Weatherford	Democrat	1861
14	John F. Crawford	Democrat	1863
15	J. J. Dickson	Democrat	1857
16	A. N. Jordan	Democrat	1861
17	Anthony Martin Branch	Democrat	1861
18	John W. Durant	Democrat	1861
19	John Boyd	Democrat	1863
20	Alfred T. Obenchain	Democrat	1863
21	Robert H. Graham	Democrat	1853
22	John T. Harcourt	Democrat	1861
23	Chauncey Berkeley Shepard	Democrat	1861
24	George Preston Finlay	Democrat	1861
25	Stephen Heard Darden	Democrat	1861
26	Nathan George Shelley	Democrat	1861
27	John N. Houston	Democrat	1859
28	George Bernard Erath	Democrat	1863 (First time: 1855–1857)
29	Pryor Lea	Democrat	1861
30	N. A. Mitchell	Democrat	1863
31	Erastus Reed	Democrat	1861
32	Edwin B. Scarborough	Democrat	1853
33	Henry C. Cook	Democrat	1861

=== House of Representatives ===
- George H. Bagby
- Payton Bethell
- Constantine W. Buckley
- Horace Cone
- Nicholas Henry Darnell
- Robert Turner Flewellen
- Sterling Brown Hendricks
- Alfred Marmaduke Hobby
- James K. Holland
- Spearman Holland
- Samuel A. Maverick
- James G. McDonald
- José Ángel Navarro
- John Smith
- James D. Woods
- William Amos Wortham
- Samuel James Polk McDowell

== Membership Changes ==
=== Senate ===
District	Outgoing Senator	Reason for Vacancy	Successor	Date of Successor's Installation
2	Anderson F. Crawford	Crawford resigned before February 2, 1863.	James W. Andres	February 2, 1863
6	Matthew Fielding Locke	Locke resigned before December 16, 1861.	Stephen W. Beasley	December 16, 1861
9	Samuel Bell Maxey	Samuel B. Maxey joined the Confederate States Army and did not return to serve in the legislature.	Rice Maxey	after August 4, 1862
11	John H. Burnett	Burnett resigned before February 2, 1863.	Leroy W. Cooper	February 2, 1863
14	John F. Crawford	Crawford resigned September 21, 1863.	James B. Davis	after October 24, 1863
15	J. J. Dixon	Dixon resigned before February 2, 1863.	William D. Lair	February 2, 1863
17	Anthony Martin Branch	Senator Branch resigned in 1862 to serve in the Confederate States Army.	David Catchings Dickson	February 2, 1863
20	Alfred T. Obenchain	Obenchain resigned February 15, 1862	William Quayle	February 3, 1863
24	George Preston Finlay	Finlay resigned before February 2, 1863.	Samuel Addison White	February 2, 1863
25	Stephen Heard Darden	Darden resigned before February 2, 1863.	Spencer Ford	February 2, 1863
26	Nathan George Shelley	Shelley resigned April 1, 1862.	A. W. Moore	February 2, 1863
28	George Bernard Erath	Erath resigned before February 2, 1863.	George E. Burney	February 2, 1863
32	Edwin B. Scarborough	Scarborough was murdered on October 7, 1862.	Edward R. Hord	February 11, 1863

=== House of Representatives ===
District	Outgoing Representative	Reason for Vacancy	Successor	Date of Successor's Installation
Unknown	Nicholas Henry Darnell	Representative Darnell resigned in 1862 to serve in the Confederate States Army.	Unknown	Unknown
Unknown	Alfred Marmaduke Hobby	Representative Hobby in 1861 to serve in the Confederate States Army.	Unknown	Unknown
Unknown	William Amos Wortham	Representative Wortham resigned in 1861 to serve in the Confederate States Army.	Unknown	Unknown
