= John William Woods =

American politician, farmer and lawyer (1875–1933)

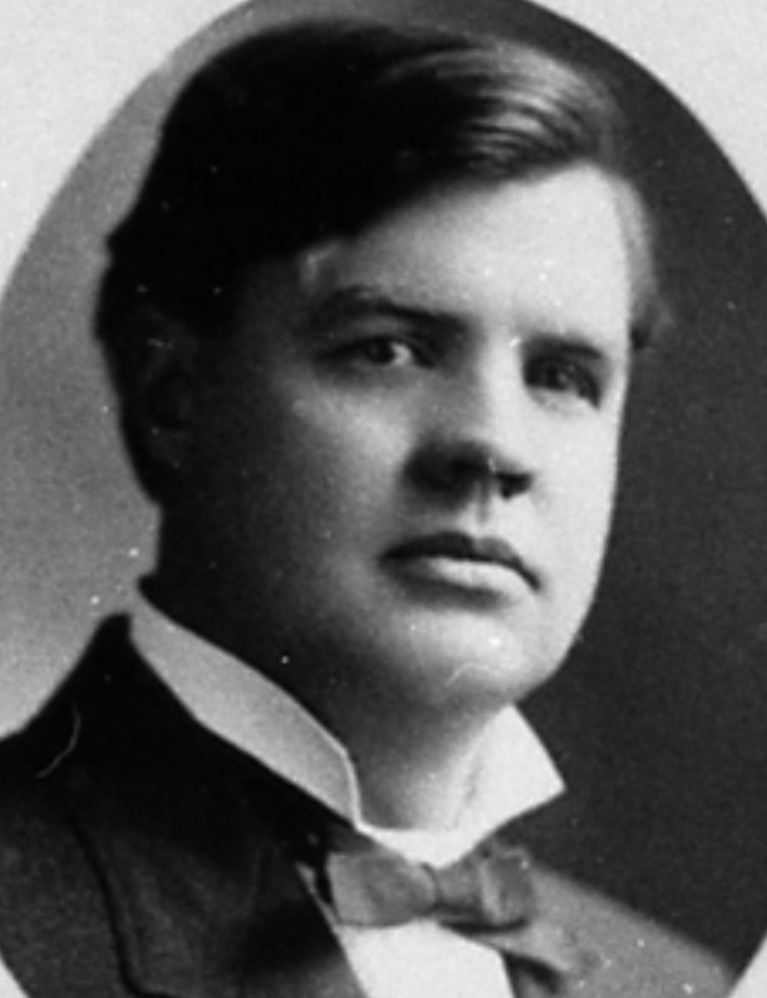
- Woods' portrait for the 33rd Texas Legislature

Member of the Texas House of Representatives from the 121st district
- In office January 14, 1913 – January 9, 1917
- Preceded by: District established
- Succeeded by: Edwin Ray Spencer

Speaker of the Texas House of Representatives
- In office January 12, 1915 – January 9, 1917
- Preceded by: Chester H. Terrell
- Succeeded by: Franklin Oliver Fuller

Personal details
- Born: September 4, 1875 Denton County, Texas, US
- Died: April 18, 1933 (aged 57) Dallas, Texas, US
- Party: Democratic Party
- Occupation: Politician, farmer, lawyer

John William Woods (September 4, 1875 – April 18, 1933) was an American politician, farmer, and lawyer. A Democrat, he was a member of the Texas House of Representatives, including a term as Speaker of the House.

== Early life and education ==
Woods was born on September 4, 1875, in Denton County, Texas, one of at least seven children born to John L. Woods and Amanda (née Forrester) Woods. In 1882, he and his family moved to Callahan County. He helped his family drove a herd of cattle there.

There, Woods lived and worked on a ranch, later on a farm. He worked during the day and attended night school. He began attending school full-time in 1893, in Mineral Wells, after which he became a schoolteacher. In 1897, studied at the University of Texas at Austin School of Law.

== Career ==
From 1898 to 1906, Woods was prosecutor of Callahan County, being elected while still a student at the University of Texas. He moved to Fisher County in 1906, then to Rotan in 1908, becoming its first district attorney in 1909.

Woods was a Democrat. He was a member of the Texas House of Representatives, from January 14, 1913, to January 9, 1917, representing the 121st district. From January 12, 1915, to January 9, 1917, he was Speaker of the House. While Spealer, he was nicknamed the "Cowboy Speaker", due to his agricultural origins.

While serving, Woods was chairman of the Committee on Counties, and was a member of the Committees on Banks and Banking; on Congressional Districts; on Irrigation; on the Judiciary; on Juvenile Reforms; on Public Lands and Land Office; and on Reforms in Criminal Procedure.

Woods' work primarily focused on education and women's rights. He establish a girls' training school in Gainesville, and cowrote a bill to require a minimum of 100 days school attendance for children between ages 8 and 14. He also helped pass the Married Woman's Property Rights Act, and a law granting women a 54-hour workweek.

In 1913, Woods was gubernatorially appointed to the Southern Conference on Women and Child Labor. He unsuccessfully ran for Texas Attorney General in 1916 and 1918.

== Personal life and death ==
On December 26, 1900, Woods married Helen Smith, with whom he had a daughter. He was a member of the Methodist Episcopal Church, South, as well as a member of the Knights Templar, the Order of the Eastern Star, and the Scottish Rite. In his later years, he lived in Abilene, Baird, and Dallas, in that order. He died in the lattermost city, on April 18, 1933, aged 57, following two years of illness.
