= Constantine W. Buckley =

American politician

Speaker of the Texas House of Representatives
- In office February 2, 1863 – November 2, 1863
- Preceded by: Nicholas Henry Darnell
- Succeeded by: M. D. K. Taylor

Member of the Texas House of Representatives from the 47th district
- In office November 4, 1861 - December 19, 1865
- Preceded by: Elijah James Chance
- Succeeded by: Titus Howard Mundine

Member of the Texas House of Representatives from the 51st district
- In office November 2, 1857 - November 4, 1861
- Preceded by: James S. Sullivan
- Succeeded by: Albert H. Rippetoe

Personal details
- Born: January 22, 1815 Surry County, North Carolina
- Died: December 19, 1865 (aged 50) Columbia, Texas
- Children: 3

Constantine W. Buckley (January 22, 1815 – December 19, 1865) was an American politician in Texas who served two non-consecutive terms as Speaker of the Texas House of Representatives between 1861 and 1863.

Buckley was born January 22, 1815, in Surry County, North Carolina, but had moved to Georgia by 1828 where he began working as a store clerk. In 1834 in Columbus, Buckley opened a store of his own, which closed after the Panic of 1837. After losing everything, he moved to Houston in the Republic of Texas, where he was a clerk in the State Department. While Buckley worked there, he was tutored in law by Attorney General John Birdsall, which enabled Buckley's admission to the bar in November 1839.

Gov. James Pinckney Henderson appointed him a District Judge in 1847, but Buckley resigned in 1854 in order to resume private practice. Buckley was first elected to the Texas House of Representatives from Richmond in 1857. He represented Austin and Fort Bend counties in the Seventh, Eighth, and Ninth Legislatures. On November 4, 1861, at the beginning of the Regular Session of the Ninth Legislature, Buckley was elected Speaker and served until he apparently resigned on December 7, 1861. After Buckley's successor, Nicholas Henry Darnell resigned sometime in 1862, Buckley was elected to the vacant office of Speaker for the First Called Session that convened on February 2, 1863, defeating Reps. Robert Turner Flewellen and John Smith, 54 votes to 5 and 1, respectively.

Buckley was married twice, the first time in 1840. He had three children with his first wife who had apparently died by 1852 when Buckley then married Mrs. Ann R. Nibbs. Buckley drowned in the Brazos River near Columbia, Texas, on December 19, 1865.

== Notes ==
Preceded by Unknown	Member of the Texas House of Representatives; 1855–22 July 1858	Succeeded by Unknown
Preceded by M. D. K. Taylor	Speaker of the Texas House of Representatives; 4 November 1861–7 December 1861	Succeeded by Nicholas Henry Darnell
Preceded by Vacant^{1}	Speaker of the Texas House of Representatives; 2 February 1863^{2}–2 November 1863	Succeeded by M. D. K. Taylor
Notes and references
1. Nicholas Henry Darnell resigned some time in 1862, and the office of Speaker was apparently vacant until the beginning of the First Called Session of the Ninth Texas Legislature (records are incomplete); 2. Buckley was most likely elected at the beginning of the First Called Session on 2 February 1863
