= James Callan Graham =

American attorney, aviator and politician

James Callan Graham (October 2, 1914 – July 23, 2006), generally referred to as Callan Graham, was an attorney in the Texas Hill Country, a pilot in World War II and a member of the Texas House of Representatives.

== Biography ==
=== Early life and education ===
Born in Del Rio, Texas, on October 2, 1914, to John Coburn Graham and Margaret Callan Graham. His earliest years where spent in Del Rio. He also lived in Mexico, where his father ranched sheep, becoming fluent in Spanish at a very early age. This fluency served him well throughout his life. In 1923 he moved with his family to a Kimble County ranch. Graham graduated from Junction High School and attended the University of Texas at Austin for a short time.

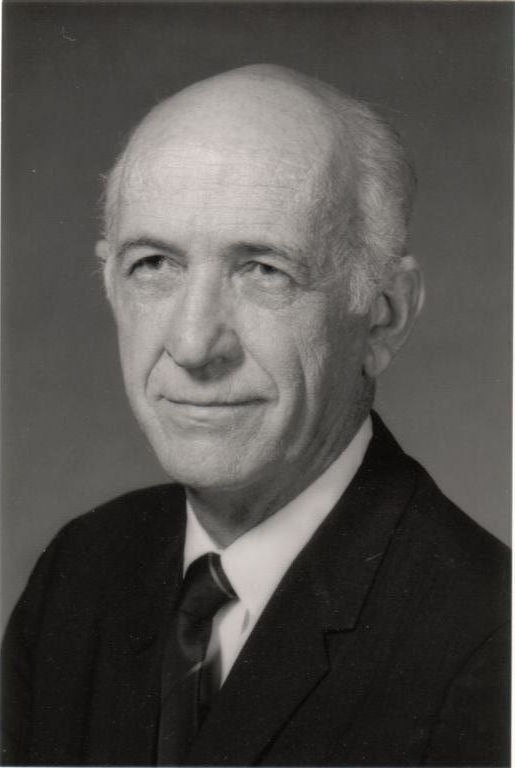
James Callan Graham, circa 1999

=== Career ===
Coke Stevenson who was then the Speaker of the Texas House of Representatives took an interest in Callan, loaned him books and the use of an office and moral support and in February 1935, Callan passed the State Bar Examination and opened a law practice in Junction, Texas. This began what was to be a lifelong career in public service. During the next few years, as Graham built his law practice, he began pursuing the hobby of flying. As a boy in Del Rio in the early 1920s, he had earned his first plane ride from a barnstormer by sweeping out hangars. After obtaining his pilot's license he bought his first plane, a canvas-covered Taylorcraft, and was the first person to land a private plane on a dirt strip now known as Kimble County's "Callan Graham Field." His father, then Kimble County Sheriff, didn't think too highly of his son's hobby, remarking that he should spend more time on the ground, tending to business. In 1936, at the age of 22, Graham was appointed County Attorney for Kimble County and was later appointed District Attorney for the 112th Judicial District.

When World War II broke out, Graham used his hobby to serve his country. Initially he served as a civilian flying instructor in Uvalde, teaching raw recruits the basics of flying and preparing them for the extreme pressures of combat. Eventually Callan was commissioned a 2nd Lieutenant in the Army Air Corps. He was assigned to the Air Transport Command and was first stationed in Dallas, ferrying planes to and from points across the United States. He later flew across the Atlantic Ocean and Africa to a duty station in India, leaving his wife at home, pregnant with their first child. He flew The Hump across the Himalayan mountains between India and Burma, delivering planes, troops and cargo in support of the effort to defeat the Japanese.

After completing his military obligation, Graham returned home in 1945 to resume his law practice. During this time he also wrote and obtained the charter for the First State Bank of Junction, which was granted on November 8, 1947. In 1948, Callan ran for and won election to the House of Representatives of the Texas Legislature, representing a ten county district around Kimble County. He served two terms, and while in the legislature he became known as a "bill killer," espousing the view that less government was a good thing. During the infamous primary race for the U.S. Senate between Gov. Coke Stevenson and Lyndon Johnson, Graham was sent, along with two other young attorneys, to the Rio Grande Valley by his friend Coke Stevenson to investigate allegations of voter fraud and ballot box tampering. Graham discovered a number of irregularities; however, not enough proof was gained in the short time required to contest the primary results, and LBJ went on to win the seat in the general election. Graham always believed that Gov. Stevenson should have won the election, but he also was adamant that LBJ had no direct knowledge of any wrongdoing.

Among Mr. Graham's accomplishments during his time in the legislature, perhaps the one that most affected the people of Kimble County was the passage of a bill establishing the Texas A&M University Center at Junction in March 1949 (Now the Texas Tech University Center at Junction). Another legislative action taken by Graham that directly affected the people of Kimble County was preventing the closure of the Kerrville State Hospital, a facility that has served not only this community, but many others as well. While in the legislature, Graham also drafted and sponsored an anti-abortion bill. Later, as an influential lobbyist he wrote and helped pass the first minimum wage law in Texas.

On November 2, 1950, Graham and a partner were granted a permit to operate Junction's first radio station, thus KMBL Radio was born on Flat Rock Lane near the South Llano River. Following his two terms in the Texas House, Callan and Maude moved their family to San Antonio, where he took a position with a law firm. In 1954, he accepted the position of general counsel for the Texas Manufacturers' Association, an organization designed to promote productivity and business. This began a long career as a lobbyist in Texas politics. In 1956, the Graham family moved to Austin, where Callan took the position of executive director of the Texas Good Roads Association, lobbying for highway improvement and construction.

In 1963, Callan resigned his position with the TGRA and accepted an offer from the Catholic Bishops of Texas to organize and head up the Texas Catholic Conference. This organization was established to foster cooperation between and to coordinate the efforts of the separate Catholic dioceses of Texas. The importance that Callan placed on this position is underscored by the fact that he took a substantial cut in salary when he accepted the job. Ten years later, Callan "retired" to the family ranch in 1973, to raise a few cattle and renew old friendships. In recognition of his faithful service to the church, Callan was made a Knight in the Order of the Holy Sepulchre.

Duty called again however, and in 1986 Callan was asked to fill an unexpired term as Kimble County Attorney, the office that he was first appointed to fifty years earlier. He was re-elected twice more, and retired for good in 1998. In 1996 the people of Kimble County honored him with the Lifetime Achievement Award. Callan was also a past president and longtime member of the Junction Rotary Club, and was honored with the club's Paul Harris Fellowship in 2005.

=== Marriage and children ===
Callan married his high school sweetheart, Maude Rowena Boone, in the old Sacred Heart Catholic Church in Menard, Texas on July 31, 1935, the same church and date as Callan's parents were married in 1913. This was the first Catholic Church in what is now the Diocese of San Angelo, and the land for the church was donated by Callan's grandfather, J.J. Callan, a founding pioneer of both Coleman and Menard counties. In all Callan and Maude had five children, Michael Callan in 1944, John Stephen in 1946, James Timothy in 1948, Margaret Mary in 1954 and Patrick Boone in 1958.

=== Death and afterward ===
James Callan Graham died on July 23, 2006, in his home in Junction, Texas. He was attended by his family. Graham was preceded in death one year earlier by his wife of 70 years. He was survived by his five children, ten grandchildren and eleven great-grandchildren.
