= Robert E. Prince =

American politician and lawyer (1859–1925)

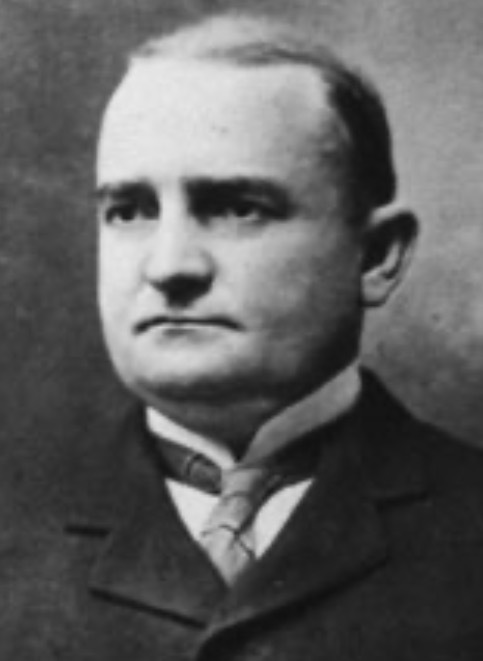
- Prince's portrait for the 27th Texas Legislature

Member of the Texas House of Representatives from the 58th district
- In office January 10, 1899 – January 13, 1903
- Preceded by: Andrew F. Wood
- Succeeded by: John Rudolph Kubena

Speaker of the Texas House of Representatives
- In office January 8, 1901 – January 13, 1903
- Preceded by: James S. Sherrill
- Succeeded by: Pat Morris Neff

Personal details
- Born: Robert Emmett Prince; October 1, 1859 Coahoma County, Mississippi, US
- Died: March 25, 1925 (aged 65) Navarro County, Texas, US
- Party: Democratic
- Occupation: Politician, lawyer

Robert Emmett Prince (October 1, 1859 – March 23, 1925) was an American politician and lawyer. A Democrat, he was a member of the Texas House of Representatives, including a term as Speaker.

== Early life and education ==
Prince was born on October 1, 1859, in Coahoma County, Mississippi, the son of Joseph P. Prince and Sally Clara (née Davis) Prince. He grew up in Memphis, Tennessee, where he worked as a grocer.

At age 14, Prince began attending a military school. Prince later studied at the Cumberland School of Law and the University of Tennessee; he attended from the latter from 1873 to 1878, earning a Bachelor of Philosophy. He was admitted to the bar, and in 1882, moved to Corsicana, Texas.

== Career ==
In Corsicana, Prince partnered with John J. McClellan. Later, he formed a partnership with Cornelius W. Taylor, previously assistant to the Texas Attorney General. He was a member of the Texas Militia, ranked lieutenant colonel, as well as assistant to the Adjutant General of Texas.

Prince was a Democrat. He was a delegate to the 1892 Democratic National Convention. He was a member of the Texas House of Representatives, from January 10, 1899, to January 13, 1903, representing the 58th district. From January 8, 1901, he was Speaker of the House, being unanimously elected to the office. He left the House to unsuccessfully enter the 1902 United States House of Representatives election in Texas, running for Texas's 6th district.

While serving, Prince was a member of the Committees on Claims and Accounts; on Commerce and Manufactures; on Constitutional Amendments; on Internal Improvements; on the Judiciary; on Revenue and Taxation; on State Asylums; and on Towns and City Corporations. He penned the state's first oil and gas industry regulations. Under his speakership, a law was passed a law granting lower taxes to Galveston in order to recover from the 1900 Galveston hurricane, as well as the Terrell Election Law.

After serving in he Legislature, Prince returned to practicing law. He represented the Texas Electric Railway and the Trinity and Brazos Valley Railway in court. For a time, he was president of Corsicana's City National Bank; President of the Texas Loan Agency; a member of the Texas State Board of Education; and a trustee of the Corsicana Residential Treatment Center.

== Personal life and death ==
On December 23, 1885, Prince married Fannie M. Salmon. She died in 1886, and in 1893, he married Maggie Talley, with whom he had two children. He was Presbyterian and a member of the Freemasons. He died on March 23, 1925, aged 65, from heart failure, in Navarro County, Texas, and was buried at Oakwood Cemetery, in Corsicana.
