= Thomas Durwood Manford Jr. =

American attorney and Texas legislator

Speaker of the Texas House of Representatives
- In office January 11, 1949 – January 9, 1951
- Preceded by: William O. Reed
- Succeeded by: Reuben E. Senterfitt

Personal details
- Born: Thomas Durwood Manford Jr. Smiley, Texas, U.S.
- Died: March 24, 1988 (aged 71)
- Party: Conservative Democrat

Thomas Durwood Manford Jr. (1917 - 1988) was an American lawyer and politician from the State of Texas. He served as the Speaker of the Texas House of Representatives for the 51st Texas Legislature.

== Early life and education ==
Thomas Durwood Manford Jr. was born on March 13, 1917 in Smiley, Texas. He attended Southwestern University and the University of Texas. He earned a Bachelor of Arts degree and also studied law.

== Career ==
Manford was an attorney by trade after learning the profession in a law office. Manford was first elected to the Texas House of Representatives in 1940, running as a Conservative Democrat. He served five consecutive terms and was the author of the Manford Act of 1943. Manford also established the Legislative Budget Board and the Legislative Council and served as the Speaker of the House in 1949.

After his work in the legislature, Manford became a rancher and helped with his family's retail business. He also served on numerous boards, including the Texas Board of State Hospitals and Special Schools and the Texas Insurance Board.

== Personal life ==
Manford died on March 24, 1988.
