= George Bernard Erath =

Austrian-American politician

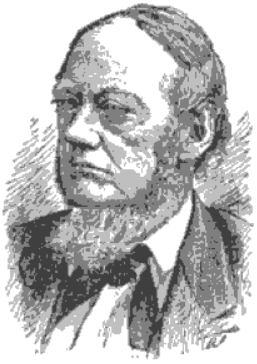

Member of the Texas Senate
- In office 1848–1852
- In office 1862–1866
- In office 1874–1878

Member of the Texas House of Representatives
- In office 1844–1846

Personal details
- Born: January 1, 1813 Vienna, Austrian Empire
- Died: May 13, 1891 (aged 78) Waco, Texas
- Spouse: Lucinda Chalmers (m. 1845)
- Children: 5
- Occupation: Surveyor, politician

George Bernard Erath (January 1, 1813 – May 13, 1891) served in both the Texas House of Representatives and Texas Senate.

== Biography ==
Born in Vienna, Austria, he was a Texas pioneer and soldier who fought in the Texas Revolution, subsequently supporting the Republic's annexation to the United States.

As a surveyor, he drew up the original street grids for the Texas cities of Waco, Caldwell, and Stephenville. He was a charter member of historic Waco Masonic Lodge #92.

He married Lucinda Chalmers in December 1845, and they had five children.

He was elected to the Texas House of Representatives in 1844 and 1846, and to the Texas Senate in 1848, 1861, and 1873.

He died in Waco on May 13, 1891.

Erath County, Texas, is named for him.
