= Austin Milton Kennedy =

American lawmaker from Texas

Speaker of the Texas House of Representatives
- Preceded by: Thomas Bell Love
- Succeeded by: John Wesley Marshall

Personal details
- Born: Austin Milton Kennedy; July 16, 1866 Alabama, U.S.
- Died: July 19, 1914 (aged 48) Kerrville, Texas, U.S.
- Party: Democratic

Austin Milton Kennedy (1866 - 1914) was an American lawmaker who served as the Speaker of the Texas House of Representatives during the 31st Texas Legislature.

== Early life and education ==
Kennedy was born in Alabama on July 16, 1866. He moved to Texas with his parents in 1870, settling in Limestone County. He had little formal education but contributed to articles in local newspapers and apprenticed as a printer in his younger years.

== Career ==
Kennedy began a career in journalism in 1887 when he founded the Mexia Domocrat. He was editor of the paper for five years before purchasing an interest in the Waco Daily Day. He managed the Waco Daily Day only briefly, running into financial and political troubles for supporting Jim Hogg as governor over a local Waco opponent in the 1892 primary election.

Kennedy was appointed secretary of the Texas Senate for both the 22nd and 23rd Texas Legislatures. He ran for state legislature in 1894 but lost to a Populist candidate. He subsequently was elected to the state legislature in 1898 where he served a total of seven terms.

Kennedy was elected Speaker of the Texas House of Representatives during the 31st Texas Legislature. He resigned his position as Speaker in 1909 after a resolution accusing him of improper spending, but maintained his seat in the House until he died in 1914.

== Personal life ==
Kennedy died on July 19, 1914 in Kerrville, Texas.
