= Robert Emmett Morse =

American politician and lawyer (1896–1957)

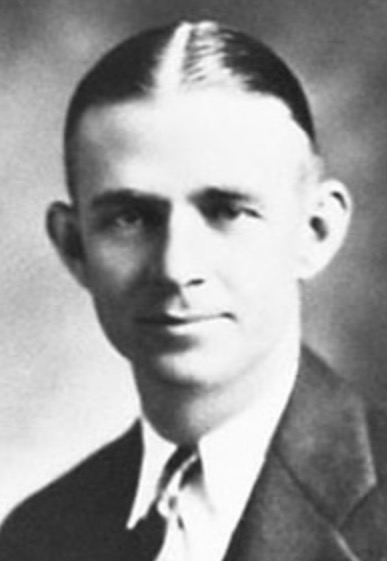
- Morse's portrait for the 40th Texas Legislature

Member of the Texas House of Representatives from the 19th-04 district
- In office January 11, 1927 – January 9, 1945
- Preceded by: Multi-member district
- Succeeded by: Multi-member district

Speaker of the Texas House of Representatives
- In office January 10, 1939 – January 14, 1941
- Preceded by: Robert W. Calvert
- Succeeded by: Homer Lakerby Leonard

Personal details
- Born: April 8, 1896 Houston, Texas, US
- Died: August 19, 1957 (aged 61) Austin, Texas, US
- Party: Democratic
- Occupation: Politician, lawyer

Robert Emmett Morse (April 8, 1896 – August 19, 1957) was an American politician and lawyer. A Democrat, he was a member of the Texas House of Representatives, including a term as Speaker of the House.

== Early life and military service ==
Morse was born on April 8, 1896, in Houston, the son of Henry D. Morse and Willie Eleanor (née Henson) Morse. Educated at public schools, he studied at the Somerville Law School. He fought in World War I, for two years serving as a first lieutenant in the Infantry Branch of the United States Army. He had trained at the First Officers Training Camp, in Leon Springs.

== Career ==
Following the war, Morse returned to Houston, where he worked as a real estate developer. From 1919 to 1923, he was the first secretary of the Houston Real Estate Board, and from 1923 to 1926, was secretary of the Texas Association of Real Estate Boards.

Morse was a Democrat. He was a member of the Texas House of Representatives, from January 11, 1927, to January 9, 1945, representing place number 4 of the 19th district. He was Speaker of the House, from January 10, 1939, to January 14, 1941. He was nominated for speakership by Howard Gallemore Hartzog, George H. Little, and Houston McMurry, and was unanimously elected to the office.

While serving, Morse was chairman of the Committees on Commerce and Manufactures; on Enrolled Bills; on and State Affairs, as well as a member of the Committees on Banks and Banking; on Conservation and Reclamation; on Constitutional Amendments; on Examination of Comptroller's and Treasurer's Accounts; Highways and Motor Traffic; on Military Affairs; on Municipal and Private Corporations; on Public Lands and Buildings; on Oil, Gas and Mining; and on Rules. Under his speakership, Big Bend National Park was established.

Morris read law during his House tenure, and in 1939, was admitted to the bar, with him beginning his practice in Austin following his tenure. He was a member of the general counsel of the Wholesale Liquor Dealers Association.

== Personal life and death ==
By 1920, Morse married Eugenia Maddox, with whom he had three children. They later divorced, with him remarrying to Arline Morse. In the early 1940s, he moved to Austin. He was Baptist, as well as a member of the American Legion, the Shriners, and the YMCA.

On January 28, 1956, Morse suffered a myocardial infraction, which worsened his health for the remainder of his life. He died on August 19, 1957, aged 61, in Austin, from a stroke, and was buried at Austin Memorial Park.
