= Speeches by spouses of nominees at United States presidential nominating conventions =

Since 1992, speeches by spouses of presidential nominees have become a standard feature of major party United States presidential nominating conventions, and speeches by spouses of vice presidential nominees have also become a somewhat frequent feature as well.

There were several earlier instances where the wives of presidential nominees spoke at conventions, though it would not become a standard feature of convention's until after Barbara Bush's speech at the 1992 Republican convention. Eleanor Roosevelt was the first candidate's spouse to address a nominating convention, doing so at the 1940 Democratic convention. In her speech, Roosevelt highlighted the extraordinary stakes that should warrant her husband being granted a third term. It would not be until 1972 Republican convention that a second candidate's wife would deliver a speech to a convention, with Pat Nixon delivering brief welcoming remarks at that convention. Barbara Bush's remarks at the 1992 RNC, however, set a standard followed at subsequent conventions of the nominee's spouse delivering a lengthier speech that paints a humanizing portrait of nominee as a private individual. During the following election in 1996, both parties had the spouses of their presidential nominee address their conventions. Speeches by the spouse of party presidential nominees thereafter became a standard and expected aspect of major party presidential conventions. It would not be until the 2024 Republican convention that major party presidential nominee's spouse would again receive abstain from delivering such a speech at their respective nominating convention.

== Early instances ==
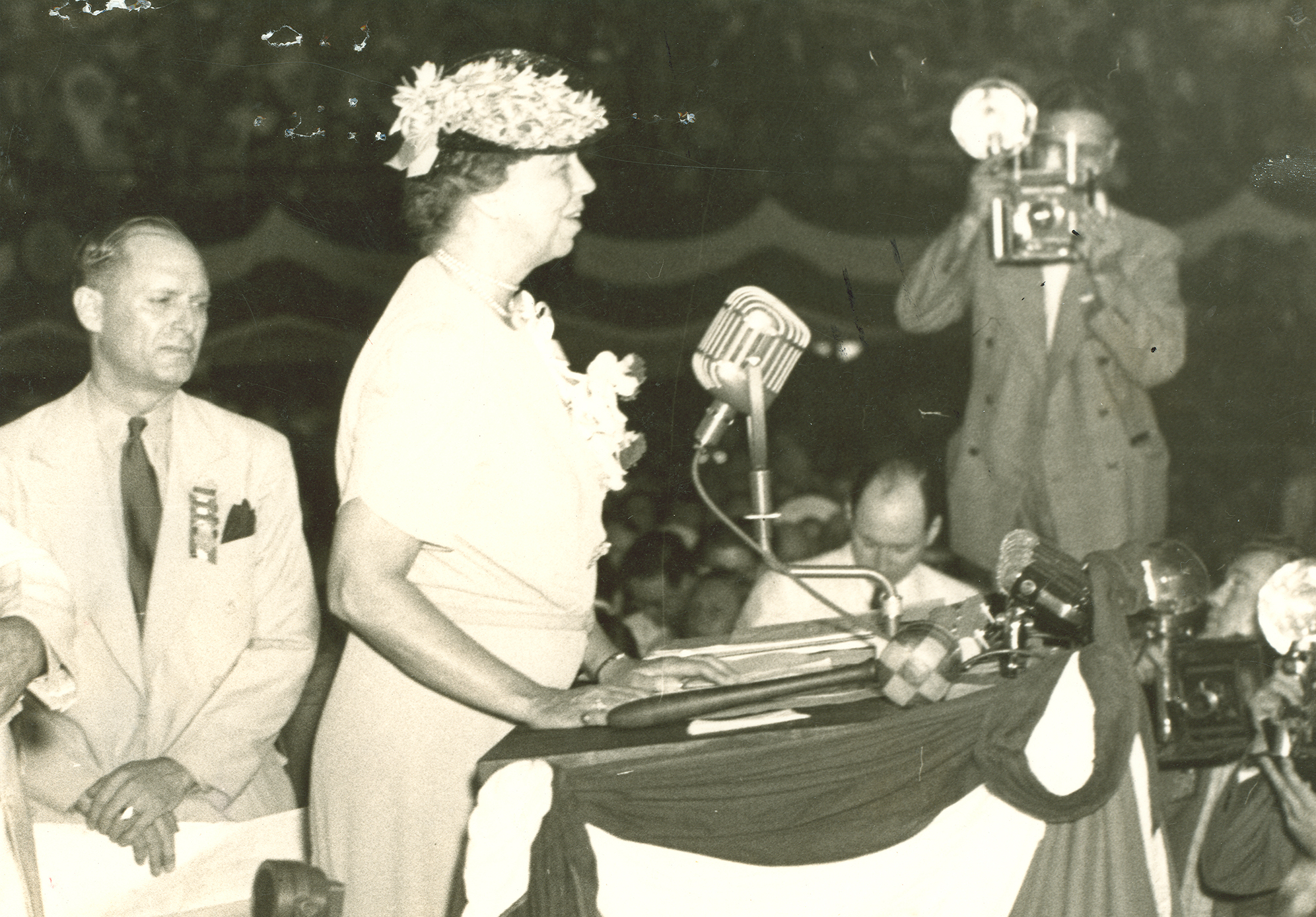
Eleanor Roosevelt delivering her speech at the 1940 Democratic National Convention

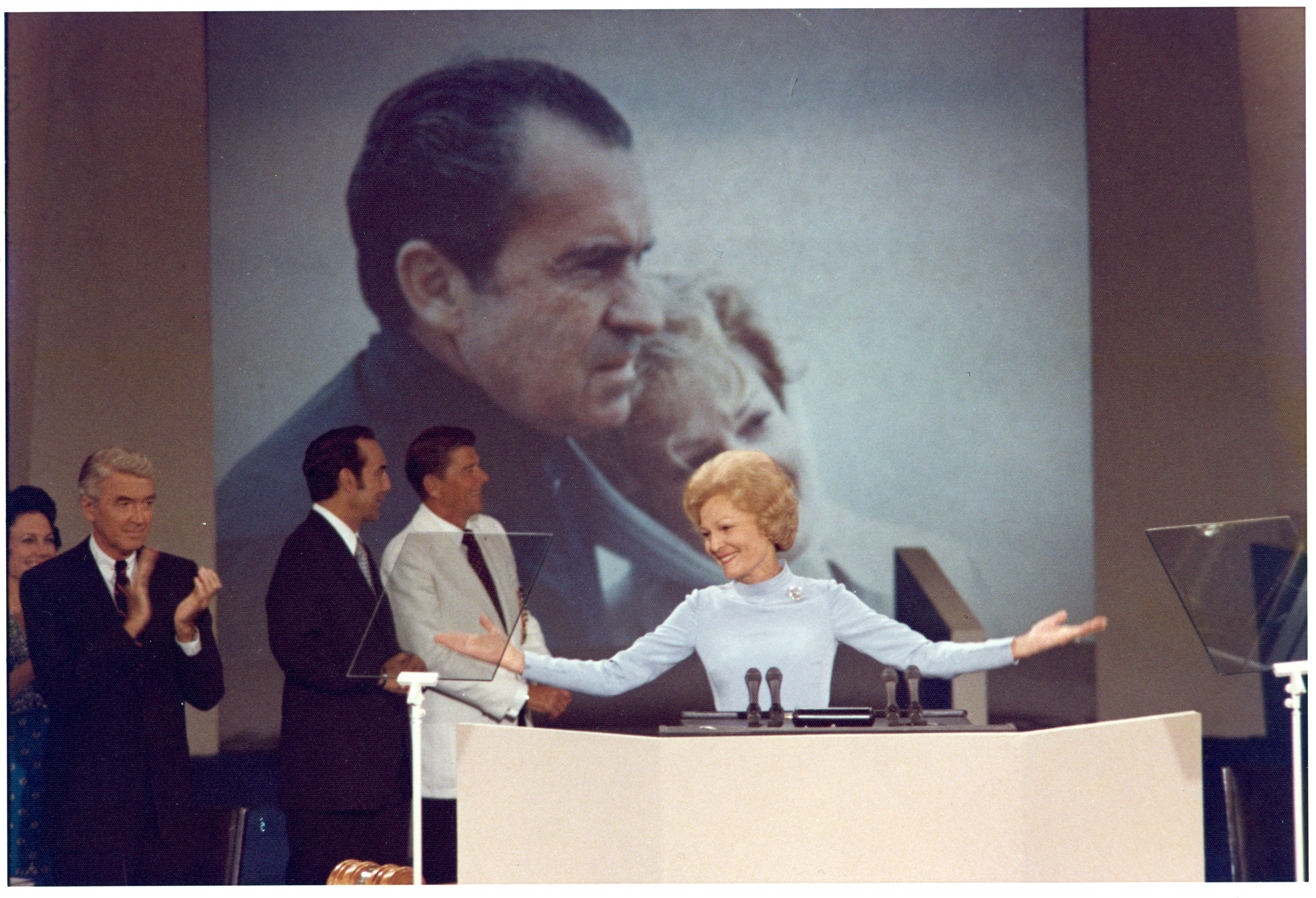
Pat Nixon speaking at the 1972 Republican National Convention

Convention speeches by the spouses of nominees are a relatively young tradition in American politics. Before 1996, speeches by nominee's spouses were not a regular component of presidential nominating conventions.

1940 marked the first instance in which a major party nominee's spouse spoke before a convention. After Franklin Delano Roosevelt secured nomination for an unprecedented third term, many delegates grew discordant in their disapproval at the prospect of nominating Henry A. Wallace to be his running mate. Roosevelt sent his politically-active wife, First Lady Eleanor Roosevelt, to the 1940 Democratic National Convention to deliver a speech in which she argued that extraordinary times required unity. This was an argument intended to bolster sentiments support of her husband's efforts to win a third term in the general election and persuade delegates to promptly unify behind a ticket that included Wallace.

The next nominee's spouse to speak before a convention was First Lady Pat Nixon, who delivered brief welcoming remarks at the 1972 Republican National Convention. Her remarks focused primarily on thanking those at the convention for supporting her husband's candidacy. Up through 1988, the subsequent instances in which nominee's spouses spoke at convention were of a similar nature to Nixon's. At the 1976 Republican National Convention, Betty Ford delivered brief informal remarks "accepting" an honorary personal nomination for first lady which actor Cary Grant offered her. At the 1988 Republican National Convention, Barbara Bush (wife of presidential nominee George H. W. Bush) delivered brief remarks in which she pledged her authenticity as a non-politician, declaring, "What you see with me is what you get. I'm not running for president ––George Bush is."

There had also been at least some occasion of a third party nominee's spouse addressing their nominating conventions. One such instance occurred at the 1952 Progressive National Convention, where Vivian Hallinan read a presidential nomination acceptance speech on behalf of her husband, Vincent Hallinan, who was serving a prison sentence at the time of the convention.

== Modern tradition (1990s–present) ==
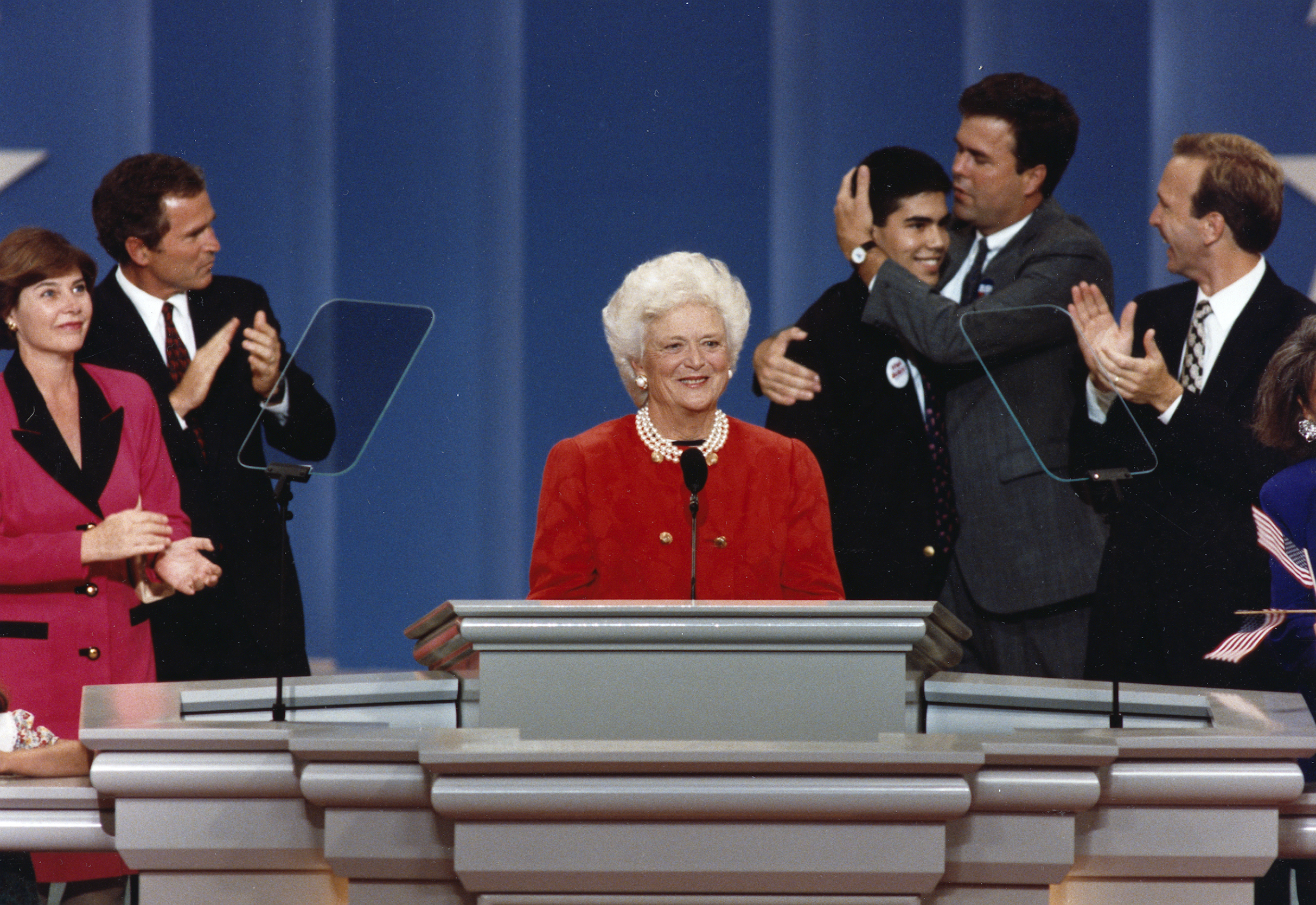
Barbara Bush speaking at the 1992 Republican National Convention

At the 1992 Republican National Convention, First Lady Barbara Bush delivered a speech that ushered in the modern mold for speeches by spouses of nominees. Her speech was centered upon anecdotes that painted a more humanizing image of her husband. The next presidential election, 1996, was the first in which the wives of both major party's presidential nominees spoke at their respective conventions. Speeches both by Elizabeth Dole at the 1996 Republican National Convention and Hillary Clinton at the 1996 Democratic National Convention established a modern convention of the spouses of both presidential nominees spouse speaking at their respective convention, which afterwards became a standard and expected feature of nominating conventions.

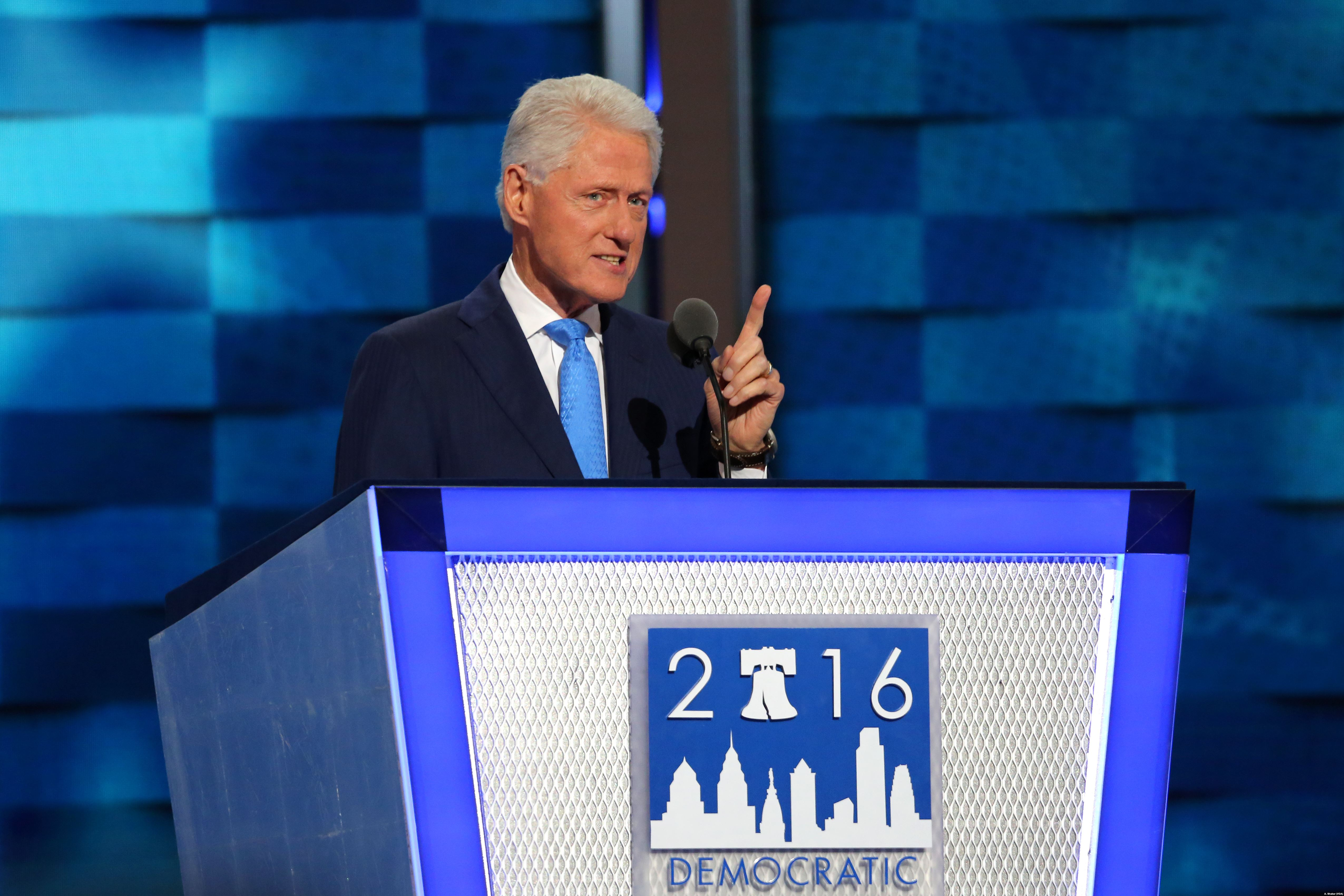
Bill Clinton speaking at the 2016 Democratic National Convention

In 2016, Bill Clinton (himself a former president) became the first male spouse of a nominee to deliver a convention speech.

At the 2024 Republican National Convention, Melania Trump (who had been mostly absent from the campaign trail) abstained from the modern tradition of presidential nominees' spouses addressing convention. She was the first spouse of a presidential nominee to abstain from speaking at a convention since Hillary Clinton did not speak at the 1992 Democratic National Convention.

== Summary table (by year) ==
Summary table (by year)
Election	Democratic Convention		Republican Convention		Notes
Election	Speech by presidential nominee's spouse	Speech by VP nominee's spouse	Speech by presidential nominee's spouse	Speech by VP nominee's spouse	Notes
before 1940	No speeches by spouses of nominees				
1940	Yes (Eleanor Roosevelt) (details)	No (Ilo Wallace)	No (Edith Wilkie)	No (Cornelia McNary)	Roosevelt (who spoke) was the incumbent first lady
1944–1968	No speeches by spouses of nominees				
1972	No (Eleanor McGovern	No (Barbara Eagleton)	Yes (Pat Nixon)	No (Judy Agnew)	Nixon (who spoke) was the incumbent first lady; Agnew (who did not speak) was the incumbent second lady
1976	No (Rosalynn Carter)	No (Joan Mondale)	Yes (Betty Ford)	No (Elizabeth Dole)	Ford (who spoke) was the incumbent first lady
1980	No (Rosalynn Carter)	No (Joan Mondale)	No (Nancy Reagan)	No (Barbara Bush)	Carter and Mondale (neither of whom spoke) were the incumbent first and second ladies
1984	No (Joan Mondale)	No (John Zaccaro)	Yes (Nancy Reagan)	No (Barbara Bush)	Zaccaro (who did not speak) was the first male spouse of a major party nominee, his wife (Democratic vice presidential nominee Geraldine Ferraro) was the first woman nominated on a major party presidential ticket; Reagan (who spoke) and Bush (who did not speak) were the incumbent first and second ladies
1988	No (Kitty Dukakis)	No (B.A. Bentsen)	Yes (Barbara Bush)	No (Marilyn Quayle)	Bush (who spoke) was also the incumbent second lady
1992	No (Hillary Clinton)	No (Tipper Gore)	Yes (Barbara Bush)	Yes (Marilyn Quayle)	Bush and Quayle (both of whom spoke) were the incumbent first and second ladies
1996	Yes (Hillary Clinton)	Yes (Tipper Gore)	Yes (Elizabeth Dole)	No (Joanne Kemp)	first year in which the spouse of both major party presidential nominees spoke; Clinton and Gore (both of whom spoke) were the incumbent first and second ladies
2000	Yes (Tipper Gore)	Yes (Hadassah Lieberman)	Yes (Laura Bush)	Yes (Lynne Cheney)	Gore (who spoke) was also the incumbent second lady
2004	Yes (Teresa Heinz)	Yes (Elizabeth Edwards)	Yes (Laura Bush)	No (Lynne Cheney)	Bush (who spoke) was the incumbent first lady; Cheney (who did not speak) was the incumbent second lady
2008	Yes (Michelle Obama)	No (Jill Biden)	Yes (Cindy McCain)	No (Todd Palin)	Todd Palin (who did not speak) was the first male spouse of a Republican nominee, his wife (Republican vice presidential nominee Sarah Palin) being the first female nominee on a Republican presidential ticket
2012	Yes (Michelle Obama)	Yes (Jill Biden)	Yes (Ann Romney)	No (Janna Ryan)	Obama and Biden (both of whom spoke) were the incumbent first and second ladies
2016	Yes (Bill Clinton)	No (Anne Holton)	Yes (Melania Trump)	No (Karen Pence)	Clinton (who spoke, and was a former president) was the first nominee's spouse who had previously been a nominee themselves, as well as the first male spouse of a major party presidential nominee (his wife, Hillary, was the first female major party presidential nominee)
2020	Yes (Jill Biden)	No (Doug Emhoff)	Yes (Melania Trump) (details)	Yes (Karen Pence)	Trump and Pence (both of whom spoke) were the incumbent first and second ladies
2024	Yes (Doug Emhoff)	No (Gwen Walz)	No (Melania Trump)	Yes (Usha Vance)	Emhoff (who spoke) was also the incumbent second gentleman

== Analysis of modern speeches ==
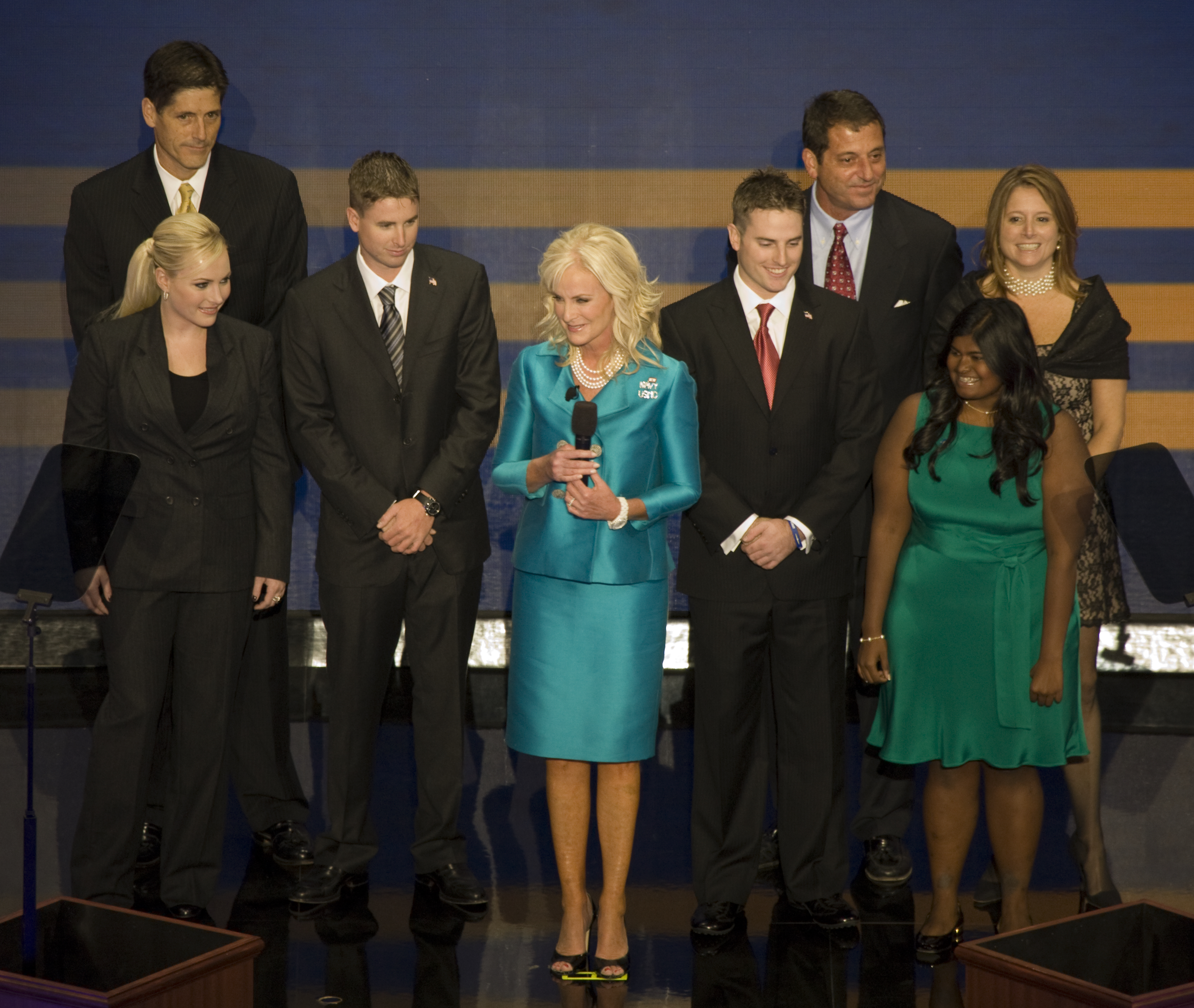
Cindy McCain speaking at the 2008 Republican National Convention

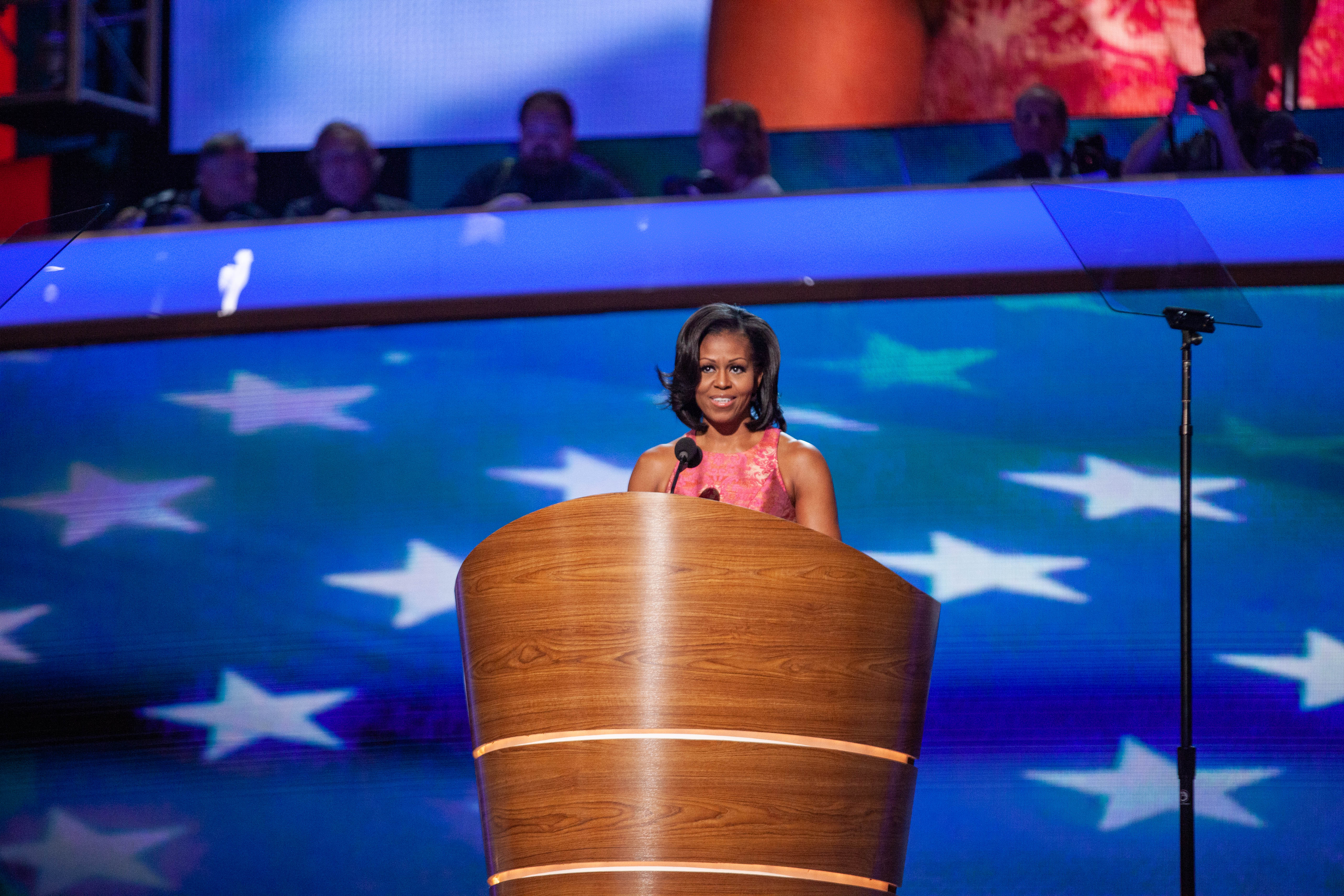
Michelle Obama speaking at the 2012 Democratic National Convention

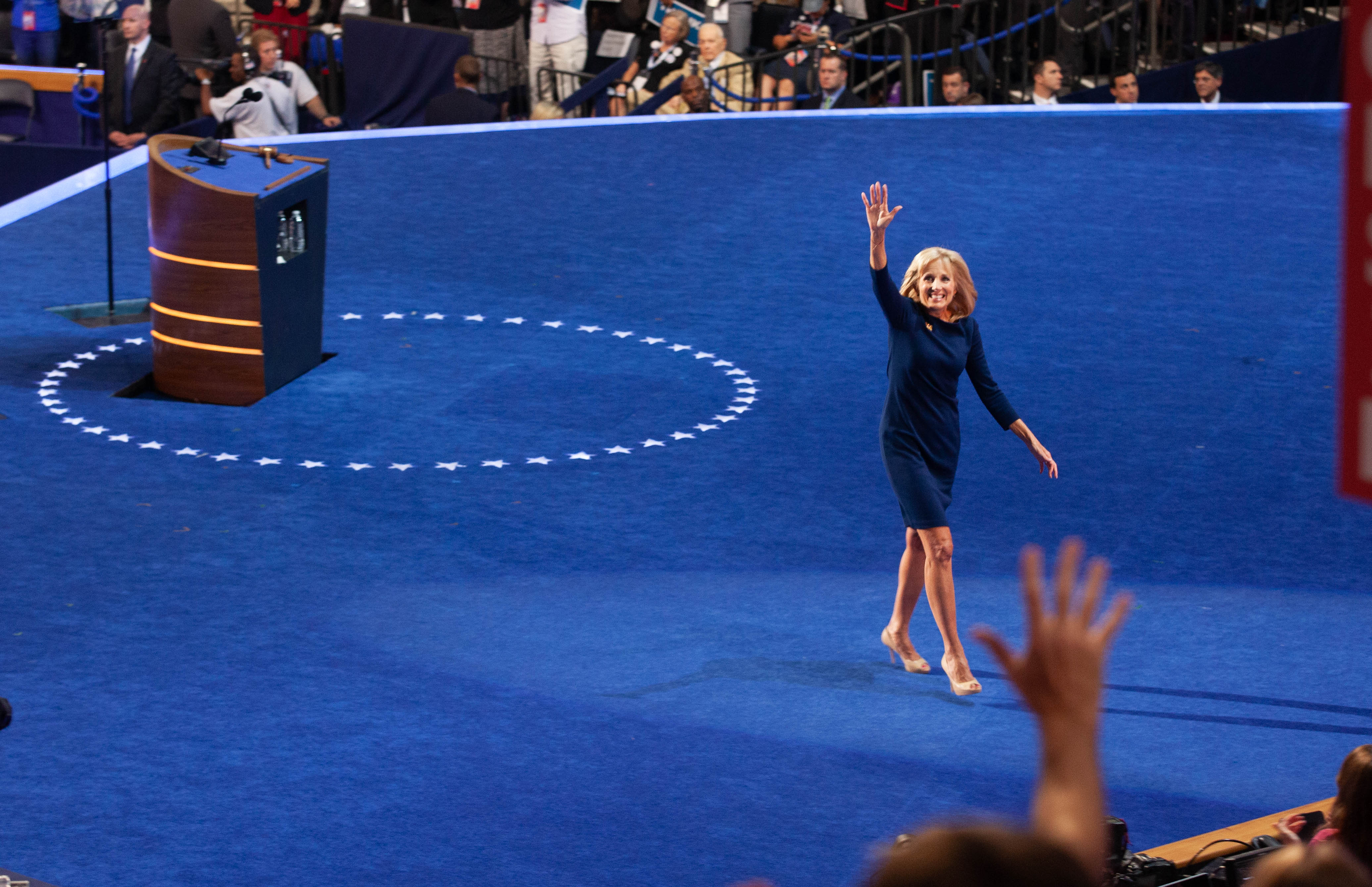
Jill Biden, after finishing her speech at the 2012 Democratic National Convention

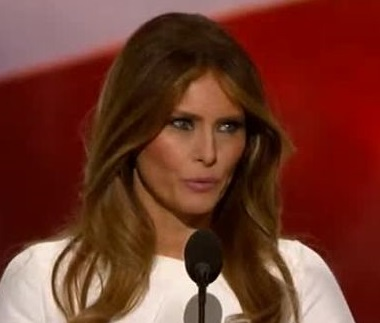
Melania Trump delivering her speech at the 2016 Republican National Convention

=== Purpose ===
Speeches by spouses have typically served to illustrate a softer side of the nominee, with the spouses often sharing humanizing personal anecdotes. In 2012, historian Catherine Allgor opined,

We Americans believe that a wife can tell us about her husband in ways we can’t discern from ads, stump speeches, or even debates: about his personal morality, his character, how he reacts to crisis – in short, who he really is.

George W. Bush speechwriter Matt Latimer noted to NPR in 2016 that most speeches by the spouses of presidential nominees follow the same formula of trying to paint a flattering portrait of the candidate as an individual beyond their public work,

This is somebody who presumably knows the candidate better than anybody else and gives them a side - to the voter, to the media and to the public watching at home - of a candidate that you don't normally see.

The spouse's sharing of anecdotes from their unique perspective on the nominee may also play a role in strengthening public perception of the positive leadership attributes the candidate is touted as holding.

Historian Carl Sferrazza Anthony observed of speeches by the spouses of presidential nominees,

Hearing someone talk about their spouse at conventions nominating them for the presidency simply offers voters a chance to detect some personal qualities about those candidates that suggest how that candidate might respond to issues. Of course they're going to say nice stuff about someone they’ve been married to through thick and thin. Hearing them "humanize" the candidate is not necessarily convincing, but the more important role their speeches can play is to provide context for important biographical accomplishments of their spouse, who would come off offensively egotistical trying to explain this themselves.

In 2012, Allgor and Anthony each opined that the speeches are perhaps an outgrowth of Americans' and their media's long-standing fascination with the spouses of presidents. To this, Allgor wrote,

Speeches by spouses are one of the many aspects of American electoral politics that puzzle the rest of the world...In many western European contests, the voting public doesn’t even know the names of the candidates’ families – but that’s never been true in America. From the first, presidents' wives have been the focus of the public eye.

=== Topics and style ===
In 2014, Tammy R. Vigil published a scholarly analysis of ten speeches delivered by presidential nominee's spouses (Note: at the time of Virgil's 2014 analysis, all major party nominees for the presidency had been male, and their spouses had all been female; this shapes Virgil's commentary on gender dynamics of speeches by spouses of presidential nominees) to conventions between the years 1992 and 2012. She observed,

What emerges are recurring themes and strategies that reinforce a limited perspective on women as political actors. The wives' speeches are restricted to “feminine” political topics or perspectives and reframe the speaking situation in personal terms. The emphasis on tales of home and family also limits the scope of the speakers' perceived expertise and interests. The spouses' speeches embody...the feminine style's use to reinforce a hegemonic masculinity in a traditionally patriarchal political system.

Melania Trump's speech at the 2016 Republican National Convention came under scrutiny when strong similarities were noticed between a section of her remarks and a section of and Michelle Obama's speech at the 2008 Democratic National Convention. The Trump campaign at first denied allegations of plagiarism. Campaign manager Paul Manafort argued that the speech contained "not that many similarities" and the words used are not unique words "that belong to the Obamas." Chris Harrick, Vice President of Marketing at the plagiarism prevention service Turnitin, later reported that Trump used about 6% of Michelle Obama's words and found two types of plagiarism, "clone" and "find and replace".

=== Grade-level analysis of speeches by spouses of presidential nominees ===
Smart Politics (a project of University of Minnesota) conducted Flesch-Kincaid grade level analysis of speeches by the spouses of presidential nominees between 1992 and 2012. In 2016, The Boston Globe conducted similar analysis of the speeches of key speakers at both conventions, including the speeches by presidential nominee spouses.

Speaker	Convention	Reading ease	Words per sentence	Grade level	Cite
Michelle Obama	2012 DNC	57.60	30.66	12.84	
Michelle Obama	2008 DNC	69.08	22.75	9.28	
Teresa Heinz	2004 DNC	61.99	18.46	9.20	
Elizabeth Dole	1996 RNC	61.79	15.56	8.51	
Cindy McCain	2008 RNC	66.19	17.54	8.38	
Hillary Clinton	1996 DNC	68.25	18.32	8.29	
Barbara Bush	1992 RNC	70.75	18.51	7.99	
Laura Bush	2004 RNC	67.44	15.77	7.77	
Bill Clinton	2016 DNC		16.5	7.3	
Melania Trump	2016 RNC		15	6.9	
Tipper Gore	2000 DNC	74.76	15.28	6.63	
Laura Bush	2000 RNC	71.74	12.92	6.46	
Ann Romney	2012 RNC	80.33	15.12	5.80	

== See also ==
- List of keynote speakers at United States presidential nominating conventions
