= Attorney General Pollard =

Attorney General Pollard may refer to:

- John Garland Pollard (1871–1937), Attorney General of Virginia
- Claude Pollard (1874–1942), Attorney General of Texas
