= Satterwhite =

Satterwhite is a surname. Notable people with the surname include:

- Cody Satterwhite (born 1987), American baseball player
- Howard Satterwhite (born 1953), American football player
- Jacolby Satterwhite (born 1986), American artist
- John Satterwhite (1943–2014), American expert shotgun sport shooter/Olympic skeet team leader
- John W. Satterwhite (1841–1885), American politician
- Lee Satterwhite (1871–1959), American politician and newspaper owner
- Stuart C. Satterwhite, American rear admiral
- William T. Satterwhite, American politician

== See also ==
- Eugene Satterwhite Blease (1877–1963), American judge
- Henry Satterwhite Johnson, American educator and politician (1900–1951)
- Thomas Satterwhite Noble (1835–1907), American painter
- 7219 Satterwhite, a main-belt asteroid
