= Albert Burch Curtis =

American politician and lawyer (1875–1955)

- Curtis' portrait for the 37th Texas Legislature

Member of the Texas House of Representatives
- In office January 14, 1919 – January 9, 1923
- Preceded by: Multi-member district
- Succeeded by: Multi-member district
- Constituency: 52-01 district (1919–1921); 52nd district (1921–1923)

Personal details
- Born: September 3, 1875 Tennessee, US
- Died: September 27, 1955 (aged 80) Fort Worth, Texas, US
- Party: Democratic
- Children: 3, including Abb
- Occupation: Politician, lawyer

Albert Burch Curtis (September 3, 1875 – September 27, 1955) was an American politician and lawyer. A Democrat, he was a member of the Texas House of Representatives.

Born in Tennessee, he graduated from Cumberland University. He lived in Oklahoma before moving to Fort Worth, Texas. There, he was a lawyer and a civil servant. He was a member of the House from 1919 to 1923, representing the 54th district.

== Early life and education ==
Curtis was born on September 3, 1875, in Tennessee, the son of James Holland Curtis and Nancy R. (née McDaniel) Curtis. He lived in Cookeville and attended the The Webb School. He studied at Cumberland University, graduating with a law degree.

== Career ==
Curtis then became president of the Cookeville Collegiate Institute. He moved to Ada, Oklahoma at some point after 1901, where he worked as a school superinendent.

In December 1903, Curtis moved to Fort Worth, Texas, establishing a law practice in January of the following year. From 1907 to 1909, he was assistant city attorney, and from 1909 to 1913, was assistant corporation counsel. In 1913 and 1914, he was president of the Worth Board of Health, resigning to return to private law practice. He had established a partnership with brothers Robert McCart and Harry C. McCart by 1915.

Curtis was a Democrat. He was a delegate to the 1916 Texas Democratic Convention, and was one to the National Conventions of 1936, 1940, and 1944. He was a member of the Texas House of Representatives, from January 14, 1919, to January 9, 1923. In his first term, he represented the first seat of the 52nd district, and in his econd term, represented the same district as a whole. He was a candidate for Speaker of the House in his second term, though lost to Charles Graham Thomas. Ideologically, he was progressive.

While serving, Curtis was chairman of the Committee on Oil, Gas and Mining and was vice-chairman of the Judiciary Committee. He was a member of the Committees on Common Carriers; on Conservation and Reclamation; on Game and Fisheries; on Municipal and Private Corporations; and on Public Health. He wrote nine house bills, plus the several he co-authored. One of these bills allowed Tarrant County control of their public infrastructure, and another gave the Railroad Commission of Texas control of natural gas pipelines.

After serving in the House, Curtis worked on a committee of the State Bar of Texas to write a bill creating the 96th District Court, in Tarrant County. In 1926, he unsuccessfully ran for Tarrant's County Court at Law No. 2, placing third in the election, which had four candidates. He was appointed chairman of the Tarrant County Board of Welfare and Employment in 1933, amid the Great Depression. Also in 1933, he was appointed assistant to the Secretary of State of Texas by Governor Miriam A. Ferguson. In November 1933, he was appointed judge of the Second Court of Civil Appeals. In July 1936, he ran in the election for the 96th District Court, placing fifth. He then returned to practicing law, partnering with James E. Mercer.

== Personal life and death ==
On August 7, 1901, Curtis married Lee Ann Johnson, with whom he had three children, including Abb, who became a football and basketball player. He was a Methodist, and was a member of the Knights of Pythias, the Sons of Confederate Veterans, and the Woodmen of the World. He retired in 1953, due to illness. He died on September 27, 1955, aged 80, in Fort Worth, from cirrhosis, and was buried at Laurel Land Memorial Park, in Fort Worth.
