= Melania Trump's speech at the 2016 Republican National Convention =

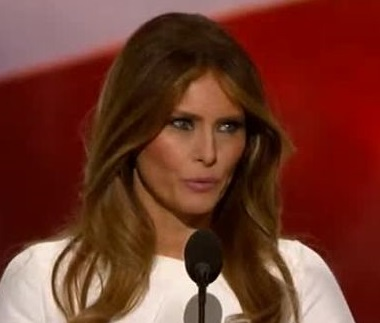
- Trump delivering the speech
- Date: July 18, 2016; 10 years ago
- Duration: 15 minutes
- Venue: Quicken Loans Arena
- Location: Cleveland, Ohio

On the first evening of the 2016 Republican National Convention, Melania Trump (wife of the then-presumptive Republican presidential nominee, Donald Trump) delivered a speech. By 2016, it had for twenty years been a tradition in American politics for the spouses of major party presidential nominees to deliver a convention speech. The speech marked the first major political speech for Trump. Soon after it was delivered, significant attention was given to evident plagiarism of lines from the 2008 Democratic National Convention speech of Michelle Obama (who was the outgoing first lady in 2016).

== Background ==
By 2016, it had, for twenty years, been a tradition that presidential nominees' wives would speak at major party conventions. The speech was anticipated to serve as a major introduction of Melania to many Americans as a possible next First Lady. Trump had previously made very few public speaking appearances during the campaign, typically only campaigning at her husband's side in a non-speaking capacity.

Ahead of delivering the speech, Trump had claimed she had written most of the speech herself "with some help". In actuality, Trump worked on her speech with Meredith McIver, a Trump Organization staffer and occasional ghost writer for her husband's books. Trump had rejected at least two drafts for convention speeches that had been authored by more experienced political speechwriters. The included a draft jointly written by experienced Republican speechwriters Matthew Scully and John McConnell, whom Jared Kushner (the husband of Melania Trump's step-daughter, Ivanka) had asked to draft her a speech.

In her 2024 memoir Melania, Trump reflected on the writing process with McIver, whom she considered to be "a longtime friend", recounting,

During my review of many speeches of previous First Ladies, Michelle [Obama]'s emphasis on the fundamental values of hard work, integrity, and kindness resonated deeply, reflecting the core principles that were instilled in me by my parents during my upbringing in Slovenia. In my discussions with Meredith, I conveyed the significance of parents imparting these values to their children. While I relied on Meredith to help me with the speech and the campaign to review it, I was [initially] pleased with the final result.

The speech was the last prime time address on the opening evening of the convention, and was came after a prime time speech by Rudy Giuliani.

== Summary of speech ==
External videos
- "Melania Trump Remarks at Republican National Convention", July 18, 2016, C-SPAN

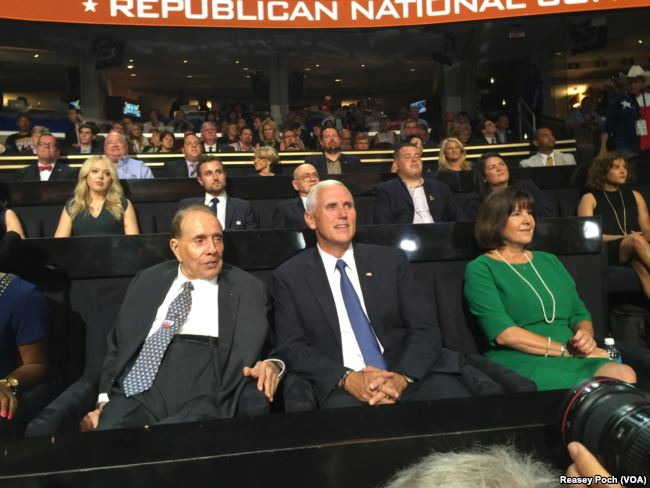
Bob Dole (left), photographed attending the convention (seated beside Donald Trump's running mate Mike Pence and the latter's wife, Karen; and in front of Trump's step-daughter, Tiffany). The speech briefly recognized Dole's presence at the convention.

Before the start of her speech, Trump's husband made a brief appearance on stage to introduce her. Donald Trump entered in theatrical fashion, entering covered by stage fog and bright white backlighting while song "We Are the Champions" by the band Queen played. In his brief introduction, he exclaimed to the crowd, "We're going to win, we're going to win so big." He introduced Melania with the superlatives, "my wife, an amazing mother, an incredible woman".

In her remarks, which lasted approximately fifteen minutes, Trump pitched her husband as a president. She remarked, "if you want someone to fight for you and your country, I can assure you, he is the guy." Acknowledging that her husband had run an unconventional campaign, Trump quipped, "It would not be a Trump contest without excitement and drama."

Her speech did not paint a new image of her husband. Instead, it largely described characteristics others had already highlighted to praise him. This included hailing his perseverance as a businessman. However, her speech did pitch her husband's experience in more gentle language than that her husband typically would use. Trump's use of a gentler tone than her husband also extended to how she spoke of rivals her husband had defeated in the Republican primaries. While her husband continued to insult several of them, she more kindly asserted that the other candidates in the primaries, "deserve respect and gratitude from all of us."

During the speech, Trump briefly gave recognition to the presence of Bob Dole (the 1996 presidential nominee and 1976 vice presidential nominee of the party) in the audience. This was likely noted to counteract the negative publicity that had been generated around other party dignitaries skipping the 2016 convention.

Trump's speech also spoke of inclusivity, and argued that her husband would govern in accordance with such principles. She promised, "Donald intends to represent all the people, not just some of the people. That includes Christians and Jews and Muslims. It includes Hispanics and African Americans and Asians and the poor and the middle class. Throughout his career, Donald has successfully worked with people of many faiths and with many nations." This pledge of inclusively clashed with some of the campaign rhetoric espoused by her husband, who had already called for a ban on Muslims entering the United States.

Trump spoke of her emigration from her native Slovenia, which she noted had been a communist nation, to the United States. She called it the "the greatest privilege on planet Earth" to have moved to New York City in the 1990s and, ten years prior to the convention, become a naturalized citizen.

Trump's remarks did not offer a significant personal anecdote or story to illustrate the nominee's character. This was a departure from a common characteristic of most other convention speeches by the spouses of nominee's, which usually had made use of such storytelling.

At the end of the speech, "We Are the Champions" was again played, and her husband again joined her on stage and embraced her before the crowd.

== Reactions ==
=== Plagiarism controversy ===
Voice of America video comparing Melania Trump's Speech in 2016 with Michelle Obama's in 2008

External image
- "Comparing Melania Trump's Speech in 2016 with Michelle Obama's in 2008", The Washington Post, July 19, 2016. Some portions of the two speeches were "very similar" and other parts were "nearly identical".

Soon after Trump delivered the speech, it received public scrutiny for "striking similarities" between it and Michelle Obama's speech at the 2008 Democratic National Convention. The Trump campaign at first denied allegations of plagiarism. Campaign manager Paul Manafort argued that the speech contained "not that many similarities" and the words used are not unique words "that belong to the Obamas."

Following Trump's speech, freelance journalist Jarrett Hill was the first to report that the speech had large similarities. Later, Chris Harrick, Vice President of Marketing at the plagiarism prevention service Turnitin, later reported that Trump used about 6% of Michelle Obama's words and found two types of plagiarism, "clone" and "find and replace". Various media outlets suggested that members of Donald Trump's presidential campaign should respond to the accusations, which they did a few hours after the speech in the form of the following statement by the campaign's senior communications advisor, Jason Miller: "In writing [the] speech, Melania's team of writers took notes on her life's inspirations, and in some instances included fragments that reflected her own thinking. Melania's immigrant experience and love for America shone through in her speech, which made it a success."

Reince Priebus, chairman of the Republican National Committee, described the speech as "inspirational" but said if plagiarism were found, he thought "it certainly seems reasonable" to fire the person who wrote the speech. Paul Manafort, Donald Trump's campaign chairman, called it a "great speech" and said "obviously Michelle Obama feels very similar sentiments toward her family". He later said "to think that she would be cribbing Michelle Obama's words is crazy", adding "This is once again an example of when a woman threatens Hillary Clinton, she seeks out to demean her and take her down. It's not going to work against Melania Trump." Sean Spicer, director of communications for the Republican National Committee, defended the speech by saying that similar statements have existed before her speech such as quotes by John Legend, Kid Rock, and Twilight Sparkle from My Little Pony: Friendship is Magic.

David Lauter of the Los Angeles Times stated that while these allegations were unlikely to cost Trump votes, the distraction is unhelpful, referring to it as a "lost opportunity" for the campaign.

A meme arose after the speech, in which social media users would post recognizable quotes by other individuals with the hashtag #FamousMelaniaTrumpQuotes.

=== Other reception ===
Daniel D'Addario of Time observed that, apart from the plagiarism controversy, Trump had delivered an otherwise mostly-successful speech, writing,

[Melania] spoke haltingly, seemingly not in complete command of her material—news networks had emphasized the weeks it had taken Melania to craft the speech along with speechwriters, and the speech's provenance quickly came to be questioned, given its glaring similarities to Michelle Obama's Democratic National Convention address in 2008. And yet in the moment her hesitance to take the stage acted in effective counterpoint to the evening's brash tone. It was a conscious downshift in energy for a broadcast whose wild vigor stopped short of becoming permanently alienating for the uninitiated.
Melania did all the things a First Lady is "supposed" to do—and then some.…She addressed her husband’s strengths, telling the audience how strong and decisive Trump would be as president. She made up for his deficiencies, asking the audience to thank all of Trump's primary opponents, something that Trump himself will be unlikely to do in his acceptance speech Thursday. And her outright acknowledgments of the oddities of Trump’s campaign came in the form of smoothly loving jibes.
...Trump's speech was, on its own terms, a wild success in the moment, making it all the more ironic that its impact was negated by charges of plagiarism (that is, if any of Trump’s voters care). Those terms include the introduction of a candidate's wife to a public who’d never met her before and now see an individual rising above an odd circumstance and doing her best, as well as the terms of engagement of a night of broadcast TV otherwise consumed by relitigating past trauma in incredibly heated tones...she could never speak again throughout the campaign, and she’d be fondly remembered for putting a face on the Trump candidacy that was both relatively TV-ready and compellingly not so.

Michael Scherer, of the same publication, noted that Trump had, prior to the plagiarism revelations, "earned high praise for her Republican Convention speech...It was optimistic, compassionate and apparently heartfelt."

Matt Smith of The Guardian wrote,

Until some eagle-eyed viewers called her out [for plagiarism], it had all seemed to go well for Melania in this rare public appearance at the Republican national convention. That may have been relative and had something to do with the two hours of relentless nationalism, scaremongering and emotional manipulation that preceded her. Compared to the politicians who went before, including the raving Rudy Giuliani, [Trump] was a positively Evita-esque breath of fresh air. At last, a flash of razzle-dazzle we had all been promised…[Trump] delivered a calm speech in an unwaveringly strong eastern European accent that appeared to charm most delegates.

== Scholarly analysis ==
An analysis of modality in Trump's speech published in the Journal of Language and Literature in April 2017 concluded that,

There are four types of modality in [Trump's speech]. Those are inclination, obligation, potentiality and ability, and probability. The modal of inclination appears 12 times. It is 46.2%. There are nine high-levels, two mid-levels, and one low-level of inclination. The modal of obligation and probability appears twice, presented in 7.7%. In obligation, one sentence is included as high level and another one is included in mid level. All of the probabilities are included as mid-level. The last, potentiality and ability, appear 10 times, presented in 38.4%

A Flesch–Kincaid analysis of the speech published by The Boston Globe measured its words per sentence at 15, and assessed its grade level at 6.9.

A 2018 analysis published in the John Marshall Review of Intellectual Property Law concluded that Trump's speech met the legal standard for copyright infringement upon Obama's 2008 convention speech.

== Aftermath ==
Initially, the Trump campaign denied that any similarities to Michelle Obama's speech were due to plagiarism, arguing that Trump's speech was entirely original in composition and that any shared language had not been unique to Obama's earlier speech. Donald Trump's senior communications advisor Jason Miller characterized the writing process for the speech, "in writing her beautiful speech, Melania's team of writers took notes on her life's inspirations, and in some instances included fragments that reflected her own thinking. Melania's immigrant experience and love for America shone through in her speech, which made it such a success." Trump campaign spokespeople, including Katrina Pierson, initially characterized the suggestion that any language had been lifted from Michelle Obama to be "absurd".

July 20, two days after the speech, McIver publicly took the blame for plagiarism snafu. McIver, however, noted that Donald Trump declined her offer to resign. The Trump campaign issued a statement by McIver in which she stated,

In working with Melania on her recent first lady speech, we discussed many people who inspired her and messages she wanted to share with the American people. A person she has always liked is Michelle Obama. Over the phone, she read me some passages from Mrs. Obama's speech as examples. I wrote them down and later included some of the phrasing in the draft that ultimately became the final speech.

During the following week's Democratic National Convention, actress Elizabeth Banks parodied Donald Trump's entrance to "We Are the Champions" by re-enacting it and joking about how it was "over the top". The day following the speech, The Late Show with Stephen Colbert parodied Melania Trump's speech and the plagiarism allegations in a cold open which featured actress Laura Benanti portraying Trump. This was the first of many skits on the series featuring Benanti's impression of Trump, which became a recurring feature of The Late Show with Stephen Colbert through the series' final season. In an September 2016 interview on the same television program, Obama herself answered a question from host Stephen Colbert on if she felt any sympathy for Melania Trump being the face such a high-profile blunder, answering, "Yeah, that was tough".

During the Alfred E. Smith Dinner in October 2016 (at which both Donald Trump and his opponent, Hillary Clinton, delivered comedic remarks), Donald Trump got his loudest laugh for a joke about the plagiarism scandal, "Michelle Obama gives a speech. And everyone loves it, it's fantastic. They think she's absolutely great. My wife Melania gives the exact same speech. And people get on her case. And I don’t get it. I don’t know why."

After the convention, Melania Trump did not deliver another public speech until November 3 (days before the election). The plagiarism controversy persisted as a prominent point of discussion regarding Trump for years after she delivered the speech. In her 2024 memoir, Trump admitted that the speech included "undeniable similarities" to Obama's 2008 convention speech, and wrote that she felt "a profound sense of betrayal" from campaign staff members, who she faulted for "fail[ing] to implement even the most fundamental safeguard," rhetorically asking, "Why was the speech not vetted?"

Trump delivered a speech when her husband was re-nominated at the 2020 Republican National Convention. She did not speak at the 2024 Republican National Convention, when her husband was again the presidential nominee. This broke a streak (started in 1996) of the spouses of nominees of both parties having spoken at the major party conventions.
