= Abb Curtis =

American football and basketball player (1902–1981)

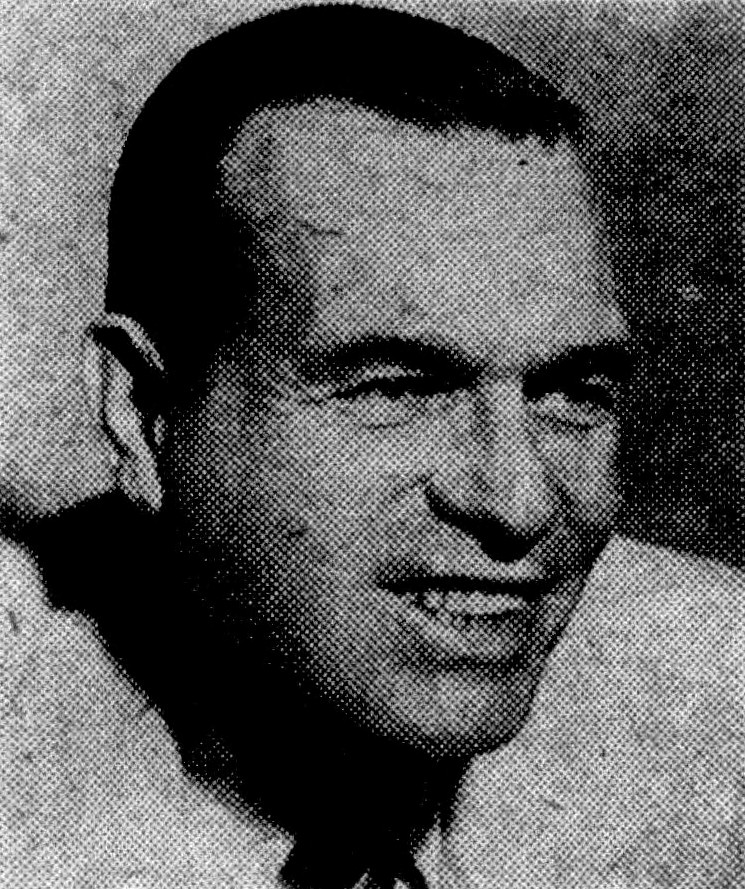
- Curtis, c. 1949

Personal information
- Born: September 5, 1902 Ada, Oklahoma, US
- Died: July 16, 1981 (aged 78)

Career information
- High school: R. L. Paschal (Fort Worth, Texas)
- Position: Guard

Career highlights
- All-American - 1924; All-Southwest Conference - 1924; Southwest Conference Champion - 1924

Albert S. Curtis (September 5, 1902 – July 16, 1981) was American football and basketball player, later a coach and sports official. He was an All-American basketball player for the University of Texas at Austin, where he also played college football.

== Early life and education ==
Curtis was born in Ada, Oklahoma, the son of politician Albert Burch Curtis. He attended Fort Worth Central High School, where he was a 3-sport star in basketball, football and baseball and entered UT in the fall of 1920.

== College career ==
Curtis played both basketball and football at the University of Texas from 1922 to 1924. In his senior year, Curtis played on first-year football and basketball head coach E. J. "Doc" Stewart's undefeated football (8–0–1) and undefeated Southwest Conference champion basketball (23–0) teams. The 1924 Longhorn basketball team received a retroactive national ranking of No. 3 in the Premo-Porretta Power Poll.

Curtis was a 3x letterman at guard for the basketball team for three seasons from 1922 to 1924. In 1924 Curtis was recognized as a consensus first-team All-American in basketball. As of 2015 he was one of only seven Longhorn men's basketball players ever to receive that honor.

Curtis was inducted into the UT Athletics Men's Hall of Honor in 1969.

== Later Life ==
After graduating, Curtis spent three years as the head football coach at Fort Worth Central High School and then transitioned to working as a basketball and football referee.

Curtis officiated several important games including multiple Cotton Bowls, the NCAA Basketball Championship, the 1935 Rose Bowl game and the 1939 Sugar Bowl featuring national champion TCU.

Curtis became president of the Southwest Football Officials Association. In 1949 he was hired as supervisor of officials for the Pacific Coast Conference. He became Southwest conference assistant executive secretary and supervisor of game officials in 1950 and served in that role until his retirement in 1967. He was on the NCAA Rules Committee for 6 years during this time. In 1962, he testified before the Texas House following a point-shaving scandal involving Southwest Conference basketball officials and players.

Following his retirement, Curtis was selected to the Texas Sports Hall of Fame in 1973. In 1982, he was inducted into the Texas Basketball Hall of Fame.
