= Eleanor Roosevelt's speech at the 1940 Democratic National Convention =

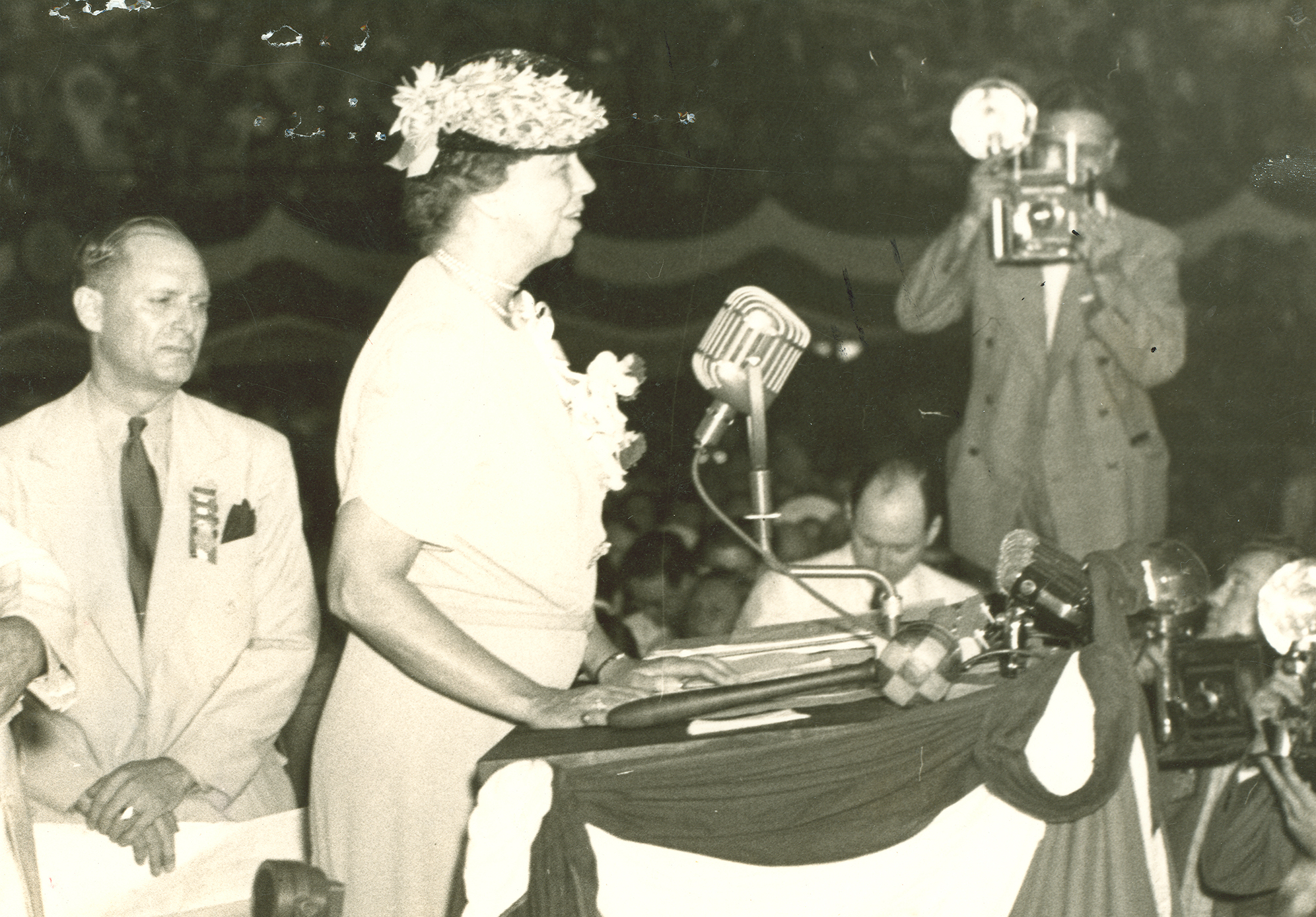
- Roosevelt delivering the speech
- Date: July 18, 1940; 86 years ago
- Venue: Chicago Stadium
- Location: Chicago, Illinois

Eleanor Roosevelt (the First Lady of the United States) delivered a speech to the 1940 Democratic National Convention which returned order to a convention that had grown discordant over the pending nomination of Henry A. Wallace as the vice presidential running mate of her husband, President Franklin D. Roosevelt. It was the first-ever instance of a speech by a spouse of a nominee at a United States presidential nominating convention. Roosevelt's three minute unscripted speech was delivered with only a single page of notes, and has been dubbed the "No Ordinary Time" speech.

== Background ==
First Lady Eleanor Roosevelt delivered a speech to the 1940 Democratic National Convention. Roosevelt was extraordinarily politically active as first lady of United States. Her husband, incumbent president Franklin Delano Roosevelt, was seeking re-election to an unprecedented third term in the 1940 United States presidential election. The speech marked the first instance in which a major party nominee's spouse spoke before a presidential nominating convention. Roosevelt's husband had opted not to attend the convention himself. While he had broken with tradition eight years earlier to attend the 1932 Democratic National Convention, in seeking an already-unprecedented third term as president, he opted to adhere more to the tradition of avoiding openly campaigning for the office himself.

The selection of Henry A. Wallace as the Roosevelt administration's preferred vice presidential running mate had brought discord to the convention, as many delegates did not approve of this selection. Due to this, a request was made to Eleanor Roosevelt for her to fly on an airplane to Chicago and deliver a speech to calm the delegates. Eleanor Roosevelt was well-liked among the Democratic Party faithful. She was successfully urged to do so by both her husband (who was in Washington, D.C.) and Frances Perkins (who was at the convention, in Chicago).

Roosevelt's notes for the speech

When Roosevelt walked to the podium, the uproarious convention crowed quite to hear her remarks. She delivered largely-extemporaneous remarks referencing only a single page of notes which read,

Thank Jim (Note: referring to convention chairman James Farley) for his work with National Committee.

Enjoyed working in close touch with him as it gave me a chance to know how invaluable and unselfish has been his loyalty and devotion to the President and to the democratic party.

Thank delegates for their confidence in the President.

These are serious times, and not a time when the President can make a regular campaign, so responsibility is great on each and everyone of them. Real education is needed so voters will understand aims and objectives and policies of the administration, both domestic and foreign.

This means each one of us have firm convictions and work harder than we have ever worked before.

World condition. Our probable situation in the future.

This is a time for all of us to lay aside our personal feelings and unite. Only in unity can we be really be prepared to defend ourselves against the insidious philosophy of the totalitarian idea.

== Summary of speech ==
Roosevelt argued that extraordinary times required unity, an argument intended to bolster sentiments support of her husband's efforts to win a third term in the general election. Without explicitly referring either to her husband's pursuit of the third term, nor Wallace, she made an implicit case that the challenges of the moment made it necessary that nominees act to unify behind a ticket that included Wallace as her husband's running mate.

In her remarks, Roosevelt declared,

You must know that this is the time when all good men and women give every bit of service and strength to their country that they have to give. This is the time when it is the United States that we fight for, the domestic policies that we have established as a party that we must believe in, that we must carry forward, and in the world we have a position of great responsibility.
We cannot tell from day to day what may come. This is no ordinary time. No time for weighing anything except what we can do best for the country as a whole, and that responsibility rests on each and every one of us as individuals.
No man who is a candidate or who is President can carry this situation alone. This is only carried by a united people who love their country and who will live for it to the fullest of their ability, with the highest ideals, with a determination that their party shall be absolutely devoted to the good of the nation as a whole and to doing what this country can to bring the world to a safer and happier condition.

== Aftermath ==
The three minute speech was followed by rapturous applause from the crowd. Roosevelt's brief unscripted speech succeeded at returning order to the convention. While Roosevelt's speech did not mention Wallace by name, her call for unity was seen as an implicit endorsement of an expedient nomination of him onto the ticket. Hours later the delegates nominated Wallace. Crediting Roosevelt's speech for this, Senator from Nebraska George W. Norris wrote her the following day,

I am convinced beyond any doubt that the country owes you a debt of gratitude it can never repay…Citizens all over our land are today thanking God that you were there at the right time, to say the right thing in the right place.

Roosevelt's secretary, Malvina Thompson reported that in the days after the speech, Roosevelt was "swamped with wires and letters of approval". In his own autobiography, the convention's chairman, James Farley, opined of the speech that, "I felt, truthfully, if she had not come to Chicago, the President would not have been able to get Wallace [nominated]"

The remarks have been referred to as the "No Ordinary Time" speech. The biography No Ordinary Time takes its title from the speech.
