= Charles Graham Thomas =

American politician and businessman (1879–1937)

- Thomas' Speaker portrait for the 37th Texas Legislature

Member of the Texas House of Representatives from the 46th district
- In office January 9, 1917 – January 9, 1923
- Preceded by: George Milton Hopkins
- Succeeded by: Marcus Monroe Duffey

Speaker of the Texas House of Representatives
- In office January 11, 1921 – January 9, 1923
- Preceded by: R. Ewing Thomason
- Succeeded by: Richard Ernest Seagler

Personal details
- Born: December 10, 1879 Richardson, Texas, US
- Died: February 14, 1937 (aged 57) Van Alstyne, Texas, US
- Party: Democratic
- Occupation: Politician, businessman

Charles Graham Thomas (December 10, 1879 – February 14, 1937) was an American politician and businessman. A Democrat, he was a member of the Texas House of Representatives, including a term as Speaker of the House.

== Early life and education ==
Thomas was born on December 10, 1879, near Richardson, Texas, the son of Charles I. Thomas and Emma A. (née Graham) Thomas. At age two, his family moved to Lewisville, where he lived for the rest of his life, with exception of two years spent in Cleburne. In 1898, he graduated from Baylor University, with Bachelor of Arts, becoming the university's youngest graduate at the time. While attending, he participated on its debate team.

== Career ==
After graduating, Thomas worked for his father's dry goods company. He established a successful lumber company, which he left in December 1914 to become an insurance agent and real estate broker. He was a cashier and director of the First National Bank of Lewisville, as well as a shareholder of the Denton County National Bank. For a time, he was a business partner of M. D. Fagg, his brother-in-law.

Thomas was a Democrat. He was a member of the Texas House of Representatives, from January 9, 1917, to January 9, 1923, representing the 46th district. He was Speaker of the House, from January 11, 1921, to January 9, 1923, defeating Albert Burch Curtis in election to the office. He was chairman of the Committee on Appropriations, and was a member of the Committees on Banks and Banking; on Congressional Districts; on Federal Relations; on Insurance; on Supreme Judicial Districts; and on Rules.

After serving, Thomas returned to his business career, working as such until 1935. He was then made secretary of the Texas Relief Commission. In 1937, he worked for the Texas Board of Control, resigning the same year due to illness.

== Personal life and death ==
On June 12, 1901, Thomas married Roberta Lovelace Everett, with whom he had four children. He was Baptist. He died on February 14, 1937, aged 57, in Van Alstyne, from a stroke. He was buried at Old Hall Cemetery, in Lewisville.
