= Lee Satterwhite =

American politician and newspaperman (1871–1959)

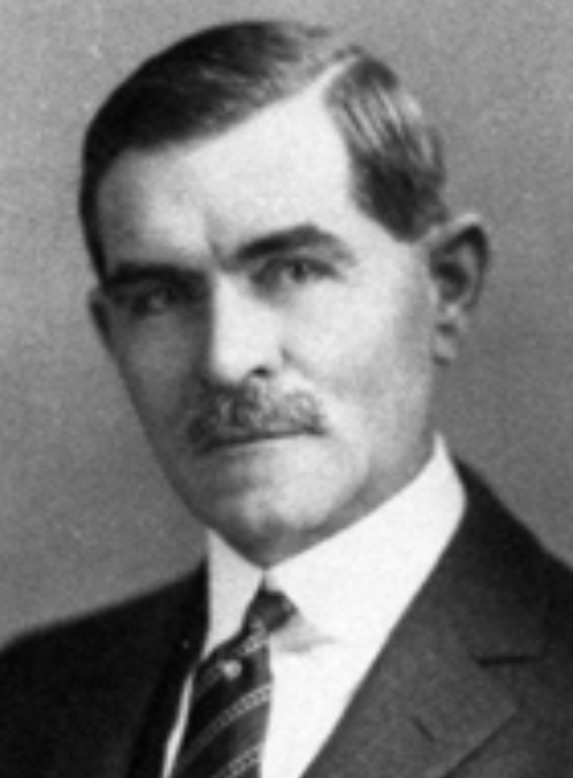
- Satterwhite's portrait for the 39th Texas Legislature

Member of the Texas House of Representatives
- In office January 8, 1901 – January 13, 1903
- Constituency: 57th district
- In office January 14, 1919 – January 8, 1929
- Constituency: 125th district (1919–1923); 123rd district (1923–1927)
- In office January 13, 1931 – January 10, 1933
- Constituency: 8th district

Speaker of the Texas House of Representatives
- In office January 13, 1925 – January 11, 1927
- Preceded by: Richard Ernest Seagler
- Succeeded by: Robert L. Bobbitt

Personal details
- Born: Robert Lee Satterwhite; January 28, 1871 Nevada County, Arkansas, US
- Died: November 29, 1959 (aged 88) Houston, Texas, US
- Party: Democratic
- Relations: W. R. Basden (grandfather)
- Occupation: Politician, newspaperman

Robert Lee Satterwhite (January 28, 1871 – November 29, 1959) was an American politician and newspaperman. A Democrat, he was a member of the Texas House of Representatives, including a term as Speaker of the House.

== Early life ==
Satterwhite was born on January 28, 1871, in Nevada County, Arkansas, the son of James L. Satterwhite and Mary Jane (née Basden) Satterwhite. His maternal grandfather was W. R. Basden, a member of the Arkansas House of Representatives. He was named for Robert E. Lee. In 1885, he and his family moved to Freestone County, Texas.

== Career ==
In Freestone County, Satterwhite worked as a farmer and a printer, for two years and for four years, respectively. In 1893, he founded the Wortham Signal, later becoming editor and publisher of the Wortham Journal. In 1898, he fought in the Spanish–American War, as a member of the Second Texas Regiment.

Satterwhite was a Democrat. He was a member of the Texas House of Representatives, from January 8, 1901, to January 13, 1903. He served again, from January 14, 1919, to January 8, 1929, and again from January 13, 1931, to January 10, 1933. He represented the 57th district in his first term; the 125th district in his second and third term; the 123rd district in his fourth, fifth, and sixth term; and the 8th district in his seventh and final term. In his fifth term, from January 13, 1925, to January 11, 1927, he was Speaker of the House. While Speaker, he oversaw reforms to the state law.

While in the House, Satterwhite was chairman of the Committees on Appropriations and on Penitentiaries, as well as vice-chairman of the Committees on Enrolled Bills and on Penitentiaries. He was a member of the Committees on Agricultural Affairs; on the Blind Asylum; on Claims and Accounts; on Congressional Districts; on the Judiciary; on Labor; on Live Stock and Stock Raising; on Military Affairs; on North Texas Normal College; on Privileges, Suffrage and Elections; on Public Printing; on Revenue and Taxation; on Rules; on Senatorial Districts.

From 1903 to 1909, Satterwhite operated a farm in Knox County. In December 1909, he moved to Tulia, and in 1913, founded the Tulia Enterprise. The newspaper failed, and in 1915, he moved to Panhandle, where he purchased the Panhandle Herald by the following year. In 1923, he moved to Amarillo. In 1927, he moved to Odessa, where he farmed. From 1933 to 1948, he lived in Austin. In 1947, he retired to Houston, living there for the remainder of his life. He was an unsuccessful candidate in the 1944 Texas lieutenant gubernatorial election and the 1946 Texas State House of Representatives Election.

== Personal life and death ==
On August 17, 1893, Satterwhite married Bessie Weaver, with whom he had four children. She died in 1920, after which he married Lula Satterwhite. He was a Missionary Baptist. He died on November 29, 1959, aged 88, in Houston, and was buried at Panhandle Cemetery.
