= Robert L. Bobbitt =

American lawyer and politician (1888–1972)

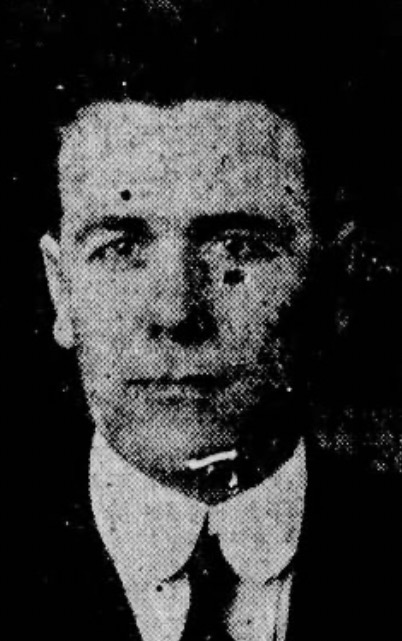
- Bobbitt in 1928

Texas Attorney General
- In office September 1929 – January 1931
- Governor: Dan Moody
- Preceded by: Claude Pollard
- Succeeded by: James V. Allred

Member of the Texas House of Representatives from the 75th district
- In office January 9, 1923 – January 8, 1929 Serving with Herbert Spencer Bonham
- Preceded by: Samuel Randolph Boyd
- Succeeded by: Edward Alexander Mullally

Speaker of the Texas House of Representatives
- In office January 11, 1927 – January 8, 1929
- Preceded by: Lee Satterwhite
- Succeeded by: Wingate S. Barron

Personal details
- Born: Robert Lee Bobbitt; January 24, 1888 Hillsboro, Texas, US
- Died: September 14, 1972 (aged 84) San Antonio, Texas, US
- Party: Democratic
- Relations: Hugh S. Cluck
- Occupation: Lawyer, politician

Military service
- Allegiance: United States
- Branch/service: United States Army; Field Artillery Branch
- Years of service: 1917–1919
- Rank: Captain
- Unit: 90th Infantry Division
- Battles/wars: World War I

Robert Lee Bobbitt Sr. (January 24, 1888 – September 14, 1972) was an American lawyer and politician. Born near Hillsboro, Texas, he studied at the University of North Texas and the University of Texas at Austin School of Law. He practiced as a lawyer and served in World War I. A Democrat, he was a member of the Texas House of Representatives for three terms, including a term as Speaker of the House, and was later the Texas Attorney General.

== Early life, education, and early career ==
Bobbitt was born on January 24, 1888, on a cotton farm near Hillsboro, Texas, one of seven children born to pioneer Joseph Alderson Bobbitt and Laura Abigail (née Duff) Bobbitt. He was named for Robert E. Lee. He worked on the farm as a child, living there until age 22.

After leaving the farm, Bobbitt enrolled in the Carlisle Military Academy. He then studied at the University of North Texas, receiving a teaching certificate (he never worked as an educator). In 1915, he graduated from the University of Texas at Austin School of Law.

While in college, Bobbitt worked in food service, lawncare, and as a clerk at the Texas State Capitol library. After receiving the license to practice law, he established a partnership in Laredo, later working in San Antonio.

During World War I, Bobbitt served in the 90th Infantry Division, enlisting as a private in October 1917. He was transferred to a Field Artillery Branch facility in South Carolina prior to the 90th Division being sent to France, and thus never saw combat. He rose to the rank of captain and was honorably discharged in 1919. After serving, he joined the law firm Hicks, Phelps, Dickerson, & Bobbitt.

== Politics and later career ==
Bobbitt was a Democrat, serving on the Texas Democratic Centeal Committee from 1920 to 1922. He was a member of the Texas House of Representatives, from January 9, 1923, to January 8, 1929, representing the 75th district. He was unanimously named Speaker of the House, serving from January 11, 1927, to January 8, 1929. He helped block a bill pardoning Governor James E. Ferguson.

While in the House, Bobbitt was chairman of the Judiciary Committee and vice-chairman of the Joint Committee on Sale of State Property, Investigate, as well as a member of the Committees on Appropriations; on Banks and Banking; on Criminal Jurisprudence; on Education; on Game and Fisheries; on Live Stock and Stock Raising; and on Oil, Gas and Mining.

In 1928, Bobbitt became district attorney for Dimmit, Jim Hogg, Webb, and Zapata Counties. He served as Texas Attorney General from September 1929 to January 1931, having been appointed by Governor Dan Moody as intermin attorney general following the resignation of Claude Pollard. He lost the following election for the office to James V. Allred.

In 1931 or 1934, Bobbitt returned to practicing law in San Antonio. He was a member of the partnership Bobbitt, Brite, Bobbit, & Allen. He was a member of the Texas A&M University–Kingsville board of directors. From 1935 until his resignation in 1937, he was an associate justice of the 4th San Antonio Court of Civil Appeals. From 1937 to 1943, he was chairman of the Texas Highway Commission. He was a Presidential elector in the 1944 election. In 1958, he was a member of the University of North Texas Board of Regents, being appointed by Governor Price Daniel.

== Personal life and death ==
On April 20, 1918, Bobbitt married Mary Belle Westbrook, the sister-in-law of Laredo mayor Hugh S. Cluck; they had a son together. He was Presbyterian, as well as a member of the American Judicature Society, the American Legion, the Boy Scouts of America, the Newcomen Society of the United States.

Bobbitt died on September 14, 1972, aged 84, in San Antonio, and was buried on September 16, at Mission Burial Park South, in San Antonio. In 1974, the Texas Historical Commission installed a commemorative plaque in Medina County, in his honor.
