= Richard Ernest Seagler =

American politician (1883–1956)

Speaker of the Texas House of Representatives
- In office January 9, 1923 – April 5, 1924
- Preceded by: Charles Graham Thomas
- Succeeded by: Lee Satterwhite

Member of the Texas House of Representatives
- In office January 9, 1923 – April 5, 1924
- Constituency: 55th district
- In office January 14, 1919 – January 9, 1923
- Constituency: 25th district

Personal details
- Born: December 3, 1883 Tennessee Colony, Anderson County, Texas, United States
- Died: January 6, 1956 (aged 72)
- Party: Democratic
- Occupation: Attorney

Richard Ernest Seagler (December 3, 1883 – January 6, 1956) was an American politician and lawyer.

Born in Tennessee Colony, Anderson County, Texas, Seagler attended North Texas State Normal College, graduating in 1908, then obtained a law degree from the University of Texas, Austin, in 1912.

Seagler worked for a brief period as a trial attorney in Palestine, Texas before entering politics.

Between 1919 and 1924, Seagler served as a Democrat in the Texas House of Representatives, including a period as Speaker of the House for the 38th Legislature (1923–1924).

Seagler was subsequently employed by the legal department of Humble Oil and Refining Company, which became ExxonMobil, and in 1938 became the company's general attorney. He left in 1948 to set up his own practice in Houston.
