= Claude Pollard =

American lawyer (1874–1942)

Pollard in a 1929 newspaper

Claude Pollard (February 14, 1874 – November 25, 1942) was the attorney general of Texas from 1927 to 1929. During his service in public office he defended laws aimed at the disenfranchisement of black voters.

== Early life ==
Pollard was born on February 14, 1874, the son of Hamilton Pollar and Sarah Jane (née Davis) Pollard. A native of Carthage, Texas, he graduated from one of its public schools. He became a teacher, but left the job when he entered the University of Texas at Austin to study for a law degree.

== Legal career ==
Immediately after his admittance to the Texas Bar in 1895, Pollard was elected Panola County Attorney, a position he held until 1898. He was appointed United States Attorney by President William McKinley in 1900. In 1905, he was chosen as assistant Attorney General of Texas, serving under Attorney General Robert V. Davidson from 1905 to 1909.

In 1909, Pollard became counsel for St. Louis, Brownsville and Mexico Railway in Kingsville, Texas, where the railroad had recently run a line through the King Ranch. With the arrival of the SLB&M Railway, Kingsville began to grow and citizens sought to form a new county out of southern Nueces County. Pollard was one of the men responsible for the formation of Kleberg County, which mostly consisted of the King Ranch.

Even though Pollard had left behind his teaching career, he remained active in education, serving as regent of South Texas State Teachers College (now Texas A&I University). In 1916, Pollard went into private practice of law helping to found the Houston, Texas law firm of Vinson, Elkins, Wood and Pollard. Pollard was elected president of the State Bar of Texas in 1920.

== Political career ==
In 1926, Pollard secured the Democratic nomination for Attorney General, defeating James V. Allred narrowly, which meant that his election in the General Election was practically assured. Upon taking office, Pollard defended the Texas white primary law in the United States Supreme Court case of Nixon v. Herndon. The Texas White Primary Law prohibited blacks from voting in the Texas Primary. Because of the almost complete control of the Texas government by Democrats, the primary election was the more important election to participate in. "Pollard invited the Court to ignore reality contending that, 'a nominating primary of the Democratic Democratic Party is not a public election under the constitution of the state'". The Court found otherwise and struck down the Texas law.

Although Pollard was reelected to his post, he did not complete his second term, choosing instead to resign in September 1929 so that he could serve the Railway General Managers' Association of Texas as its counsel. Following his death on November 25, 1942 in Austin, Texas, he was buried in the Texas State Cemetery.

Party political offices
Preceded by Dan Moody	Democratic nominee for Texas Attorney General; 1926, 1928	Succeeded by James V. Allred
Political offices
Preceded by Dan Moody	Attorney General of Texas; 1927—1929	Succeeded by Robert L. Bobbitt
