= 1944 Texas lieutenant gubernatorial election =

- November 7, 1944

Nominee	John Lee Smith	John A. Donaldson
Party	Democratic	Republican
Popular vote	1,007,691	102,532
Percentage	90.76%	9.24%
Lieutenant Governor before election
John Lee Smith
Democratic
Elected Lieutenant Governor
John Lee Smith
Democratic

The 1944 Texas lieutenant gubernatorial election was held on November 7, 1944, in order to elect the lieutenant governor of Texas. Incumbent Democratic lieutenant governor John Lee Smith defeated Republican nominee John A. Donaldson.

== General election ==
On election day, November 7, 1944, incumbent Democratic lieutenant governor John Lee Smith won re-election by a margin of 905,159 votes against his opponent Republican nominee John A. Donaldson, thereby retaining Democratic control over the office of lieutenant governor. Smith was sworn in for his second term on January 16, 1945.

=== Results ===
Texas lieutenant gubernatorial election, 1944
Party	Candidate	Votes	%
Democratic	John Lee Smith (incumbent)	1,007,691	90.76
Republican	John A. Donaldson	102,532	9.24
Total votes		1,110,223	100.00
Democratic hold			
