= Sam Rayburn =

American politician (1882–1961)

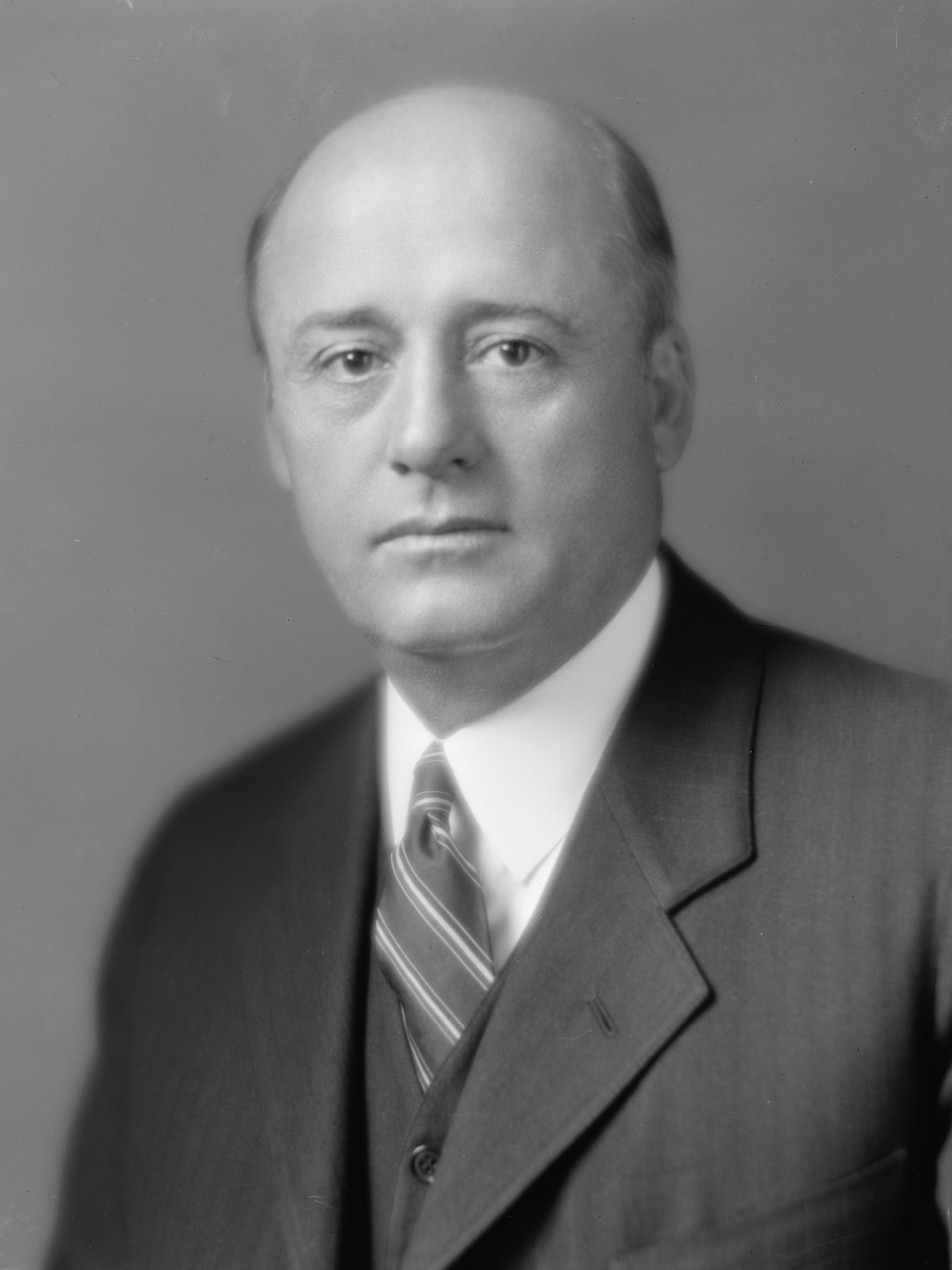
- Rayburn in 1950

43rd Speaker of the United States House of Representatives
- In office January 3, 1955 – November 16, 1961
- Preceded by: Joseph W. Martin Jr.
- Succeeded by: John W. McCormack
- In office January 3, 1949 – January 3, 1953
- Preceded by: Joseph W. Martin Jr.
- Succeeded by: Joseph W. Martin Jr.
- In office September 16, 1940 – January 3, 1947
- Preceded by: William B. Bankhead
- Succeeded by: Joseph W. Martin Jr.
House positions
37th Dean of the United States House of Representatives
In office January 3, 1953 – November 16, 1961
Preceded by	Robert L. Doughton
Succeeded by	Carl Vinson
House Minority Leader
In office January 3, 1953 – January 3, 1955
Deputy	John W. McCormack
Preceded by	Joseph W. Martin Jr.
Succeeded by	Joseph W. Martin Jr.
In office January 3, 1947 – January 3, 1949
Deputy	John W. McCormack
Preceded by	Joseph W. Martin Jr.
Succeeded by	Joseph W. Martin Jr.
Leader of the House Democratic Caucus
In office September 16, 1940 – November 16, 1961
Preceded by	William B. Bankhead
Succeeded by	John W. McCormack
House Majority Leader
In office January 3, 1937 – September 16, 1940
Deputy	Patrick J. Boland
Preceded by	William B. Bankhead
Succeeded by	John W. McCormack
Chair of the Committee on Interstate and Foreign Commerce
In office March 4, 1931 – January 3, 1937
Preceded by	James S. Parker
Succeeded by	Clarence F. Lea
Chair of the House Democratic Caucus
In office March 4, 1921 – March 4, 1923
Leader	Claude Kitchin
Preceded by	Arthur G. DeWalt
Succeeded by	Henry T. Rainey

Member of the U.S. House of Representatives from Texas's 4th district
- In office March 4, 1913 – November 16, 1961
- Preceded by: Choice B. Randell
- Succeeded by: Ray Roberts

Speaker of the Texas House of Representatives
- In office January 10, 1911 – January 14, 1913
- Preceded by: John Wesley Marshall
- Succeeded by: Chester H. Terrell

Member of the Texas House of Representatives from the 34th district
- In office January 8, 1907 – January 14, 1913
- Preceded by: Rosser Thomas
- Succeeded by: Robert Reuben Williams

Personal details
- Born: Samuel Taliaferro Rayburn; January 6, 1882 Kingston, Tennessee, U.S.
- Died: November 16, 1961 (aged 79) Bonham, Texas, U.S.
- Party: Democratic
- Spouse: Metze Jones (m. 1927; div. 1927)
- Education: East Texas Normal College; University of Texas School of Law
- Profession: Lawyer

Samuel Taliaferro Rayburn (January 6, 1882 – November 16, 1961) was an American politician who served as the 43rd speaker of the United States House of Representatives. He was a three-time House speaker, former House majority leader, two-time House minority leader, and a 25-term congressman, representing Texas's 4th congressional district as a Democrat from 1913 to 1961. He holds the record for the longest tenure as Speaker of the United States House of Representatives, serving for over 17 years (among his three separate tenures).

Born in Roane County, Tennessee, Rayburn moved with his family to Windom, Texas, in 1887. Sam T. Rayburn graduated from East Texas Normal College, Class of 1903. After a period as a school teacher, Rayburn won election to the Texas House of Representatives and graduated from the University of Texas School of Law. He won election to the United States House of Representatives in 1912 and continuously won re-election until his death in 1961, serving a total of 25 terms. Rayburn was a protégé of John Nance Garner and a mentor to Lyndon B. Johnson.

Rayburn was elected House Majority Leader in 1937 and was elevated to the position of Speaker of the House after the death of William B. Bankhead. He led the House Democrats from 1940 to 1961, and served as Speaker of the House from 1940 to 1947, 1949 to 1953, and 1955 to 1961. Rayburn also served twice as House Minority Leader (1947 to 1949 and 1953 to 1955) during periods of Republican House control. He preferred to work quietly in the background and successfully used his power of persuasion and charisma to get his bills passed due to having to navigate the post-Joseph Cannon era when each individual committee chairman had immense power in the House.

Along with Senate Majority Leader Lyndon Johnson and most of the Texan Representatives, Rayburn refused to sign the 1956 Southern Manifesto and helped shepherd the passage of the Civil Rights Acts of 1957 and 1960, the first civil rights bills passed by the U.S. Congress since the Enforcement Acts and the Civil Rights Act of 1875 during Reconstruction (1865–1877). Rayburn was also influential in the construction of U.S. Route 66. He served as Speaker until his death in 1961, and was succeeded by John W. McCormack. He is the most recent Speaker of the House to die in office.

== Early life ==
Rayburn was born in Roane County, Tennessee, on January 6, 1882. He was the son of Martha Clementine (Waller) and William Marion Rayburn, a former Confederate cavalryman. The Rayburn family descended from Ulster Scots immigrants who emigrated to the Province of Pennsylvania in 1750. In 1887, the Rayburn family moved to a 40-acre cotton farm near Windom, Texas. Rayburn grew up in poverty as he, his nine siblings, and his parents all participated in running the farm. Toiling in the fields made Rayburn determined to get a good education and help the poor and downtrodden.

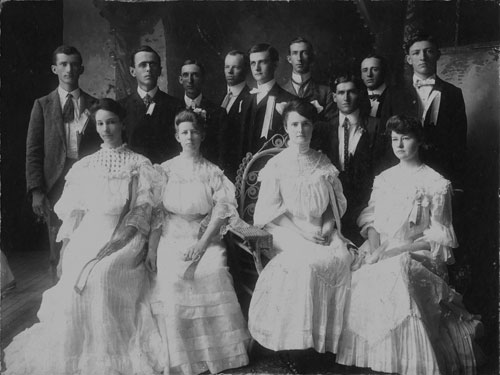
The East Texas Normal College graduating class of 1903. Rayburn is in the back row second from the right.

Rayburn went to co-educational East Texas Normal College (now East Texas A&M University) in Commerce, Texas, in 1900 with $25 (around $750 in 2020) that his father saved up to help take care of his first few months of college expenses. To help cover tuition and room and board, Rayburn rang the school bell to signal the end of classes and swept out Commerce's public school buildings, earning $3 a month. Rayburn obtained his teaching credentials before completing his bachelor of science degree, and earned additional income by teaching in the public school of Greenwood, a small community in Hopkins County. He graduated in 1903 in a class of 13 (9 men and 4 women) and taught school for two years.

== Texas State Legislature ==
In 1906, at the age of 24, Rayburn won by a narrow 163 vote margin an election to the 34th district of the Texas House of Representatives. While serving in the legislature, he studied at the University of Texas School of Law, and he was admitted to the bar in 1908.

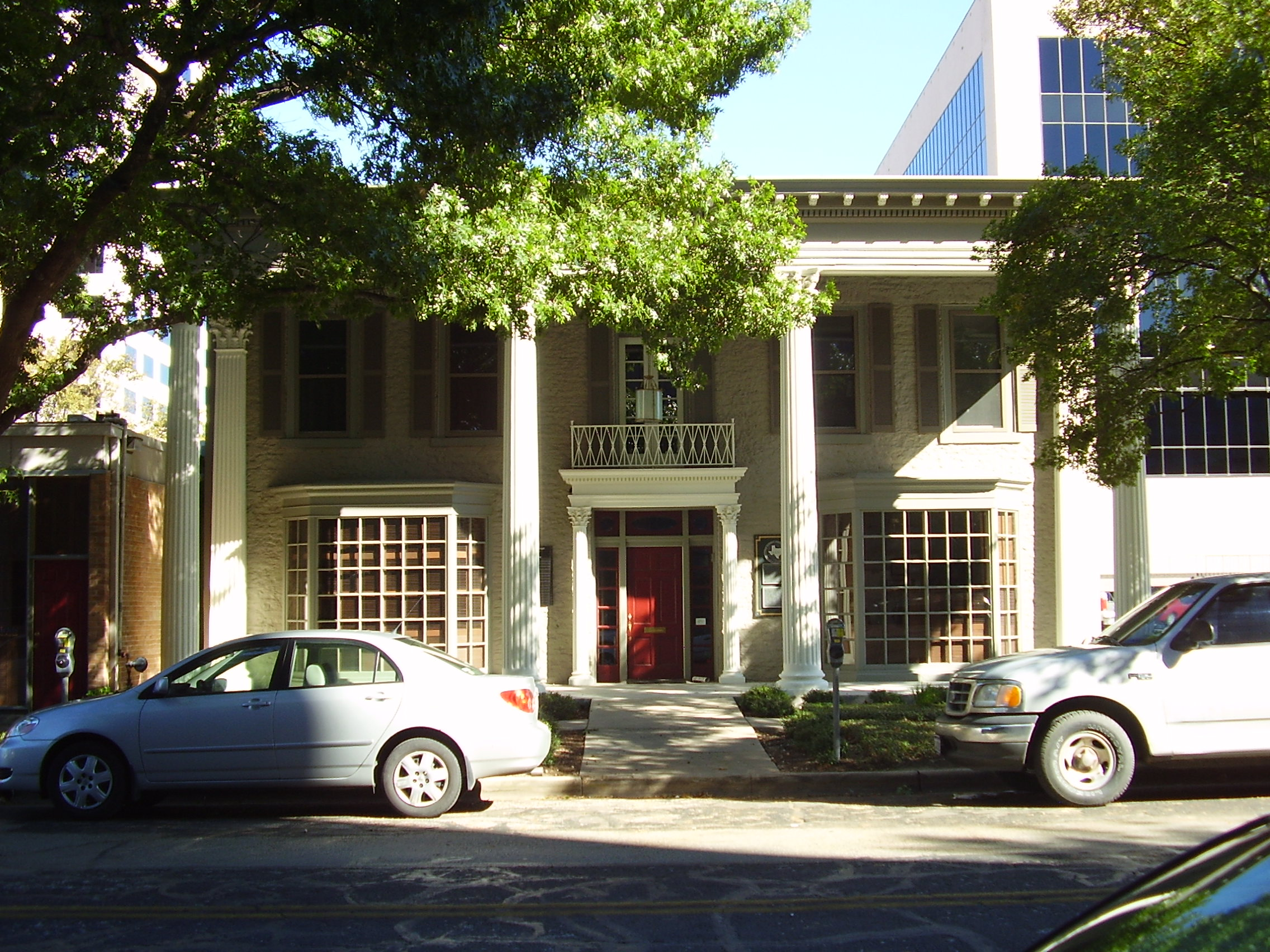
Rayburn lived at the Wahrenberger House from 1907 to 1908 when he served as a Texas Representative for the 34th district and studied at the University of Texas School of Law.

As a representative, Rayburn helped pass laws that made textbooks more widely available to Texas schoolchildren, established the State Board of Health alongside the Texas State Department of Health, and created the Texas Department of Agriculture. Due to his power of persuasion when he was a very young legislator for four years on January 10, 1911, at 29 years of age, Rayburn became the youngest Speaker of the Texas House of Representatives in history. He defeated Clarence E. Gilmore 70 to 63 in the speaker election. Texas speakers from the beginning of statehood until Rayburn's tenure were mostly ceremonial and powerless, similar to the president pro tempore of the U.S. Senate. Under Texas state law the office actually had immense powers but the previous speakers never exercised them due to deference to party bosses. Upon election as Speaker, Rayburn requested the appointment of a special committee to determine "the duties and rights of the speaker". This became the first ever codification of the speaker's power. He helped pass much legislation as Speaker, including shorter working hours for women, child labor laws, and appropriations for a Confederate widows’ home and a tuberculosis sanitarium. Many decades later Rayburn rated his service as Texas House Speaker as the most enjoyable period in his long political career. He said, "that job had real power—that's what a man wants—but power's no good unless you have the guts to use it."

== U.S. House of Representatives ==
Due to a series of lucky events for Rayburn, the House district of his home county of Fannin County, the fourth district, was open for him to run. Senator Joseph Weldon Bailey was rocked by allegations of corruption and bribery involving oil companies so he announced his resignation effective January 1913. The longtime incumbent representative of the fourth district, Choice B. Randell, ran for Bailey's open senate seat in the July 1912 primary election and lost. Rayburn won election to the House of Representatives in 1912 after a bruising Democratic primary where he won by only 490 votes. He won the general election afterwards and became a Representative. He entered Congress in 1913 at the beginning of Woodrow Wilson's presidency and served in office for almost 49 years (more than 24 terms), until the beginning of John F. Kennedy's presidency.

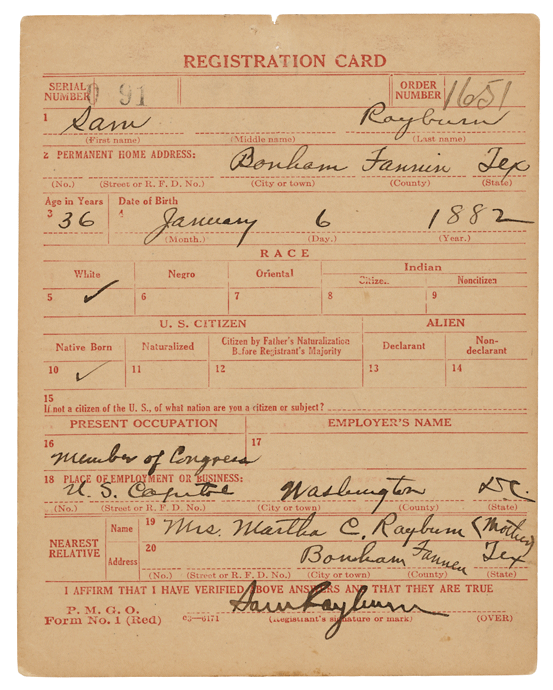
Rayburn's World War I draft registration card. In 1917 all 21- to 30-year-old men were required to register for the draft. In August 1918 it was expanded to 18- to 45-year-old men.

Rayburn was a protégé of then-Representative John Nance Garner. Despite Rayburn's freshman status, in 1913, Garner helped him become a member of the powerful House Interstate and Foreign Commerce Committee, which handled legislation pertaining to commerce, bridges, coal, oil, communication, motion pictures, securities exchanges, holding companies and the Coast Guard. Rayburn learned how to make deals and how to deal with adversity during his first two decades in the House. While he was a young representative he introduced and helped pass numerous anti-trust and railroad-related legislation such as the Clayton Antitrust Act of 1914, the Federal Trade Commission Act of 1914 and the Esch–Cummins Transportation Act (The Railway Stock and Bond Bill that was originally introduced in 1914 was the first ever major legislation that was crafted and proposed by Rayburn. In 1920 it finally became law in the Esch-Cummins Act).

As a signal of things to come for Rayburn, after only eight years in the House he was elected to be House Democratic Caucus Chairman. He served as chairman from 1921 to 1923. At only age 39 when he was elected chairman he was the youngest person ever elected to that position. During the 1920s, Rayburn kept a low profile due to the Republican dominance of Congress and the Presidency under Presidents Harding, Coolidge, and Hoover. Rayburn's biggest contribution in this decade was to help create the U.S. Highway System in 1926, the first major victory of his lifelong dream to make paved roads available for all Americans.

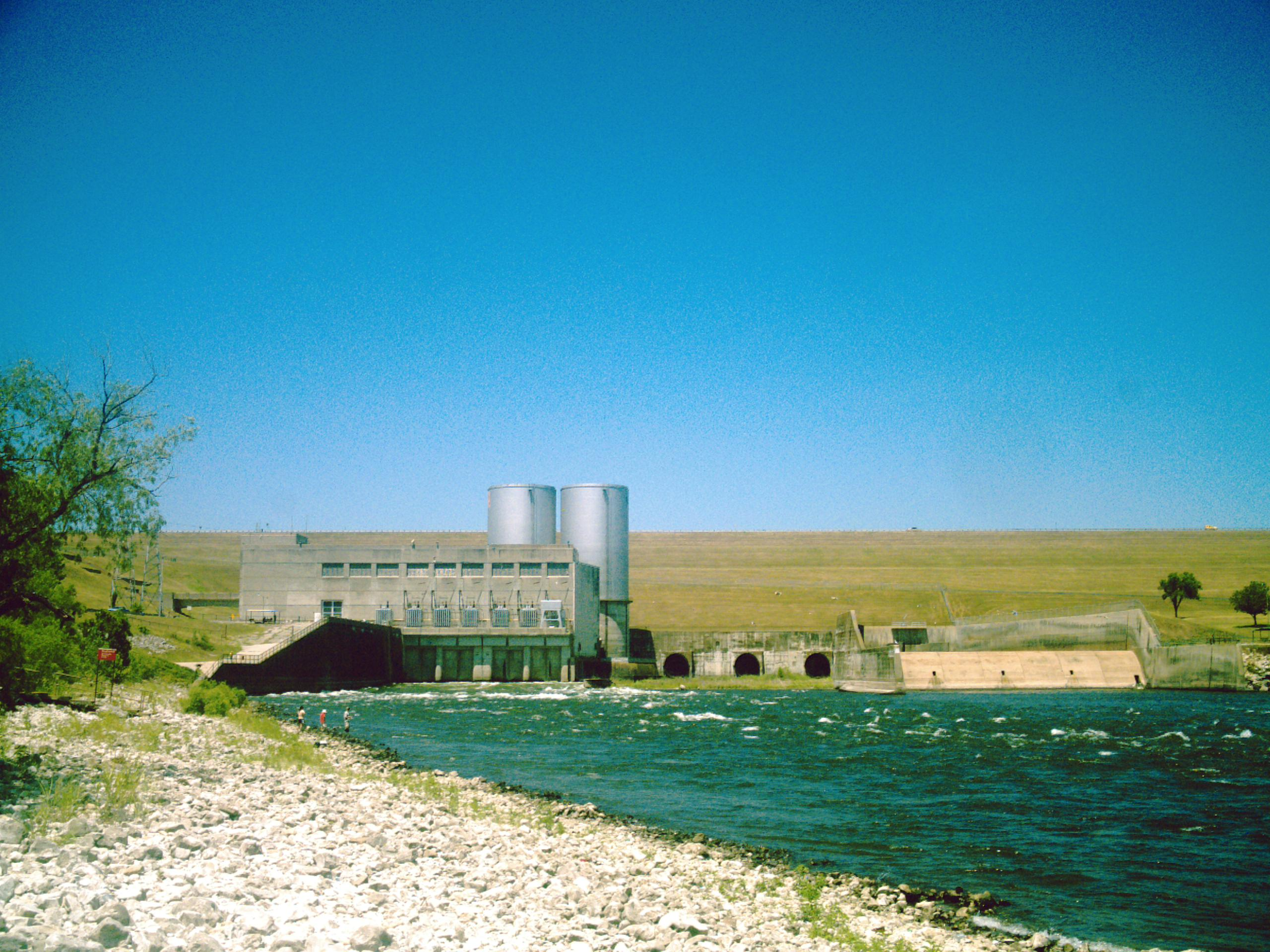
The Denison Dam located in Rayburn's House district was authorized by the Flood Control Act of 1938. The dam created Lake Texoma.

Rayburn worked as Garner's campaign manager during the 1932 presidential election and released Garner's delegates to vote for Roosevelt after a deal was made to make Garner the vice-presidential nominee.

From 1931 to 1937, Rayburn was Chairman of the House Interstate and Foreign Commerce Committee. Due to his position and influence on this committee he helped pass landmark New Deal bills such as the Truth in Securities Act, the bills that established the Securities and Exchange Commission and the Federal Communications Commission, the Public Utilities Holding Company Act, the Emergency Railroad Transportation Act, and the Rural Electrification Act.

Rayburn was a big supporter of projects that helped make life easier for farmers and rural Americans like dams and farm-to-market roads. His role in creating new lakes such as Lake Texoma and changing old rural dirt roads into fully paved roads ensured lifelong support from his congressional district constituents. The dams in rural America controlled rivers from flooding and also generated electricity. The Flood Control Act of 1936 combined with the Rural Electrification Act helped to bring electricity to 90% of rural America by 1959, compared to only 3% in the early 1930s. In 1943–44, Rayburn helped to establish in Texas, Oklahoma, Arkansas, Missouri, Kansas, and Louisiana the Southwestern Power Administration, which became a "mini-Tennessee Valley Authority" in the region. The main difference from the TVA was the SWPA only involved federal dams constructed by the U.S. Army Corps of Engineers. He also helped pass laws that established the Soil Conservation Service and the Civilian Conservation Corps. These two agencies were primarily engaged in water and soil erosion control due to the negative effects of farming in America that led to catastrophes like the Dust Bowl.

== Speaker of the House ==
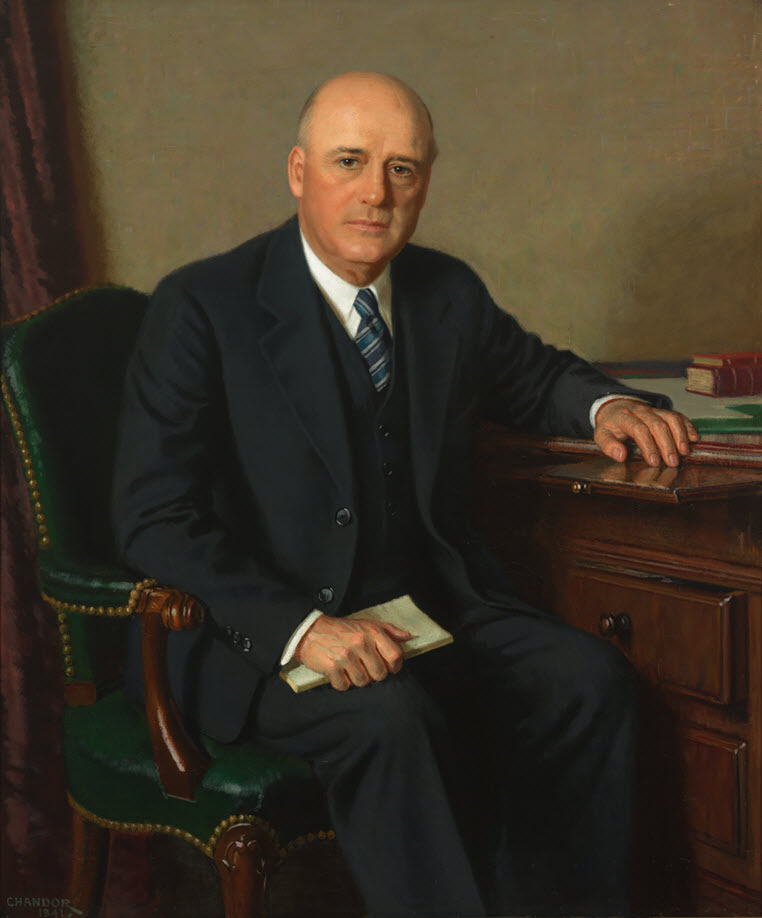
Portrait by Douglas Chandor, 1941

On September 16, 1940, at the age of 58, and while serving as House Majority Leader, Rayburn became Speaker of the House upon the sudden death of Speaker William Bankhead. Rayburn's ascension to the speakership was surprisingly rapid; that including Bankhead, the three Speakers prior to Rayburn died in office within six years. (Henry Thomas Rainey died in 1934 and Jo Byrns in 1936.)

Rayburn's first major crisis after assuming the speakership was World War II. In the decade prior to the war, the United States was isolationist and decided not to participate in the war when war broke out in 1937 in Asia and 1939 in Europe. Rayburn helped pass the Lend-Lease Act in March 1941. This act allowed the U.S. to distribute food, oil, and materiel to the United Kingdom, China, and the Soviet Union. In August 1941, he helped pass the Service Extension Act of 1941. In 1940, a 12-month peacetime draft was instituted by the government to prepare for possible war. But the isolationists in the House wanted to not get involved in the war and wanted to let the peacetime draft expire after 12 months in 1941. After Rayburn talked to all representatives who were anti-draft and tried to persuade them to change their minds, the bill was passed by a vote of 203–202, a one-vote margin. If this bill had been defeated, the U.S. Army stood to lose about two-thirds of its strength and three-fourths of the officer corps due to the end of the draft.

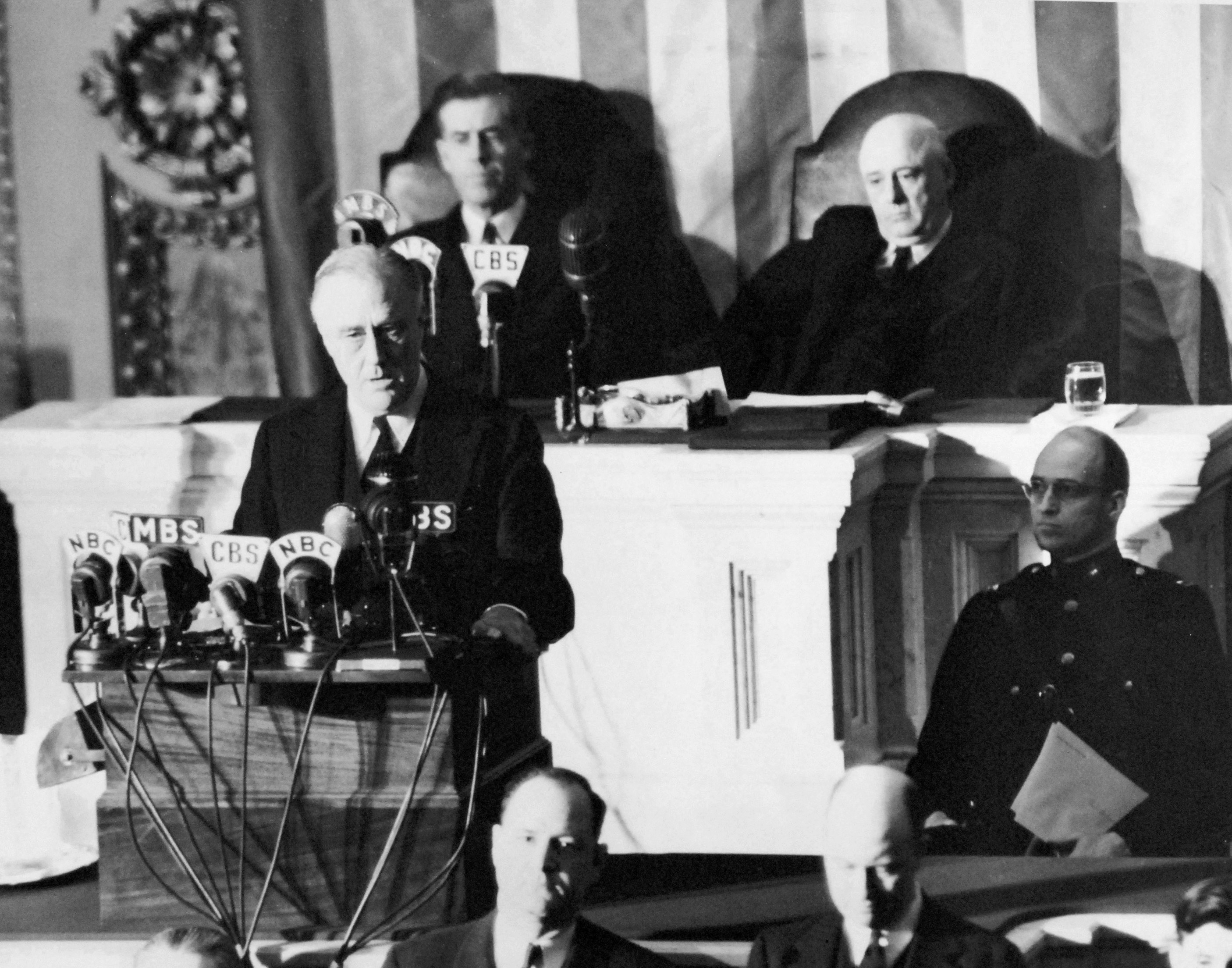
President Roosevelt delivers the Day of Infamy speech to Congress. Behind him are Vice President Henry A. Wallace (left) and Speaker Rayburn.

In early 1944, top Roosevelt officials approached Rayburn and asked him to work discreetly with Congress to gain funding for the production of an atomic bomb. Later that year, Rayburn secured $1.6 billion to fund the Manhattan Project, the code name for the secret project that led to the creation of the atomic bomb. This secret operation was done with most of the President's own cabinet, all of Congress save for a few members, and even the vice president not knowing about the atomic bomb. Only Rayburn, the Senate Majority Leader, and five other congressmen were aware of this operation. Rayburn had to hide the Manhattan Project through fake names and other deceptive means in appropriation bills until the bombs were used in 1945.

During the 1944 presidential campaign, President Roosevelt offered Speaker Rayburn the vice presidential nomination. Rayburn might have become president had he accepted Roosevelt's offer, but he rejected it. As the Speaker, Rayburn had already reached the pinnacle of his ambition. Ultimately, the Democratic vice presidential nomination went to Missouri Senator Harry S. Truman.

In 1946, the Republicans swept the Democrats in the midterm elections, winning both the House and Senate. The Democrats lost 54 seats in the House. Rayburn felt that because he lost in such an overwhelming manner he should step down as House Democratic Leader and not be the Minority Leader in the upcoming congress (this would have likely ended in an early retirement for him before the end of the 1940s). He endorsed the northern Democrat John W. McCormack for Minority Leader, but there was a "draft Rayburn" movement initiated by President Truman, McCormack himself, and all the northern and southern Democrats. Democrats feared that, without Rayburn as their leader, the Democratic Party would have been torn apart by inter-factionalism between northern and southern Democrats and liberal and conservative Democrats. Many people in Washington were then aware of how important Speaker Rayburn was to hold the Democratic Party together. Rayburn accepted the Minority Leader position and remained the House Democratic Leader for the rest of his life. To show how much they appreciated Rayburn's decision to stay in office as House Democratic Leader, 142 House Democrats and 50 House Republicans surprised Rayburn with a special gift, a 1947 Cadillac. The House Speaker was provided a government-funded vehicle and the representatives felt bad that now Minority Leader Rayburn would have no car in Washington. Rayburn had a strict personal rule to never accept gifts more than $25 to avoid being bribed. The congressmembers circumvented this rule by combining their single $25 checks together to pay for the car. Rayburn returned all 50 Republican representatives' checks (to avoid a conflict of interest) but graciously thanked them for their gesture.

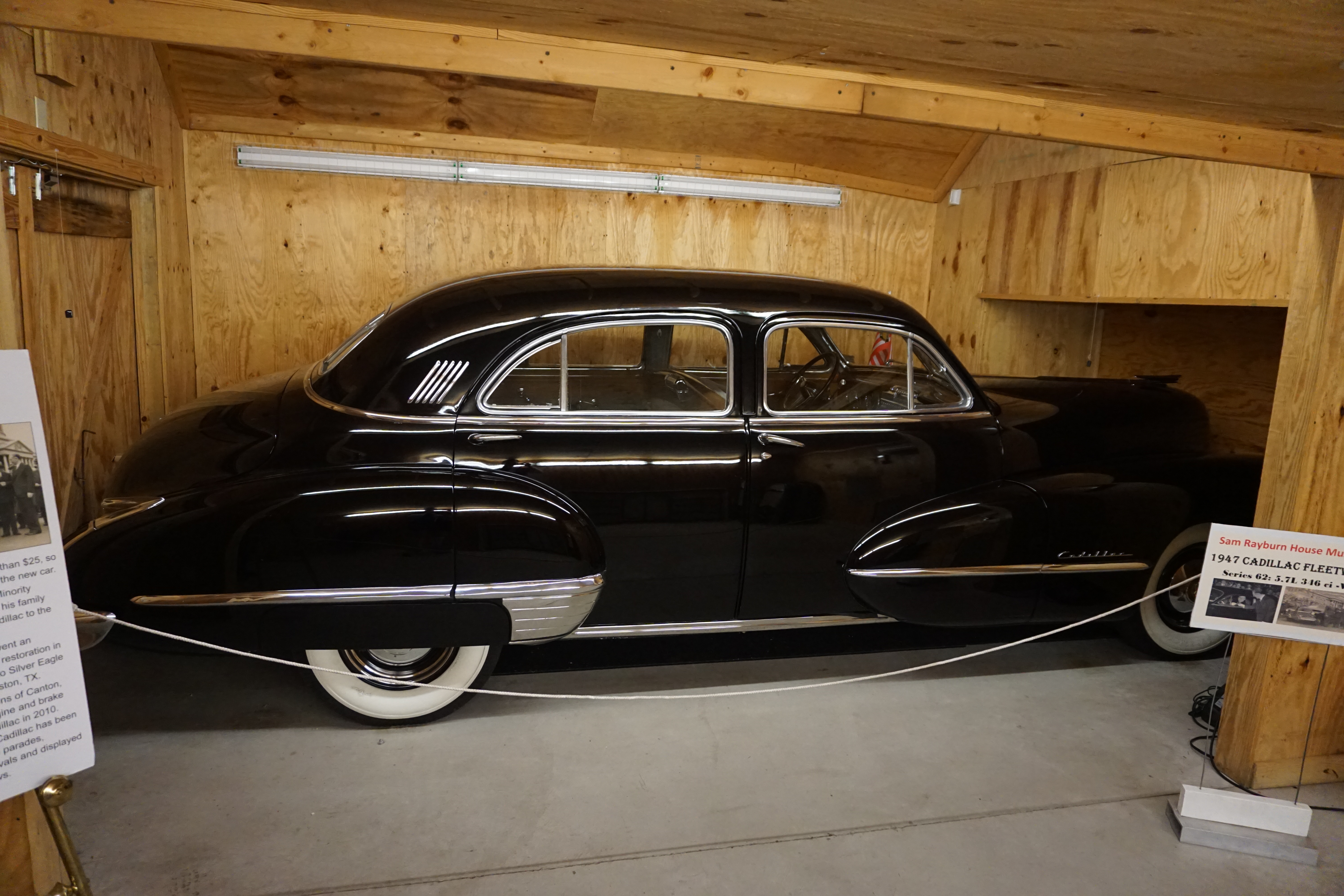
This 1947 Cadillac Fleetwood Series 62 was a gift from the House Democrats and House Republicans after he became Minority Leader. 142 Democratic congressmembers and 50 Republican congressmembers donated $25 each to purchase this car.

In 1947–1948, Rayburn as Minority Leader helped pass the Marshall Plan and the aid package that supported the Truman Doctrine that supported non-communist European countries and helped to stop the spread of communism. He also had to deal with the southern Democrats' (Dixiecrats') reaction to President Truman's call for very swift civil rights legislation. The committees were dominated by very powerful southern Democrats who were pro-segregation so these civil rights bills were dead on arrival. Rayburn had to be the moderate between the conservatives and liberals as well as the northern and southern Democrats so he rebuffed Truman's civil rights bills that many party members considered very fast but also rejected the southern Democrats' calls for a pro-segregation candidate to run in place of Truman in the 1948 presidential election. Rayburn was against a swift poll tax repeal and other fast-track civil rights legislation but also ordered the pro-segregation Democrats to run as a third-party due to his fears that the northern Democrats would boycott the election and help the Republicans win the election. Rayburn was a staunch supporter of Truman and was for a gradual civil rights legislation rollout that wouldn't be too fast and immediate due to the fears of the backlash by southern Democrats. In 1949, after his successful efforts to win back the House, Senate, and Truman's re-election he became Speaker again and supported a repeal of the Texas poll tax. He said that a repeal of the poll tax in Texas would aid the United States in its battle with the Soviet Union for the world's hearts and minds.

From 1949 to 1953, Rayburn was Speaker again. He supported Truman's Fair Deal but the Conservative Coalition of conservative Republicans and conservative Democrats blocked the Fair Deal legislation from being passed. During his second tenure as Speaker he focused mostly on passing anti-Soviet legislation and getting House support for Truman and the military in the Korean War. By 1952 the Korean War bogged down and Truman's popularity crashed. He chose not to run for re-election as a result and the Republicans won the House, Senate, and presidency.

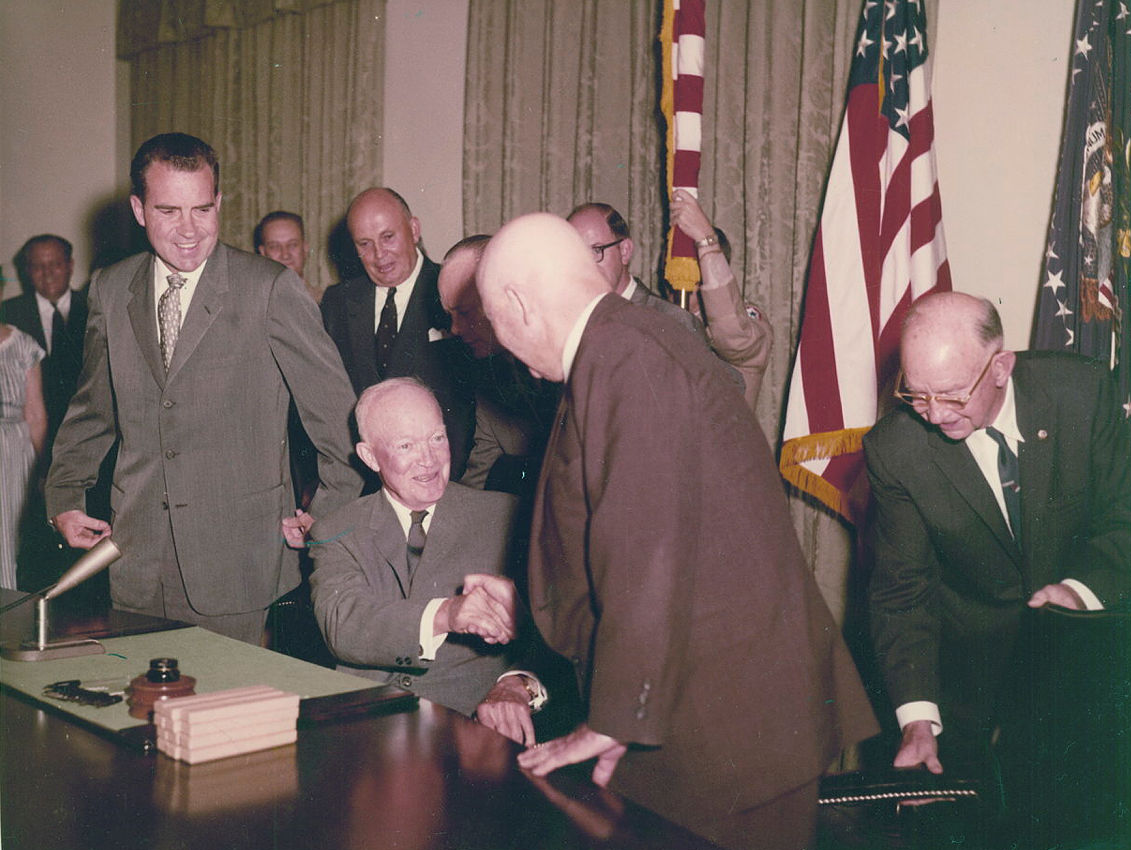
Rayburn and President Eisenhower shaking hands at the signing ceremony for the Alaska Statehood Act

Rayburn's second time as Minority Leader coincided with President Eisenhower's first two years of his presidency. McCarthyism was in full swing so both parties were trying their best to portray themselves as anti-communist. The Communist Control Act of 1954 and the continuing defense of South Korea and Taiwan and South Vietnam were supported by Rayburn and most Democrats. Rayburn and the Democrats won back the House and Senate in the 1954 elections.

Rayburn's third and final tenure as Speaker from 1955 to 1961 was one of the greatest moments of his career. His protégé Senator Lyndon B. Johnson became Majority Leader mostly thanks to Rayburn maneuvering the Senate leadership and making deals to make sure Johnson became Senate Democratic Leader. The trio of Rayburn, Eisenhower, and Johnson worked together well and passed numerous landmark bills such as the National Interstate and Defense Highways Act that established the Interstate Highway System, the National Aeronautics and Space Act that established NASA, the Federal Aviation Act of 1958 that established the FAA, the National Defense Education Act, the Colorado River Storage Project Act, the Civil Rights Act of 1957 and the Civil Rights Act of 1960, which were the first civil rights acts passed since Reconstruction.

Rayburn swears in Lyndon B. Johnson as Vice President on January 20, 1961 (1:19)

In 1958–1959, Rayburn helped admit Alaska and Hawaii into the United States as the 49th and 50th states. Rayburn heavily fought for Alaska after realizing that then-Democratic Alaska would counter then-Republican Hawaii in the Senate and Electoral College. In 1961, Rayburn wanted to pass more civil rights legislation along with President Kennedy but the powerful House Rules Committee was dominated by a conservative coalition of Democrats and Republicans who rejected any socially liberal legislation. Rayburn sought to end the impasse by changing House rules to add three spots (two majority and one minority) to the committee. Rayburn defended his plan in a rare speech on the House floor. "I think this House should be allowed on great measures to work its will and it cannot work its will if the Committee on Rules is so constituted as not to allow the House to pass on those things." In a 217–212 vote, Rayburn and the Democratic leadership won a narrow but significant victory.

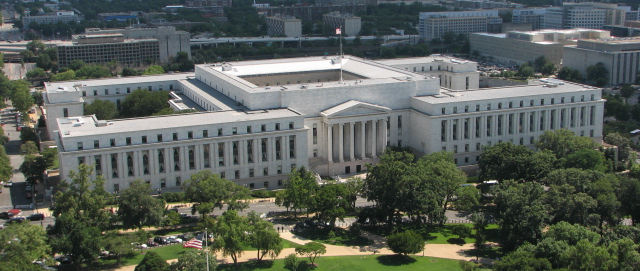
Rayburn's influence and great rapport with congressmembers and the Washington bureaucracy allowed the Rayburn House Office Building to be designed and built within 10 years. At 2.4 million square feet, it is larger than the next two largest Capitol office buildings combined.

Himself a protégé of Vice President of the United States John Nance Garner, Rayburn was a close friend and mentor of Lyndon B. Johnson and knew Johnson's father, Sam, from their days in the Texas Legislature. Rayburn was instrumental to Lyndon Johnson's ascent to power, particularly his rapid rise to the position of Minority Leader. Johnson had been in the Senate for a mere four years when he assumed the role. Johnson also owed his subsequent elevation to Majority Leader to Rayburn. Like Johnson, Rayburn did not sign the Southern Manifesto.

As Speaker of the House, Rayburn forged close friendships and partnerships with legislatures of emerging independent countries and democracies on the continent of Africa, especially Nigeria, a rising political power on that continent. Rayburn was a good friend of Jaja Wachuku, the first indigenous Speaker of the Nigerian House of Representatives, from 1959 to 1960.

=== Personal integrity ===
Although many Texas legislators were on the payroll of public service corporations, Rayburn refused to be. As he recounted in a speech during his congressional campaign:

When I became a member of the law firm of Steger, Thurmond and Rayburn, Messrs. Thurmond and Steger were representing the Santa Fe Railroad Company, receiving pay monthly. When the first check came after I entered the firm, Mr. Thurmond brought to my desk one-third of the amount of the check, explaining what it was for. I said to him that I was a member of the Legislature, representing the people of Fannin County, and that my experience had taught me that men who represent the people should be as far removed as possible from concerns whose interests he was liable to be called on to legislate concerning, and that on that ground I would not accept a dollar of the railroad's money, though I was legally entitled to it. I never did take a dollar of it. I have been guided by the principle in all my dealings.

This practice of refusing to accept fees from clients with interests before the legislature was "virtually unheard-of" at the time. Later, while serving in Congress, a wealthy oil man had a very expensive horse delivered to Rayburn's farm in Bonham. No one apparently knew the oil man delivered the horse except him, Rayburn, and a Rayburn staffer. Rayburn returned the horse.

H.G. Dulaney, an aide to Rayburn and later the director of the Sam Rayburn Library and Museum, said that after speaking in Texas on one occasion Rayburn learned his driver had been given an envelope with money inside from the sponsor of the speech. He said Rayburn made the driver turn around and return the money. Author Robert Caro said, "No one could buy him. Lobbyists could not buy him so much as a meal. Not even the taxpayer could buy him a meal. He refused not only fees but travel expenses for out-of-town speeches; hosts who... attempted to press checks upon him quickly realized they had made a mistake... Rayburn would say, 'I'm not for sale' - and then he would walk away without a backward glance."

=== Legacy ===
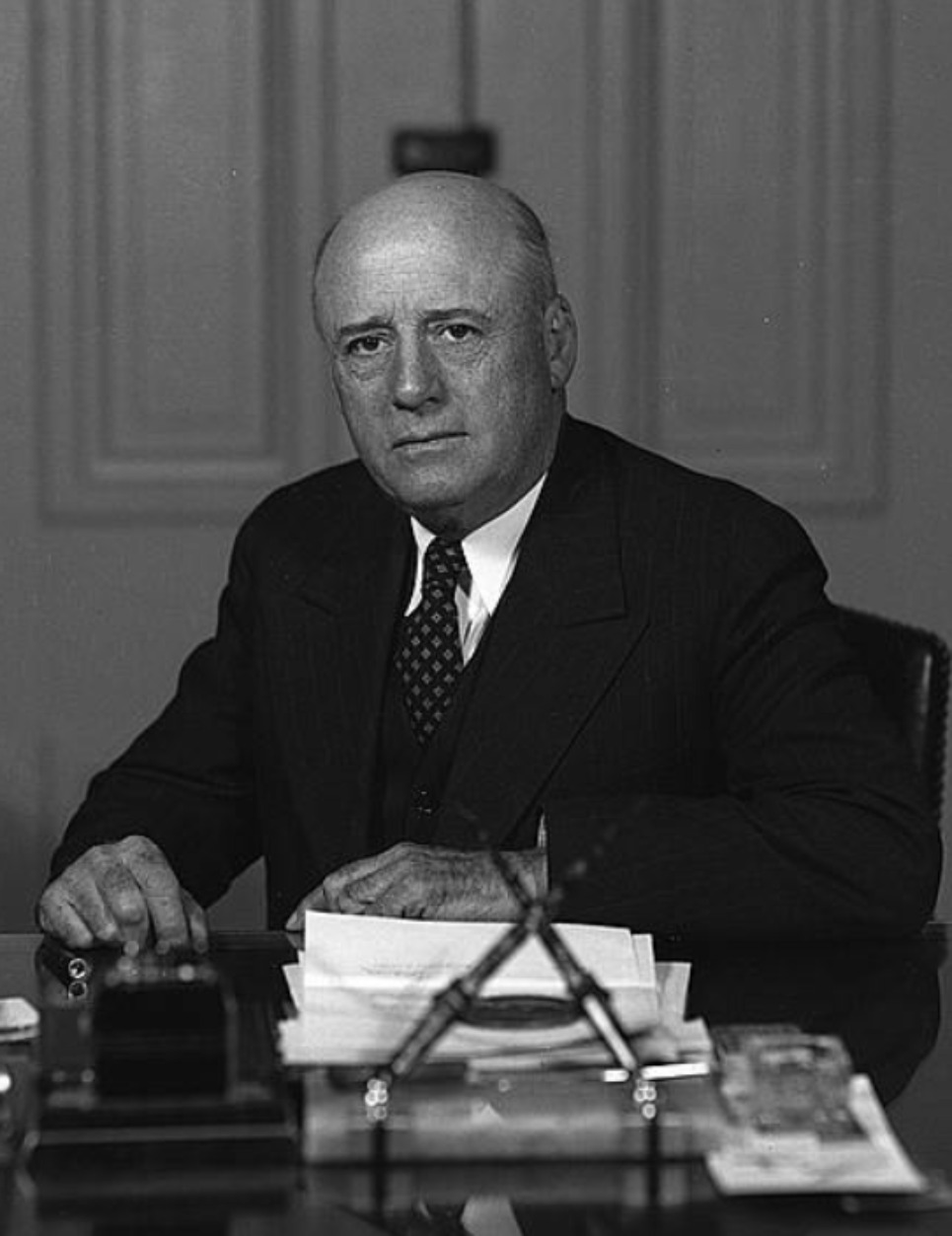
Sam Rayburn

In shaping legislation, Rayburn preferred working quietly in the background to being in the public spotlight. As Speaker, he won a reputation for fairness and integrity. In his years in Congress, Rayburn always insisted on paying his own expenses, even going so far as to pay for his own travel expenses when inspecting the Panama Canal when his committee was considering legislation concerning it, rather than exercising his right to have the government pay for it. After he died his estate was valued at just under $300,000 (over 3 million, adjusted for 2026 inflation), which was mostly land he owned, and the amount of cash he had in various checking accounts was just over $26,000.

Rayburn was well known among his colleagues for his after business hours "Board of Education" meetings in hideaway offices in the House. During these off-the-record sessions, the speaker and powerful committee chairmen would gather for poker, bourbon, and a frank discussion of politics. Rayburn alone determined who received an invitation to these gatherings; to be invited to even one was a high honor. On April 12, 1945, Vice President Harry Truman, a regular attendee since his Senate days, had just arrived at the "Board of Education" when he received a phone call telling him to immediately come to the White House, where he learned that Franklin D. Roosevelt was dead and he was now President of the United States.

Rayburn coined the term "Sun Belt" while strongly supporting the construction of Route 66. It originally ran south from Chicago, through Oklahoma, and then turned westward from Texas to New Mexico and Arizona before ending at the beach in Santa Monica, California. Arguing in favor of the project, he stated famously that America absolutely must connect "the Frost Belt with the Sun Belt".

Rayburn also had a knack for dressing to suit his occasion. While in Washington, D.C., he would sport expensive suits, starched shirts, and perfectly shined shoes. However, while back in his poorer district in Texas, Rayburn would wear simple shirts, blue jeans, cowboy boots, and cowboy hats. Several politicians have imitated this pattern, including Ronald Reagan's example of clearing brush when at home in California, while wearing fine suits in Washington.

The phrase "A jackass can kick a barn down, but it takes a carpenter to build one" is attributed to Rayburn.

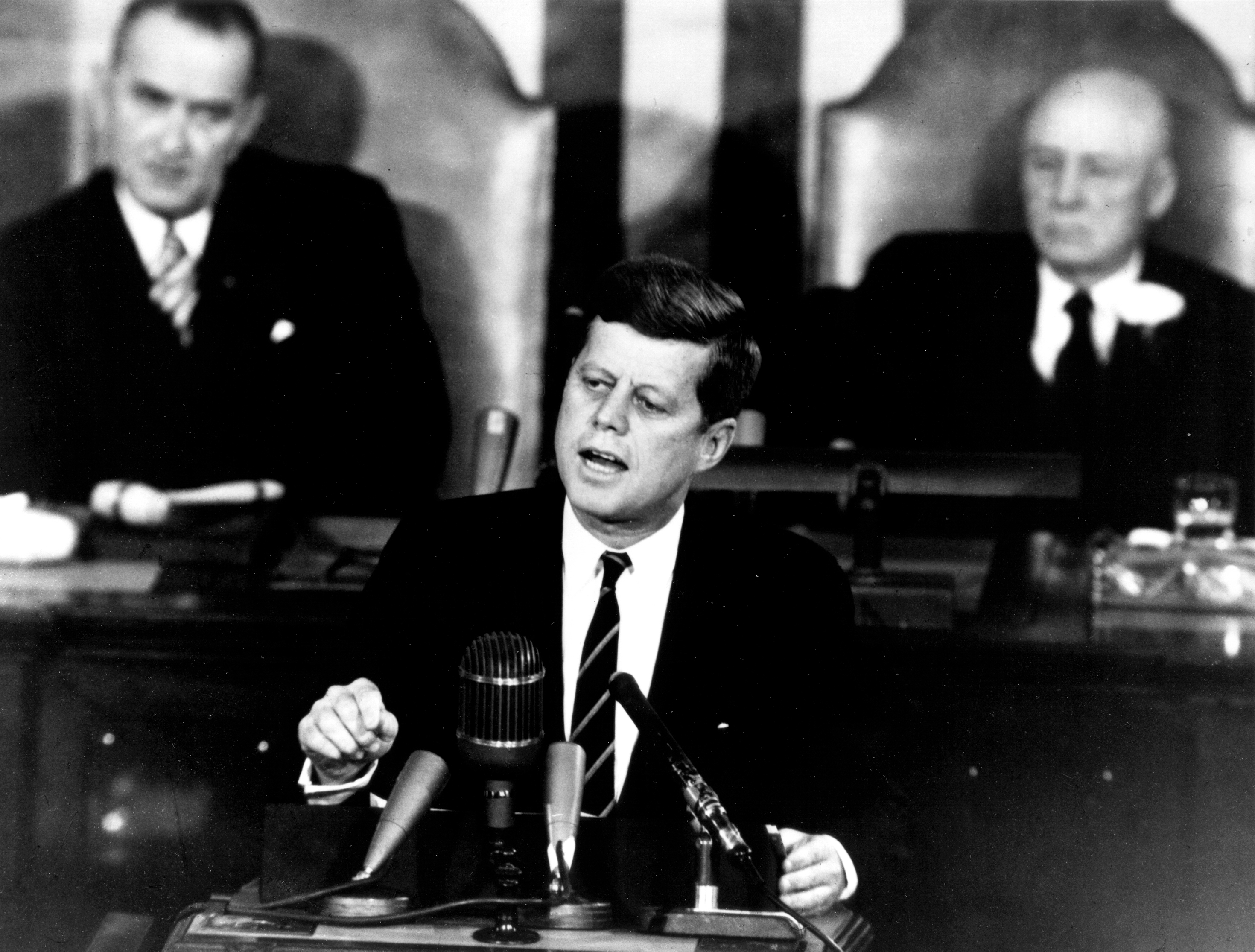
Speaker Rayburn is seated at right behind President John F. Kennedy in this May 25, 1961, photograph showing Kennedy announcing the Apollo program.

His home in Texas, now known as the Sam Rayburn House Museum, was designated a U.S. National Historic Landmark. In 1957, Rayburn dedicated the Sam Rayburn Library and Museum in Bonham in the style of a presidential library to preserve his memory, library collection, honors, and mementos.

== Personal life and death ==
External videos
- Interview with Donald Bacon on Rayburn: A Biography, December 14, 1987, C-SPAN

Rayburn married once, to Metze Jones (1901–1982), sister of Texas Congressman and Rayburn friend Marvin Jones. He had corresponded with her for nine years, and at the time of the wedding Rayburn was 45 and Jones was 26. Their 1927 marriage ended after only a few months; biographers D. B. Hardeman and Donald C. Bacon guessed that Rayburn's work schedule and long bachelorhood, combined with the couple's differing views on alcohol, contributed to the rift. The court's divorce file in Bonham, Texas, has never been located, and Rayburn avoided speaking of his brief marriage. In 2014, the Associated Press reported the existence of a letter Rayburn wrote to Metze after her father died in June 1926.

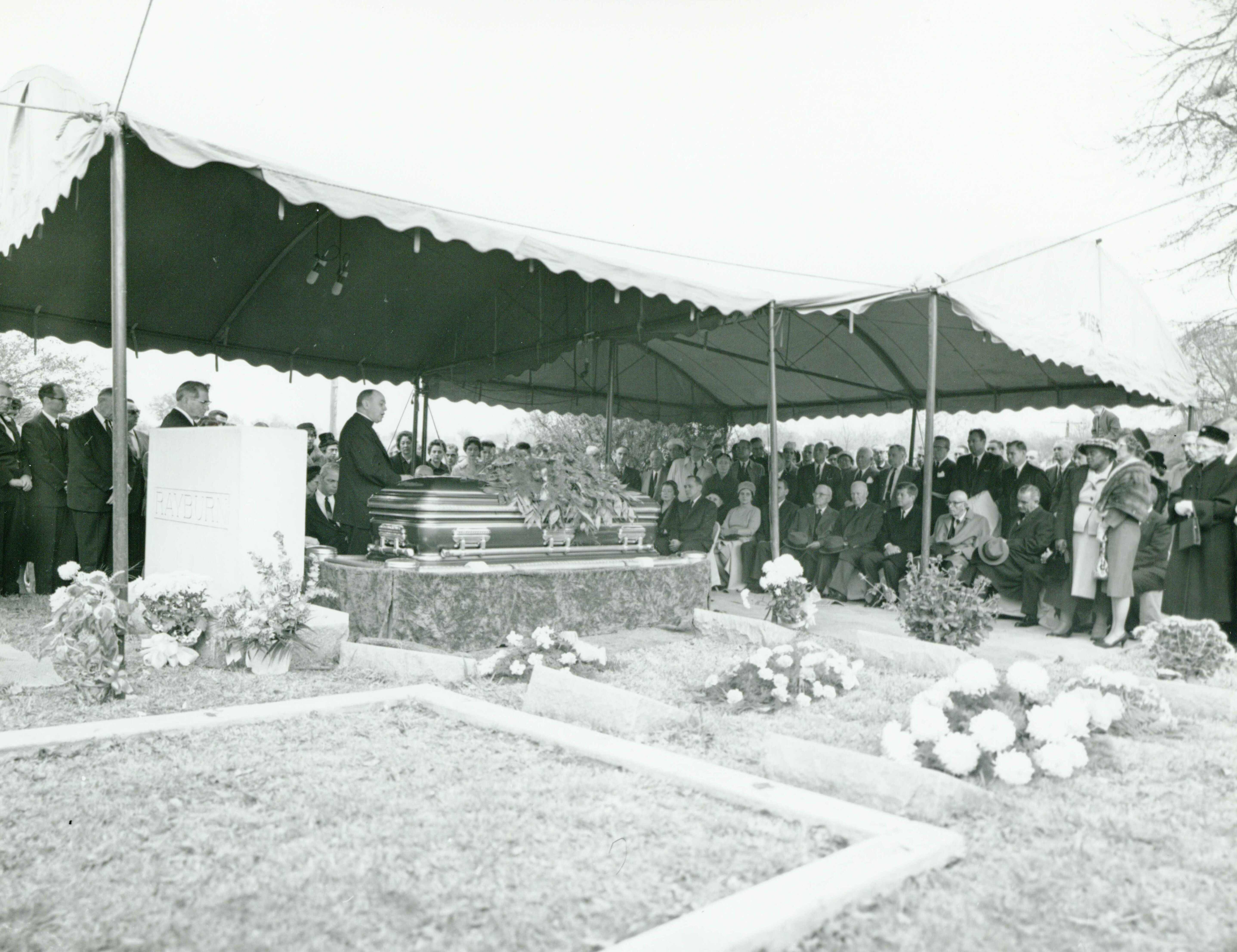
Funeral service for Sam Rayburn in Bonham, Texas. Seated in the front row from left to right are former presidents Truman and Eisenhower, President Kennedy, and vice president (and future president) Johnson.

In 2016, the Plano Star Courier published a story about an article in the October 2016 issue of Southwestern Historical Quarterly (a scholarly journal published by the Texas State Historical Association) profiling Sam Rayburn's "lady friend" who was a woman named Margaret Fallon (Peggy) Palmer, the widow of former Attorney General A. Mitchell Palmer, and her close relationship with Rayburn.

In 1956, Rayburn was baptized by Elder H. G. Ball in the Primitive Baptist Church, also known as Old Line Baptist or Hard Shell Baptist Church.

One of his greatest, most painful regrets was that he did not have a son, or as he was quoted as saying in The Path to Power, Robert Caro's biography of Lyndon B. Johnson, "a towheaded boy to take fishing".

Rayburn died of pancreatic cancer in 1961 at the age of 79 and was posthumously awarded the Congressional Gold Medal. His funeral in Bonham, Texas was a large spectacle attended by numerous VIPs, most notably President John F. Kennedy, former presidents Harry S. Truman and Dwight Eisenhower, and vice president (and future president) Lyndon B. Johnson. Hundreds of members of Congress and numerous other dignitaries attended the funeral. President Kennedy was an honorary pallbearer. By the time of his death, he had served as Speaker for nearly twice as long as any of his predecessors.

Sam Rayburn was close friends with the wood shop instructor Prof. Tarter of East Texas State Teachers College in Commerce, Texas (now East Texas A&M University) and had his own room in the family's house during his visits to the district. This house still stands at 1910 Monroe St., Commerce, TX.

Rayburn was a descendant of George Waller, a Revolutionary War militia officer from Henry County, Virginia, and was an honorary president of the Colonel George Waller Chapter of the Sons of the American Revolution.

== Tributes ==
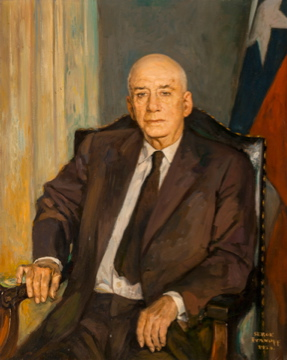
Portrait of Sam Rayburn by Serge Ivanoff, 1958

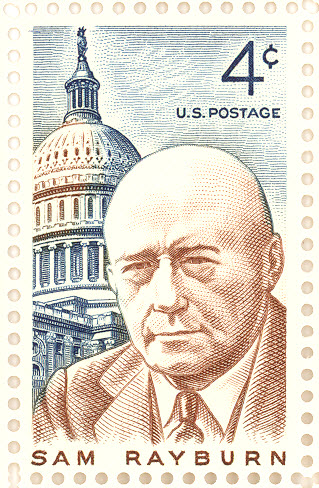
A stamp issued by the United States Post Office Department

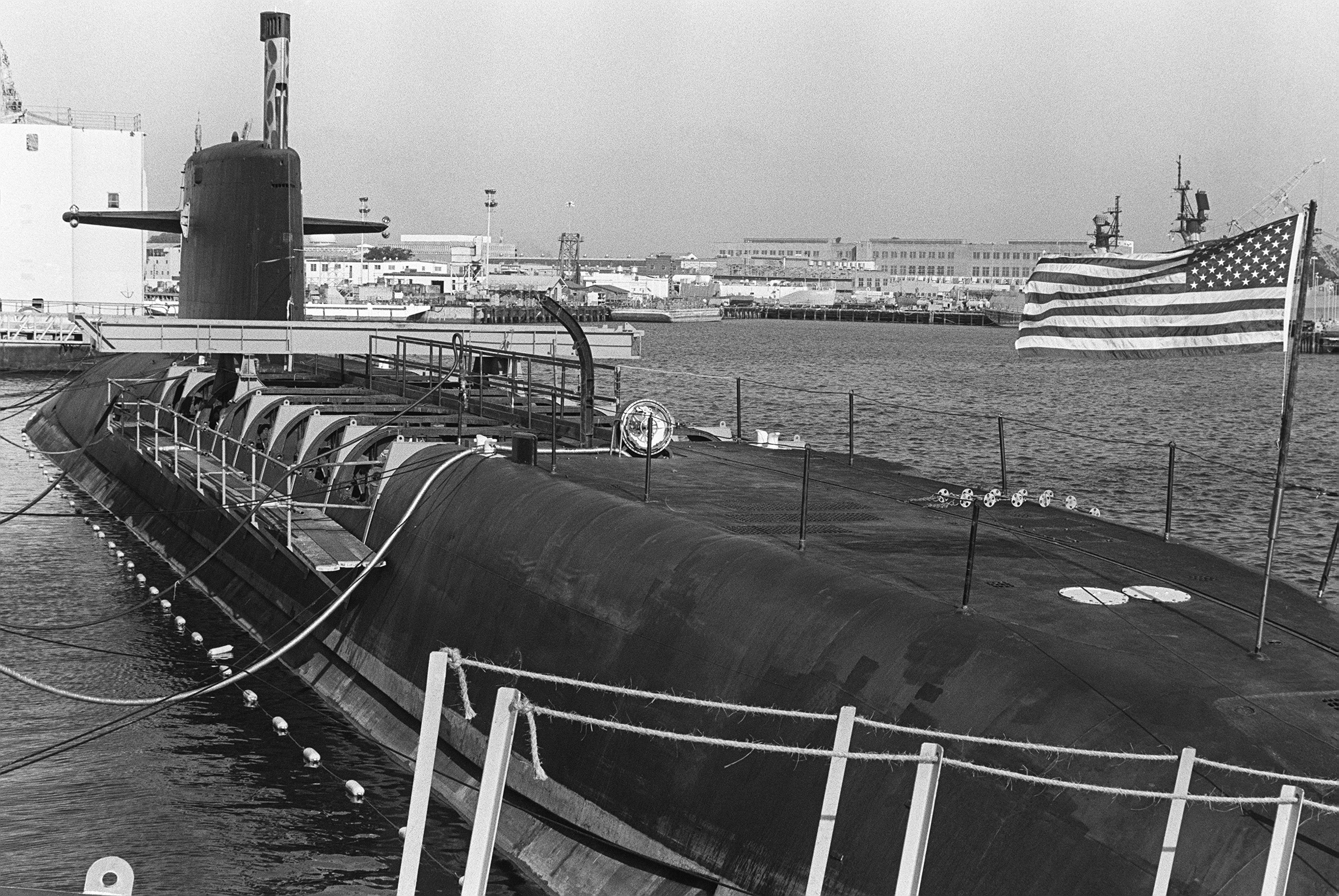
Nuclear ballistic missile submarine USS Sam Rayburn

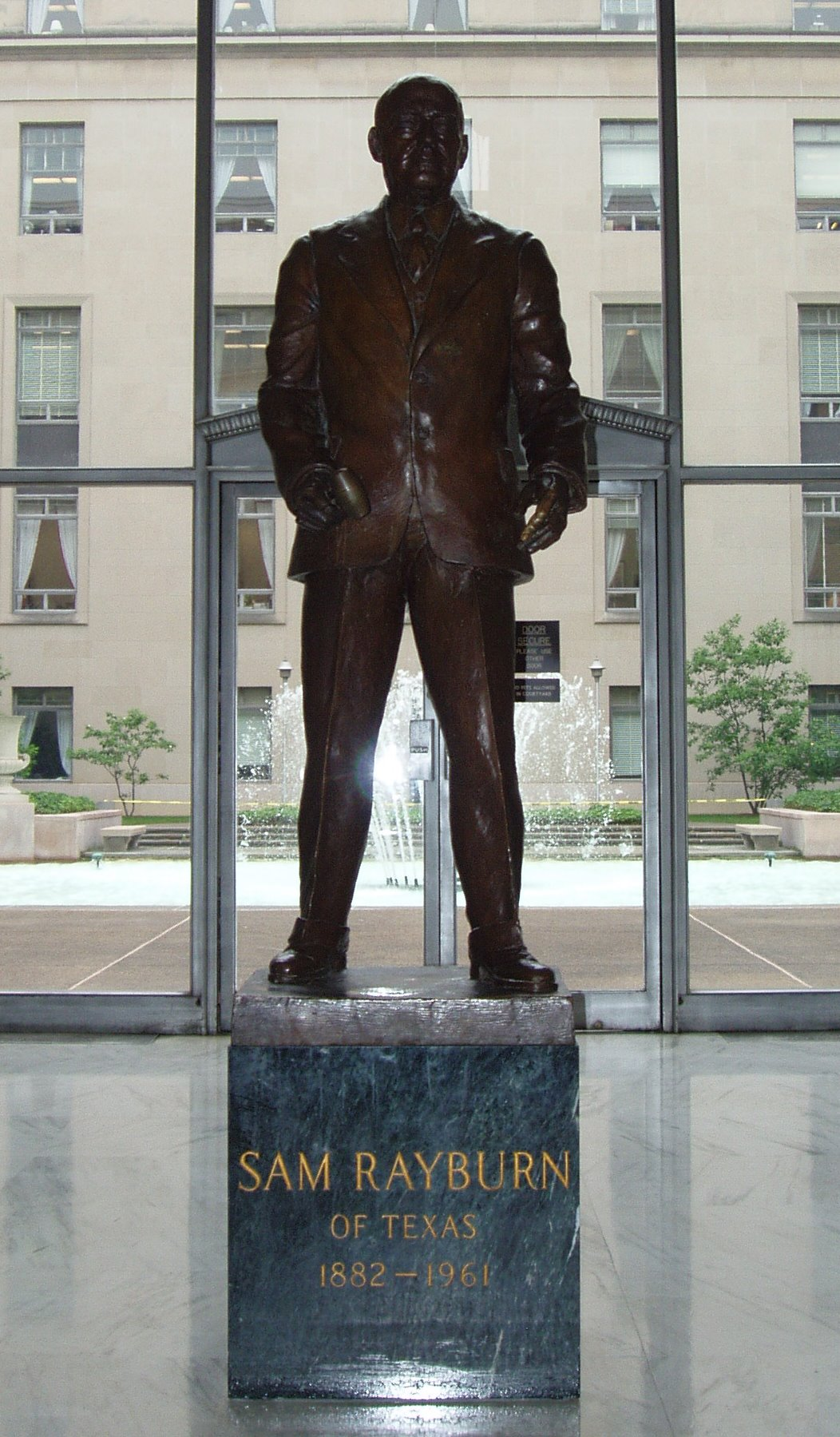
A statue of Rayburn in the Rayburn House Office Building

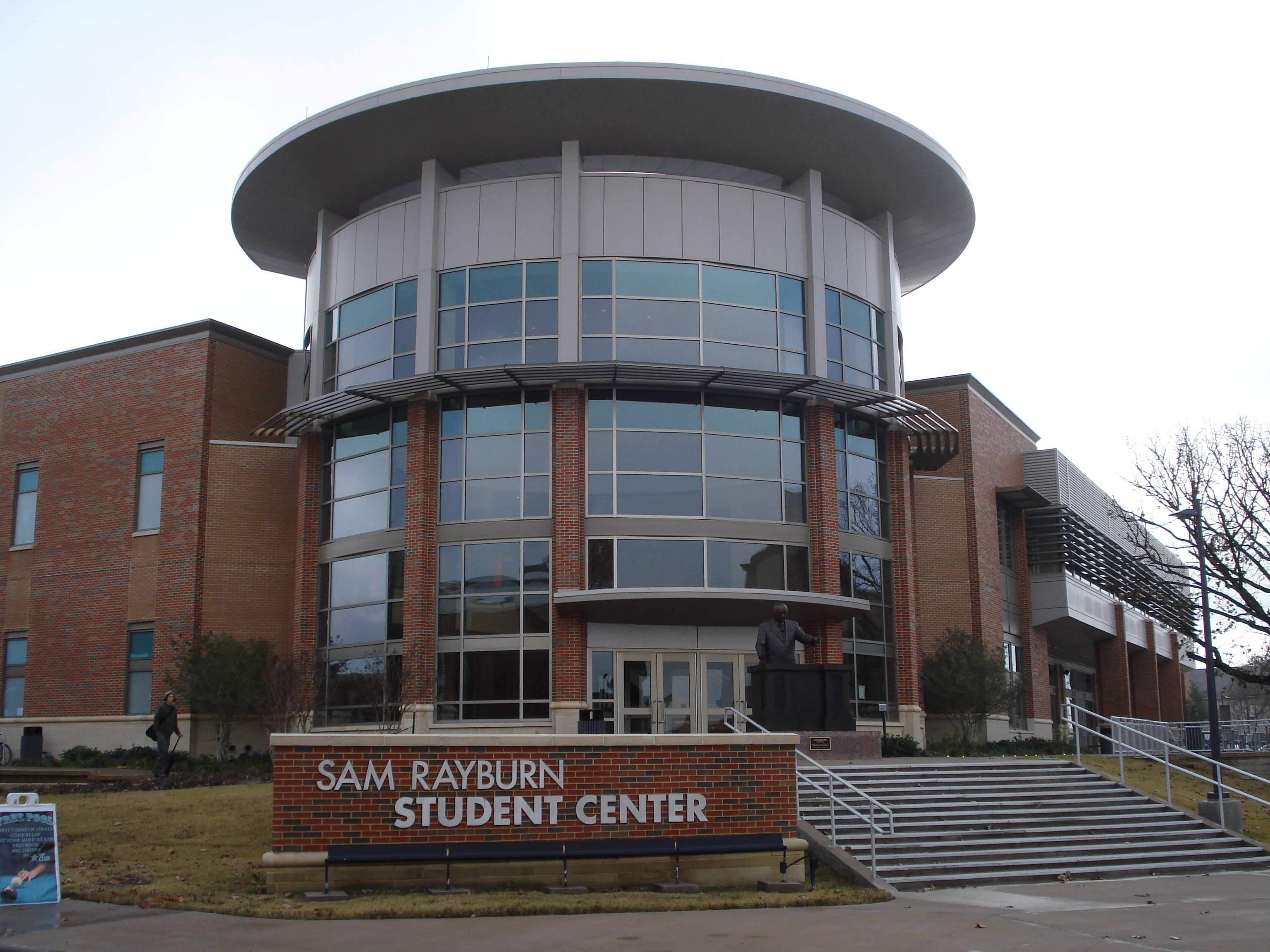
A statue of Rayburn in front of the Sam Rayburn Student Center (opened in 2009) at East Texas A&M University

The Sam Rayburn Library and Museum in Bonham, Texas

=== Named in his honor ===
- Rayburn House Office Building, which contains offices of House members and is adjacent to the United States Capitol, completed in 1965.
- Nuclear ballistic missile submarine USS Sam Rayburn, launched in 1963 and decommissioned in 1989.
- Sam Rayburn Reservoir in East Texas, constructed beginning in 1956 and renamed after Rayburn in 1963.
  - Sam Rayburn, Texas, a census-designated place and unincorporated community named after the reservoir.
- Sam Rayburn High School in Pasadena, Texas, opened in 1964.
- Sam Rayburn Independent School District in Ivanhoe, Texas, established in 1964.
- Sam Rayburn Memorial Student Center at East Texas A&M University, built in 1963. New Sam Rayburn Student Center replaced the old center, built in 2009.
- Sam Rayburn Intermediate School in Bryan, Texas.
- Sam Rayburn Middle School in San Antonio, Texas.
- Sam Rayburn Freeway is a portion of U.S. Highway 75 that runs through Sherman, Texas.
- Sam Rayburn Tollway is a toll road in the Dallas-Fort Worth Metroplex that goes through Dallas, Denton, and Collin counties in northeast Texas.
- Sam Rayburn Memorial Highway, roughly a forty-mile section of Texas State Highway 121 that begins at Texas State Highway 78, two miles north of Bonham, Texas, and ends at its terminus with the Sam Rayburn Tollway in McKinney, Texas.
- Sam Rayburn Elementary School in McAllen, Texas.
- Sam Rayburn Elementary School in Grand Prairie, Texas.
- Sam Rayburn Memorial Veterans Center in Bonham, Texas.
- The Rayburn Room, a meeting room at The Greenbrier in White Sulphur Springs, West Virginia. The Greenbrier contains the Bunker
- Sam Rayburn Drive is a portion of Texas State Highway 56 that runs through Bonham, Texas.
- The Rayburn Room, a large reception room at the United States Capitol where congressmembers can meet with press or receive constituents. It also serves as a holding room for visiting officials attending joint sessions of Congress.
- Sam Rayburn power station in Nursery, Texas.

== Portrayals ==
Pat Hingle played Rayburn in the 1987 made-for-television movie LBJ: The Early Years. James Gammon played him in the 1995 HBO movie Truman.

== See also ==
- List of Freemasons
- Wahrenberger House
- List of members of the United States Congress who died in office (1950–1999)

Texas House of Representatives
Preceded by Rosser Thomas	Member of the Texas House of Representatives from District 34 (Bonham); 1907–1913	Succeeded by Robert R. Williams
Preceded by John Wesley Marshall	Speaker of the Texas House of Representatives; 1911–1913	Succeeded by Chester H. Terrell
U.S. House of Representatives
Preceded by Choice B. Randell	Member of the U.S. House of Representatives from Texas's 4th congressional district March 4, 1913 – November 16, 1961	Succeeded by Ray Roberts
Preceded by William B. Bankhead	Majority Leader of the U.S. House of Representatives; 1937–1940	Succeeded by John W. McCormack
Preceded by William B. Bankhead	Speaker of the U.S. House of Representatives; September 16, 1940 – January 3, 1947	Succeeded by Joseph W. Martin Jr.
Preceded by Joseph W. Martin Jr.	Speaker of the U.S. House of Representatives; January 3, 1949 – January 3, 1953	Succeeded by Joseph W. Martin Jr.
Preceded by Joseph W. Martin Jr.	Speaker of the U.S. House of Representatives; January 5, 1955 – November 16, 1961	Succeeded by John W. McCormack
Party political offices
Preceded by Arthur G. DeWalt	Democratic Caucus Chairman of the U.S. House of Representatives; 1923–1925	Succeeded by Henry T. Rainey
Preceded by Samuel D. Jackson	Permanent Chairman of the Democratic National Convention; 1948, 1952, 1956	Succeeded by John W. McCormack
Honorary titles
Preceded by Robert L. Doughton	Dean of the U.S. House of Representatives; January 5, 1953 – November 16, 1961	Succeeded by Carl Vinson
