= History of East Texas Normal College =

Early history of Texas A&M University–Commerce

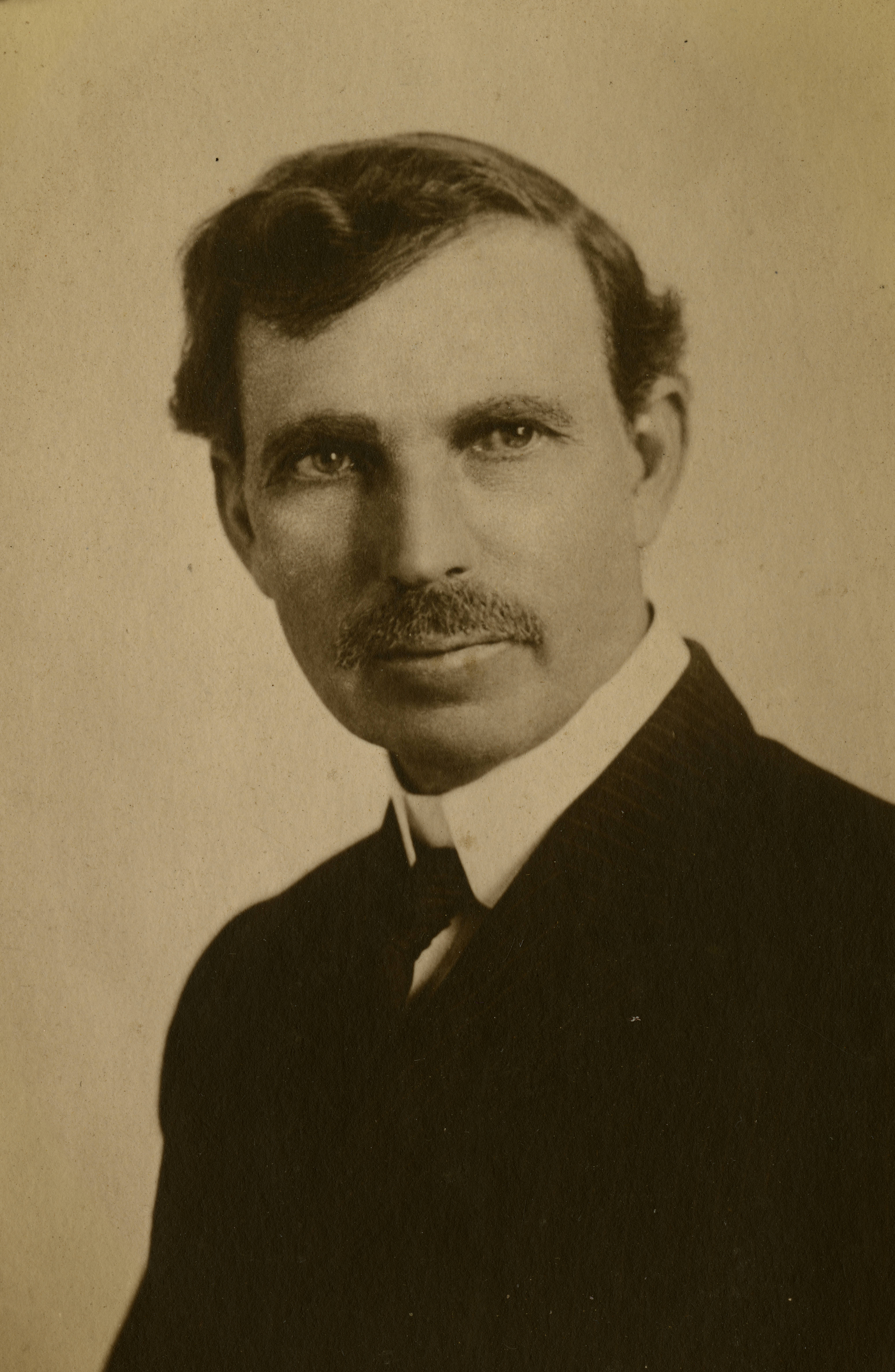
William L. Mayo, photograph circa 1910

The history of East Texas Normal College (ETNC) comprises the history of the university now known as East Texas A&M University from its foundation as a private normal college in 1889 to its acquisition by the State of Texas in 1917. It was founded in Cooper by Kentucky native William L. Mayo, who served as its president from its foundation until his death in 1917, and moved to Commerce after its original campus burned down in 1894. A popular school for active teachers seeking state certification or recertification, it was largely shaped by Mayo's own personal beliefs about education, which focused on participation and hands-on learning instead of memorization or rote learning.

ETNC's relative success during this period led to rivalry with other nearby colleges such as T. Henry Bridges' Henry College in Campbell, a 1904 attempt by Denison to entice Mayo to relocate the college there for a considerable amount of financial aid, and praise from perhaps its most famous alumnus, future Speaker of the U.S. House of Representatives Sam Rayburn. By the time the 35th Texas Legislature voted to buy the college in 1917, it had educated more than 30,000 students, including more public school teachers than any other college or university in Texas.

== Background ==
William L. Mayo was born in Prestonsburg, Kentucky, in 1861, and was educated at Prestonsburg Seminary, Cedar Bluff Academy in Tazewell County, Virginia, and Central Normal College in Danville, Indiana; he had planned to attend Indiana University until financial difficulties prevented him from doing so. He worked as a teacher and principal at Cedar Bluff Academy before taking a public school position in Denver, although he resigned upon arriving and learning that the school was integrated. Mayo then moved to Pecan Gap in Delta County, Texas, in 1886, where his aunt and uncle lived; he began teaching at the local public school, and by 1889 had become superintendent of nearby Cooper's public school system. During his tenure in Pecan Gap, Mayo earned a reputation as a disciplinarian, but also as a sympathetic instructor.

== Cooper ==
Original Site of East Texas Normal College Recorded Texas Historic Landmark
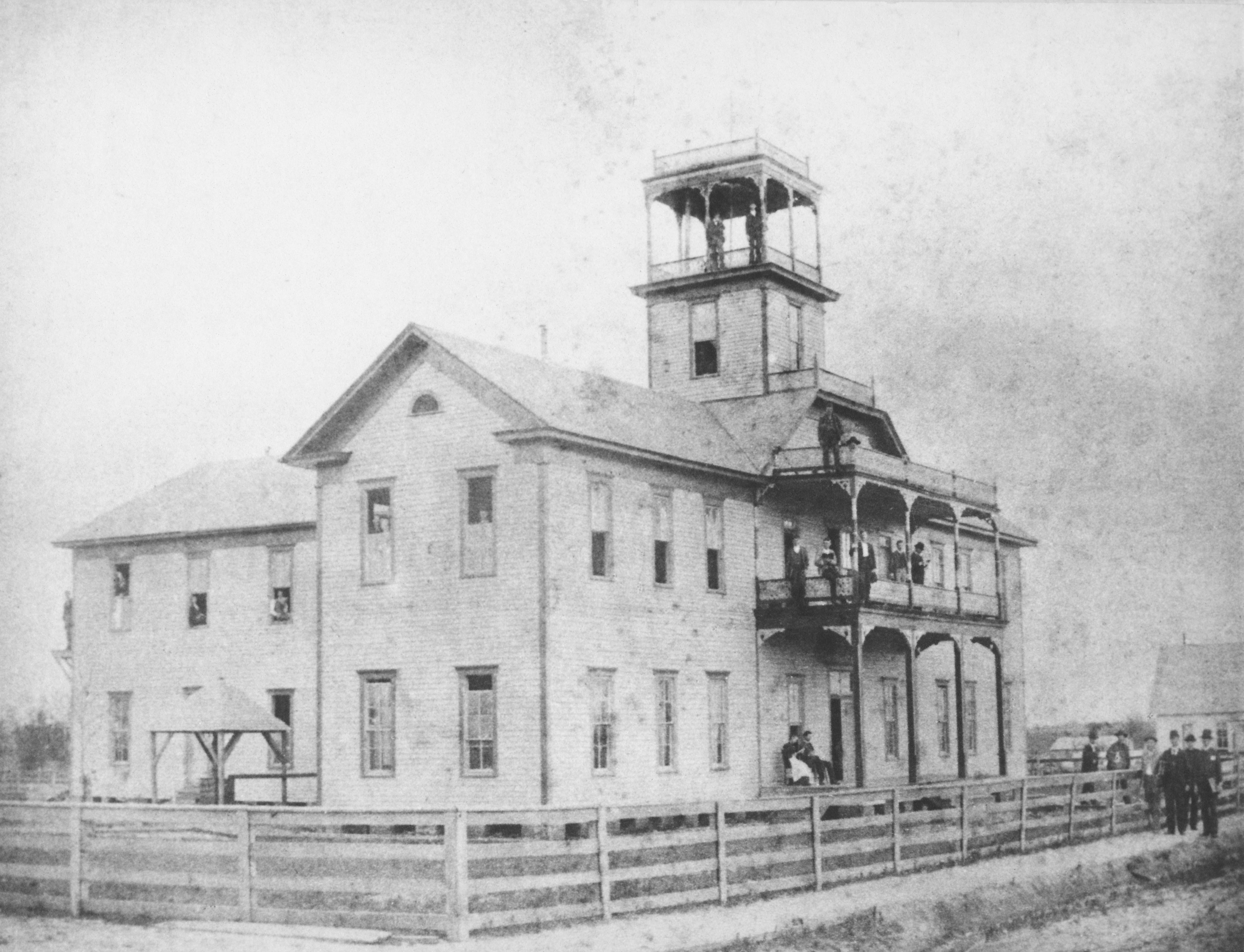
- ETNC's original Cooper campus in 1890
- Location: 600 SE First St., Cooper, Texas

History
- Built: 1889
- Demolished: 1894 (fire)

Later in 1889, Mayo founded ETNC in Cooper as a private teachers' college, although it was built on property that he purchased from the public school and was operated in connection with the existing public elementary and secondary education system. Mayo vowed that ETNC would be "a first-class private college, based on Normal principles", although at the outset it was a modest endeavor: the original campus consisted of a single, two-story frame building. Mayo served as the president of the institution from its foundation until his death in 1917. In 1891 in Cooper, he married Henrietta "Etta" Booth, a fellow ETNC instructor and native of Tennessee who had studied at the Cincinnati Conservatory of Music.

Although it grew during its first five years of existence, ETNC relocated from Cooper to Commerce after its original campus was destroyed in a fire in July 1894. Due to the fire, the lack of railroad service in Cooper, his fairly poor personal financial situation, and a disturbing public execution that occurred near the college in 1894, Mayo looked to move ETNC to whichever community made him the best offer, ultimately selecting Commerce after it promised him land and $20,000. According to Gladys Mayo, the daughter of William and Etta Mayo, her father did not have "any desire to rebuild in Cooper", and "was anxiously looking around for a place where he might re-establish the college". One of Commerce's chief advantages was that it was well connected by rail, boasting regular service on the St. Louis Southwestern Railway of Texas ("Cotton Belt") to Dallas, Sherman, and Texarkana and on the Texas Midland Railroad to Paris, Ennis, and Houston.

== Commerce ==
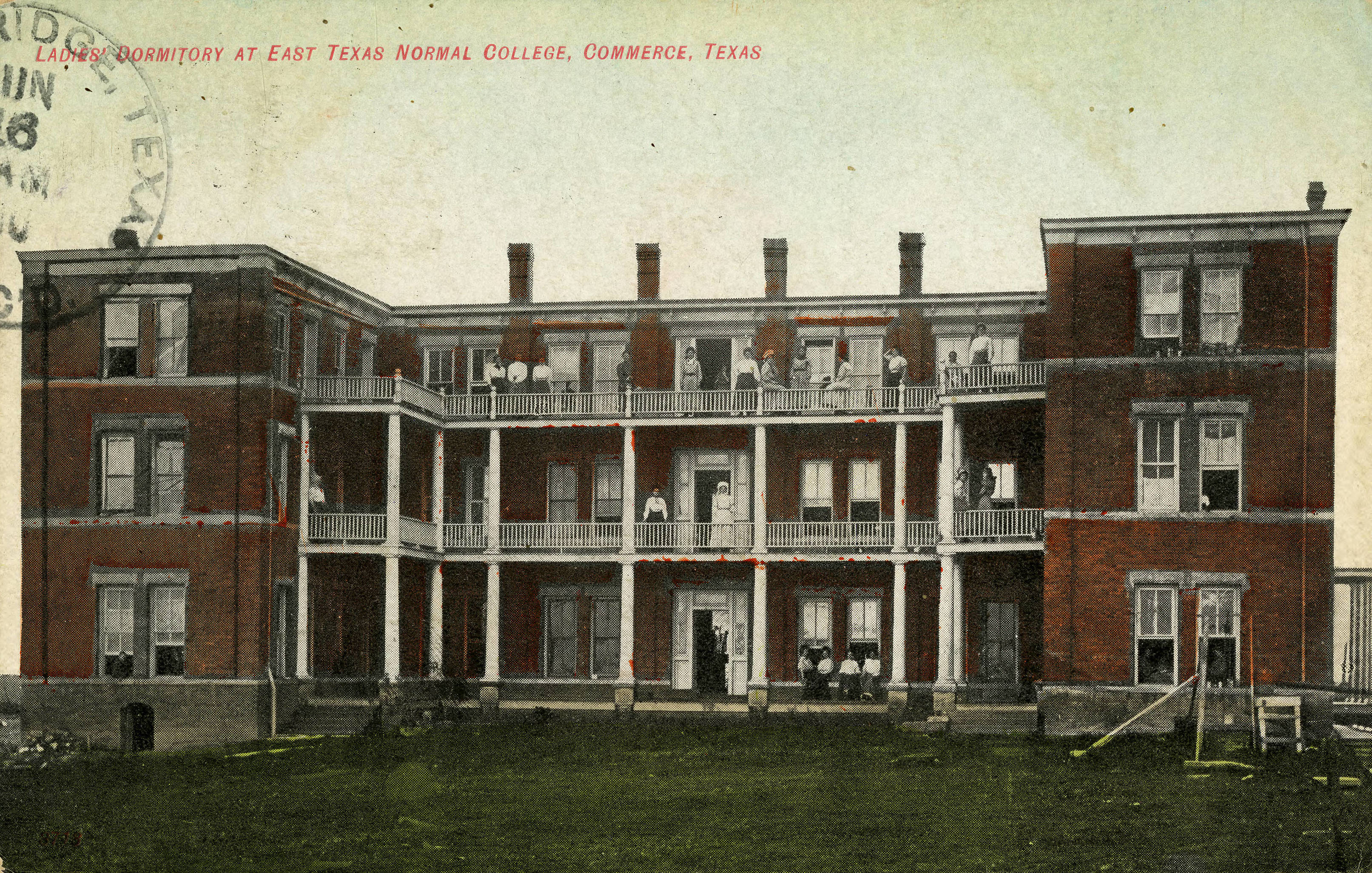
ETNC's Ladies Dormitory in Commerce in 1910

ETNC resumed operation in Commerce in September 1894 with just 35 students in a small rented store, although shortly thereafter a two-story classroom and administration building known as College Hall, as well as two dormitories were built. At the time of the move William and Etta Mayo were the college's only two faculty members, and just 10 students followed them from Cooper to Commerce. In 1899, ETNC opened a three-story dormitory for both male and female students that contained 80 rooms and could accommodate 160 students, which was followed by a second, 43-room dormitory in 1904. The college grew slowly but steadily during the 1890s, reaching 132 students in 1896 and 212 in 1897, all the while bolstering its faculty as funds permitted. Although its tradition of "summer normals", shorter courses for active teachers seeking state certification or recertification, dated back to 1891, they grew rapidly through the 1890s; by 1907, ETNC had established a reputation as "the best attended summer institute for teachers in the state".

The general success of William L. Mayo and his college even inflamed the passions of their competitors, most especially T. Henry Bridges, the head of Henry College in nearby Campbell. According to William E. Sawyer, in the aftermath of Reconstruction the Southern-educated Bridges viewed the Northern-educated Mayo as a carpetbagger. After a battle of words between the two college presidents in local newspaper columns, on August 24, 1896, Bridges drove into Commerce in his horse and buggy to confront Mayo, first asking him to sign a statement retracting his written claims. When Mayo refused, Bridges drew his revolver on Mayo, and after he missed his target twice, Bridges proceeded to strike Mayo with 15 to 20 lashes of his whip. The disturbance attracted an angry mob of ETNC students, who drove Bridges out of town. Bridges' Henry College would ultimately become defunct in 1901.

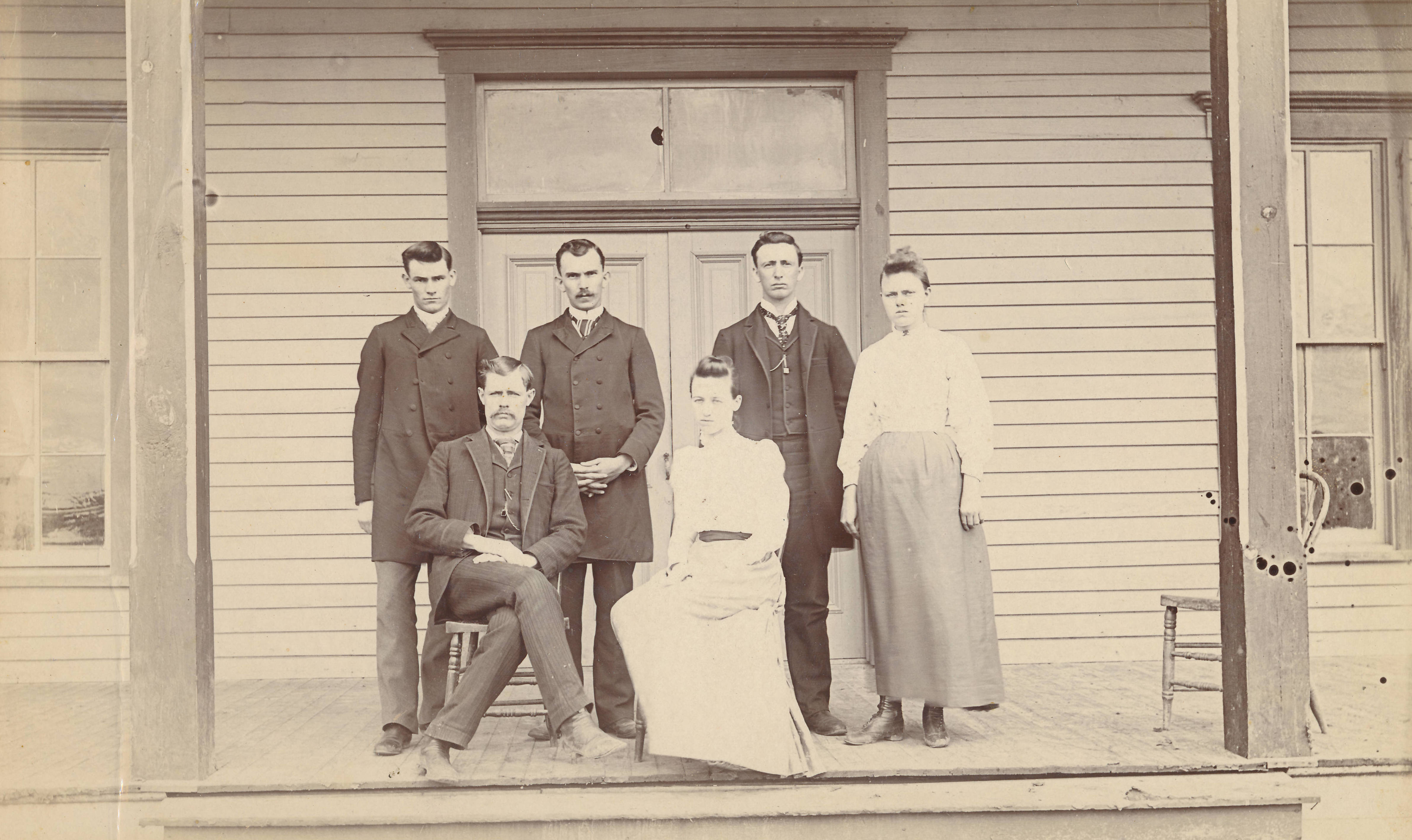
ETNC students in Cooper, circa 1890–1894

Perhaps the most famous ETNC alumnus was future Democratic politician and Speaker of the U.S. House of Representatives Sam Rayburn, who graduated with a bachelor's degree in 1903. Rayburn spoke positively of the school, especially Mayo's credit system that allowed students to "attend free with a promise to pay when they got out and made some money", which "made it possible for hundreds and hundreds of young people to go to college who could not have afforded to attend another institution".

ETNC's early success also attracted the attention of other communities in North Texas, and in 1904 Denison attempted to entice Mayo to relocate the college there for a considerable amount of financial aid. Whether or not Mayo seriously considered the offer is unknown, but he was able to use it as leverage to persuade Commerce to give the college $30,000 over the next three years for the promise that it would remain, money that was mostly used to renovate and expand ETNC's physical plant.

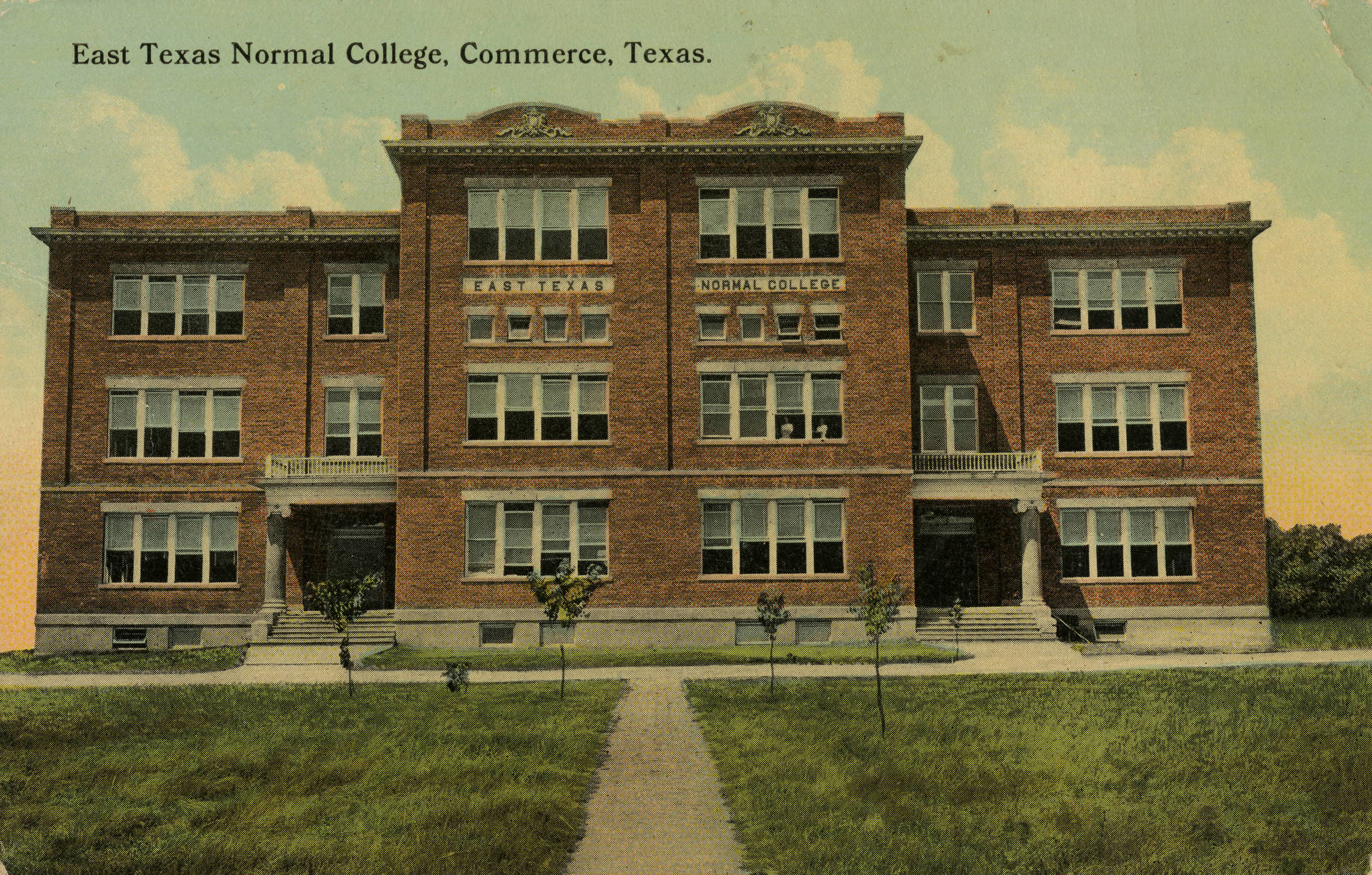
ETNC's "Old Main" building in Commerce in 1912

After moving to Commerce due to a major fire that destroyed its original Cooper campus, the ETNC campus burned twice more: first on January 28, 1907, when College Hall burned after recently being renovated, and then again on January 7, 1911, when the entire campus save for one building burned in a fire that caused approximately $80,000 in damage. The only building to survive the 1911 fire was "Old Main", which had been opened in February 1908 to replace College Hall.

During this period, extracurricular activities for students at ETNC consisted primarily of student clubs known as "literary societies", various programs organized by the college itself, and athletics in the form of both intramural sports (including baseball and basketball) as well as an intercollegiate football team (despite Mayo's strong initial opposition to the concept).

=== Curriculum ===
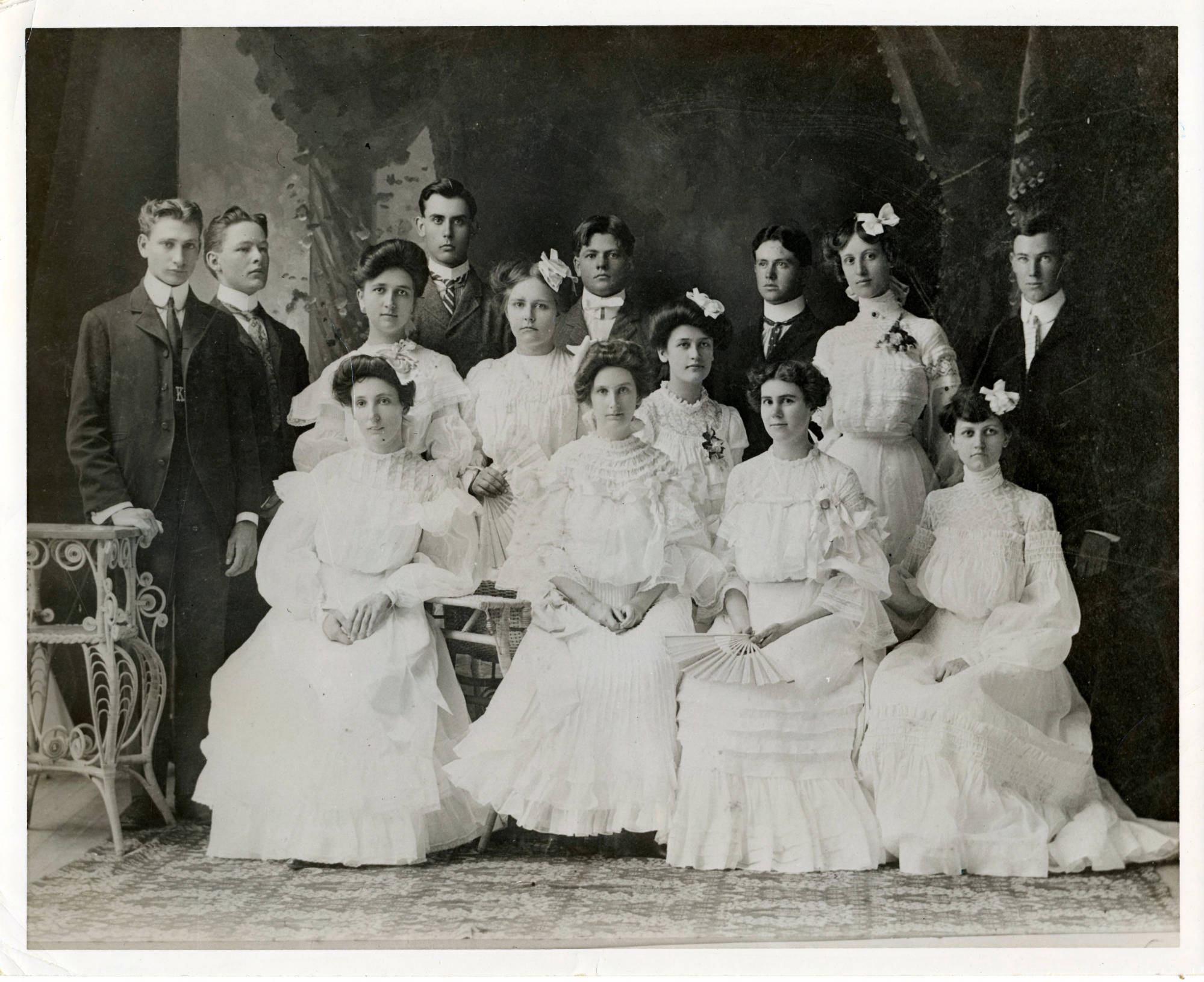
ETNC graduating class, circa 1900

The early curriculum taught by ETNC reflected Mayo's own personal beliefs about education, focusing on participation and hands-on learning instead of memorization or rote learning. Speaking in terms of a hypothetical student, Mayo described his philosophy as "instead of lecturing for him, put him to lecturing you." In the words of high school English instructor David Gold, Mayo "ruled his school with unquestioned authority, boxing unruly students about the ears, sending others home for infractions, and insisting upon exacting standards for English instruction". Gold describes Mayo's pedagogy as "complex" and argues that "Mayo complicates and challenges our attempts to create discrete classifications of rhetorical epistemologies and to connect pedagogical practices to political ideologies".

In 1900, ETNC offered courses in nine subjects (mathematics, philosophy, science, and six languages: English, French, German, Greek, Latin, and Spanish), and its library contained approximately 3,500 volumes. That year, the average cost of tuition was $4 per month, and room and board was $8.10 per month.

Each day of classes began with an optional 50-minute "morning chapel" session, which featured both spiritual and (more often) secular speakers, oftentimes Mayo himself giving a motivational lecture. During its early years, most students came to ETNC with only an eighth-grade education and spent their first full year in the school's preparatory program before entering the "college department" for their second year. All of the college's most popular degrees (B.S., B. Lit., and B. Ped.) required just three years of study, while only the demanding A.B. required a full four years and a rigorous "classic course". Mayo experimented with a fifth-year master's program in 1905, but it never progressed past its pilot stage.

== State acquisition ==
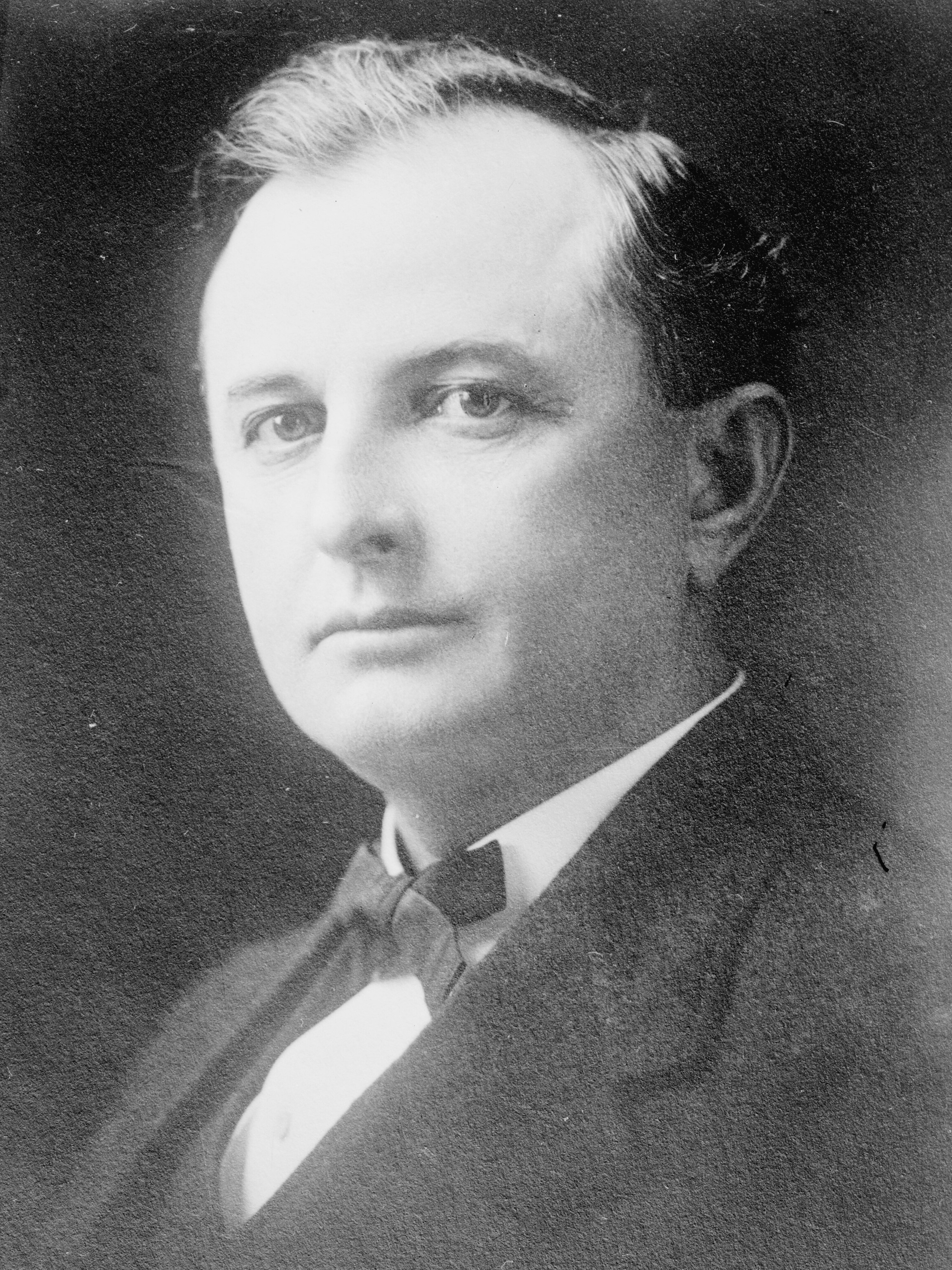
Governor James "Pa" Ferguson, who signed the bill that purchased ETNC for the state

Encouraged by two of his friends, Mayo lobbied the State of Texas to purchase ETNC and transform it into a state teachers' college, by placing it "under the authority of the board of regents of the state normal schools". Despite significant opposition, the 35th Texas Legislature voted to buy the college and the board of regents ultimately committed to pay Mayo $80,000 for the school, in comparison to the $170,000 it was estimated to be worth at the time. On March 14, 1917, a telegram arrived in Commerce confirming that the House of Representatives in Austin had passed the requisite bill to ensure the state purchase of ETNC by a margin of 79 to 41, and Mayo died of a sudden heart attack. (Note: According to Babb and Reynolds, Mayo died just minutes before the arrival of the telegram, never having heard the news. However, according to Harper, Mayo did receive the telegram, and suffered his heart attack while walking back to ETNC from the telegraph office.) Despite Mayo's unexpected death, the state purchased the college after Governor James "Pa" Ferguson signed the bill into law on April 4, thereby transferring ETNC's 50 acres (20 ha) of land as well as all of its buildings (which were renovated with $40,000 donated by the City of Commerce) to the state.

Between 1889 and 1917, ETNC was an independent private college that only gained income from tuition and a modest profit from its dormitories; it had no endowment. During this period, it offered six degree programs and educated more than 30,000 students, including more public school teachers than any other institution of higher learning in Texas during the same period; the college also gained a reputation for educating rural school teachers. In 1917, ETNC counted almost 2,000 currently enrolled students.

In 1918, C. E. Evans, the president of Southwest Texas State Normal School in San Marcos, opined that during its existence as a private school ETNC did "excellent work for the State" and that "many of its graduates are today very successful teachers in the public schools".
