= Wahrenberger House =

Historic house in Texas, United States

- U.S. National Register of Historic Places
- Recorded Texas Historic Landmark
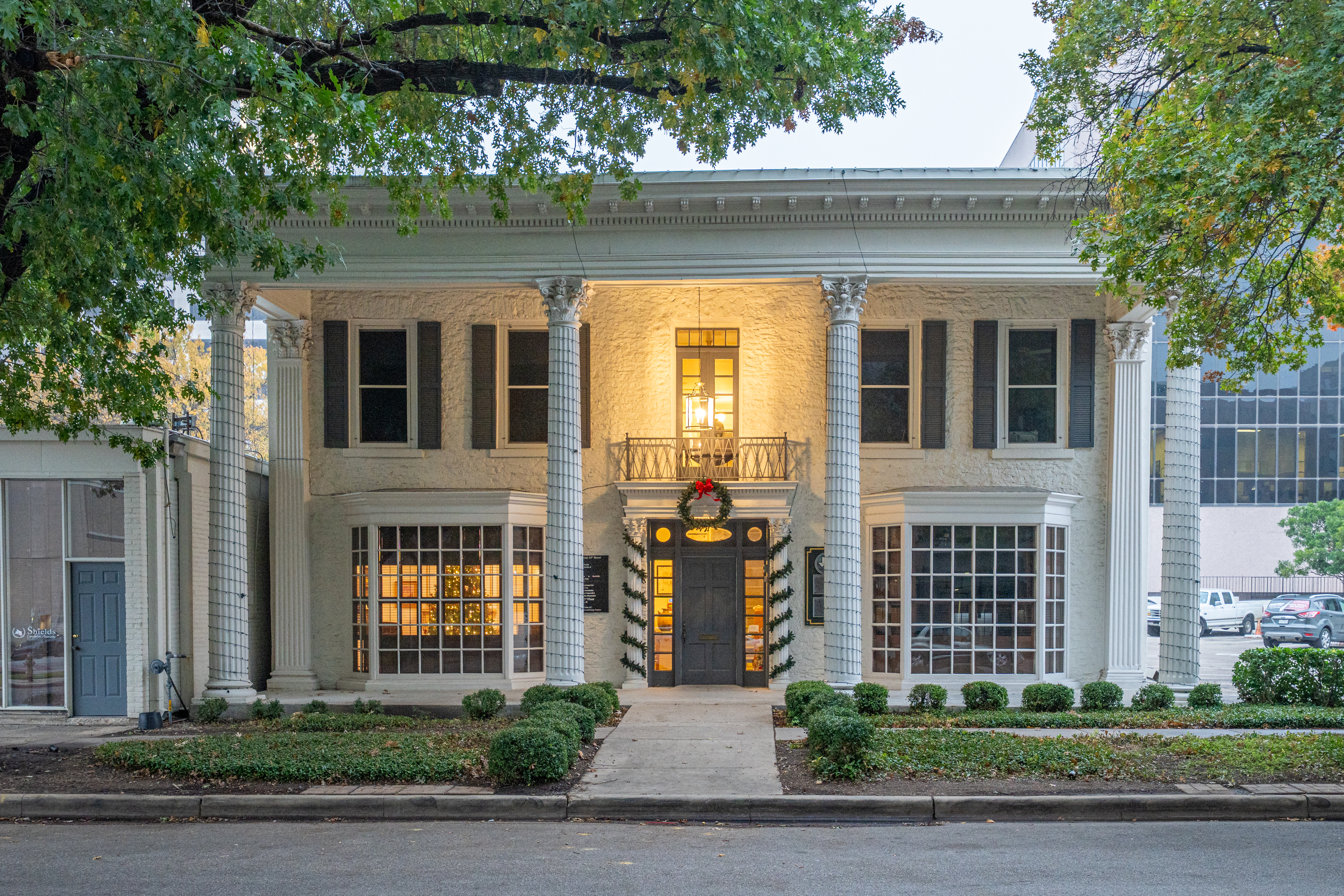

- Location within Texas Location within the United States
- Location: 208 W. 14th Street; Austin, Texas
- Coordinates: 30°16′36″N 97°44′30″W
- Built: 1867–1868
- Architectural style: Classical Revival
- NRHP reference No.: 78002995
- RTHL No.: 6421

Significant dates
- Added to NRHP: February 23, 1978
- Designated RTHL: 1972

The Wahrenberger House is located two blocks from the Texas Capitol, at 208 W. 14th Street, in Austin, Travis County, in the U.S. state of Texas. The home was built between 1867 and 1868 by Friedrich Huster and sold to Charles Klein after completion. The house is named for Klein's daughter Caroline Wahrenberger, who was deeded the house in 1882. Since it was built, the house has served as a residence for several generations of the Klein–Wahrenberger family, and was the location for two German–American schools. At different times, both Pat Morris Neff and Sam Rayburn lived in the residence when Mrs. Wahrenberger ran it as a boarding house. It was added to the National Register of Historic Places listings in Travis County, Texas in 1978, and was designated a Recorded Texas Historic Landmark in 1972.

== Architecture ==
Originally a two-story limestone residence when it was built in 1867–68, this house erected by Friedrich Huster has undergone a few changes. Both the main unit, as well as its separate one-story kitchen facility, were topped with a gabled roof. When Charles Klein acquired the residence, he added a second story and a one-story front porch. In 1916, a two–story gallery that had been added in 1887, was removed in favor of a two–story portico with columns. Later changes covered the limestone walls with stucco, in all but the north section of the house. 1946 was the last year the house served as a private residence.

== Leased property ==
Klein, and later his daughter, operated the house as a lease property. The German–American Ladies College was operated in the house 1874–1879, under the management of Natalie von Schenck and Alice Nohl.

In 1880, Klein leased the premises to Jacob Bickler, founder of the Texas German and English Academy. Bicker was the nephew of educator Philip Bickler who ran the Bickler German–English Academy in Austin. Jacob Bickler began the Texas German and English Academy in 1876, and in 1880 began operating the academy out of the Wahrenberger House. He later moved the academy to the larger Texas Military Institute Castle in Austin, but Bickler himself retained the lease on the house until 1886. On November 9, 1881, the old Texas Capitol was destroyed by fire. Due to their close proximity to the capitol building, Bickler and his students responded to the fire by rescuing many of the historical records housed in the Capitol.

Bickler was still leasing the property in 1882 when Klein deeded it over to his daughter Caroline Wahrenberger. Her husband, local businessman John Wahrenberger, died in 1864, leaving Caroline with four children to support. After the Bickler lease ended, Wahrenberger lived in the residence and ran it as a boarding house. Notable among the boarders were future Texas governor Pat Morris Neff and future Speaker of the United States House of Representatives Sam Rayburn. At the time, Rayburn was a student at the University of Texas Law School. After Caroline Wahrenberger died in 1916, her daughters Mary and Josephine inherited the property. They, in turn, passed the property to their heirs. In 1946, the house became a business property.
