= Statue of Sam Houston =

Statue of Sam Houston may refer to:

- Statue of Sam Houston (Ney), two versions of the same composition by Elisabet Ney, at the Texas State Capitol and the U.S. Capitol
- Sam Houston Monument, with an equestrian statue by Enrico Cerracchio, at Hermann Park, Houston, Texas, United States
- A Tribute to Courage by David Adickes, Huntsville, Texas, United States
