= Sam Houston (disambiguation) =

Sam Houston (1793–1863) was an American politician and soldier in Texas.

Sam Houston may also refer to:

== People ==
- Sam Houston (Maine soldier) (fl. 1770s), American soldier
- Sam Houston (wrestler) (born 1963), American wrestler
- Samuel Walker Houston (1864–1945), African-American pioneer in the field of education
- Sam Houston Jr. (1843–1894), oldest child of Texas politician Sam Houston

== Other ==
- Sam Houston Industrial and Training School (1907–1930) in Walker County, Texas
- Sam Houston State University in Huntsville, Texas
- Sam Houston Bearkats, the university's athletic program
- Sam Houston Race Park, for horses
- Sam Houston (Toward the Terra), fictional human character in comic & animation
- Sam Houston Monument, a 1925 bronze sculpture by Enrico Cerracchio
- USS Sam Houston (1861), a small schooner captured by the Union Navy
- USS Sam Houston (SSBN-609), an Ethan Allen-class submarine

== See also ==
- List of places named for Sam Houston
- Samuel B. Huston (1858–1920), American politician
