= 1857 Texas gubernatorial election =

- August 3, 1857
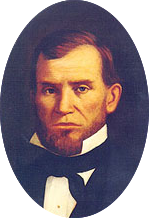

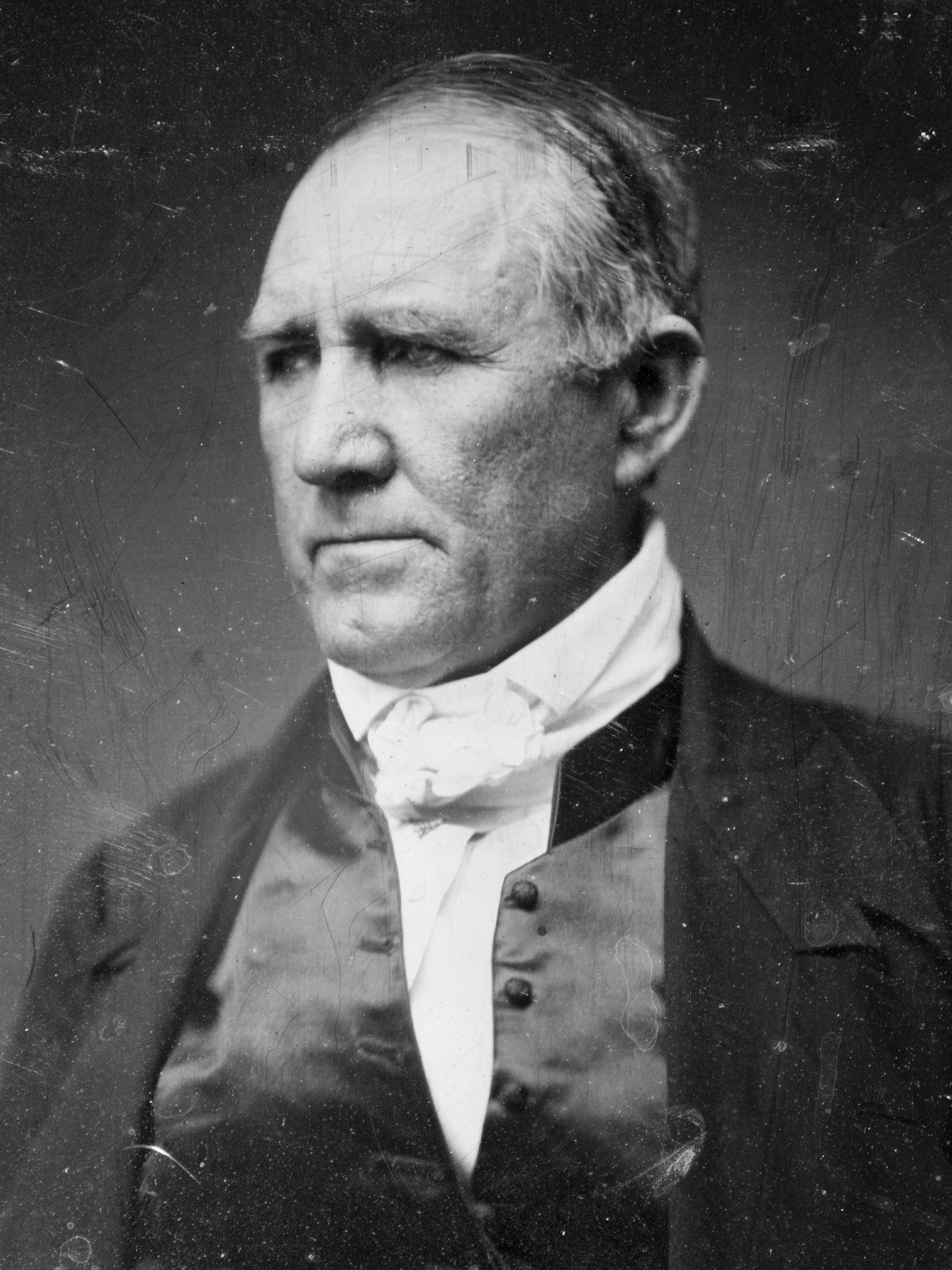
Nominee	Hardin R. Runnels	Sam Houston
Party	Democratic	Independent
Popular vote	32,552	23,628
Percentage	57.94%	42.06%
County Results
Runnels
50–60%
60–70%
70–80%
80–90%
>90%
Houston
50–60%
60–70%
70–80%
Unknown/No Vote
Governor before election
Elisha M. Pease
Democratic
Elected Governor
Hardin R. Runnels
Democratic

The 1857 Texas gubernatorial election was held on August 3, 1857, to elect the governor of Texas. The election pitted Lieutenant Governor Hardin Richard Runnels against former President of the Republic of Texas Sam Houston. Runnels won the election with 57% of the vote, becoming the only person to ever defeat Sam Houston in a political contest.

== Background ==
Since the 1848 election, the Democratic Party had become the dominant political apparatus in the state. However, when it came to statewide offices, the party lacked organization for nominating candidates and most campaigns were conducted on an independent basis. The sudden rise and success of the American Party, popularly called the "Know Nothings", in the elections of 1854 and 1855, especially the dramatic party swaps of several high-profile Democratic officials, shocked the Democrats and triggered a mass organizational and logistical campaign to solidify the influence of the party's internal operation. After multiple years of having conventions fail due to lack of attendance from across the state, this drive resulted in the 1856 state convention having over 200 delegates from 91 of the state's 99 counties.

The Know Nothings also held a convention in 1856, but the national party collapsed over a split on the issue of slavery which was the defining political question of the era. In addition to the Know Nothings nativist and anti-catholic stances, many in the South were attracted to the party over its support of maintaining the Union amid rising sectionalism and threats of secession. The most prominent of these politicians in Texas was United States Senator and former President of Texas, Sam Houston.

The 1857 Democratic convention was the largest ever had up to that point, and for the first time it nominated a unified slate of candidates for statewide office. Runnels had won the Democratic party's nomination for governor as a southern fire-eater and along with his candidate for Lieutenant Governor, Francis Lubbock, they were generally considered the more radical ticket.

The collapse of the Know Nothings had left the Democratic Party as the sole political organization in the state. The Democrats emprace of sectionalist rhetoric left those with unionist sympathies without a party to support. As such the most prominent unionist in the state, Senator Sam Houston, decided to launch an independent campaign for governor on their support.

== Campaign ==
Most of the prominent newspapers backed Runnels for the governorship, with twenty-eight of them supporting Runnels, nine supporting Houston, and a few others were undecided. One Tyler paper declared, "The few Houston men in our ranks can do no harm; they cannot help him out of the ditch."

Houston was the Class 2 Senator from Texas at the time and had earned the ire of many of his statesmen because of his opposition to the Kansas-Nebraska Act, and his insistence on preservation of the Union above all else. Houston campaigned tirelessly, making over 60 speeches, Houston campaigned heavily in East Texas in the summer of 1857, traveling in a buggy and speaking in Gilmer, Marshall, Henderson, Rusk and Tyler, among many other Piney Woods villages.

A lot of Texans were less than pleased with Houston and his politics. One anti-Houston newspaper noted Sam "spoke nearly three hours. His speech was a compound of abuse and egotism. Abusive without the merit of wit or sarcasm and egotistical without the sanction of historical truth."

Runnels on the other hand was not known for his oaratorical skills, so his running mate for lieutenant governor, Francis R. Lubbock, did most of the campaigning.

== General election ==
=== Candidates ===
- Sam Houston, U.S. Senator, former President of the Republic of Texas (Independent)
- Hardin R. Runnells, lieutenant governor, plantation owner, former Speaker of the Texas House of Representatives (Democratic)

=== Results ===
1857 Texas gubernatorial election
Party	Candidate	Votes	%
Democratic	Hardin Richard Runnels	32,552	57.94%
Independent	Sam Houston	23,628	42.06%
Total votes		61,180	100.00%
Democratic hold			

== Aftermath ==
On election night Houston was defeated by over 15%, the Democratic party interpreted this as a mandate to take an extreme stand and Runnels' course differed from that of outgoing governor, Elisha Pease. He issued ultimatums to the national government and threatened secession if his demands were not met. In his inaugural address, he demanded that Kansas be admitted as a slave state and warned that if this demand was not met the South would be justified in seceding from the Union. The slavery issue dominated state politics, but Runnels found his most pressing problem was Native Americans on the warpath. It was during his administration that the Texas Rangers were reorganized and strengthened to fight the Comanches and Kiowas.

However, many Texans were hesitant about the Democrats sudden embrace of Radicalism and Disunion, in particular its attempt to add reopening of the Trans-Atlantic Slave Trade to the party platform, as well as the increase in Indian hostilities on the frontier and in the next gubernatorial election Sam Houston was able to defeat Runnels by a similar margin.
