= List of monuments and memorials to Sam Houston =

The following is a partial list of monuments and memorials to Sam Houston, Governor of Tennessee (1827–1829), President of the Republic of Texas (1836–1838 and 1841–1844), and Governor of Texas (1859–1861).

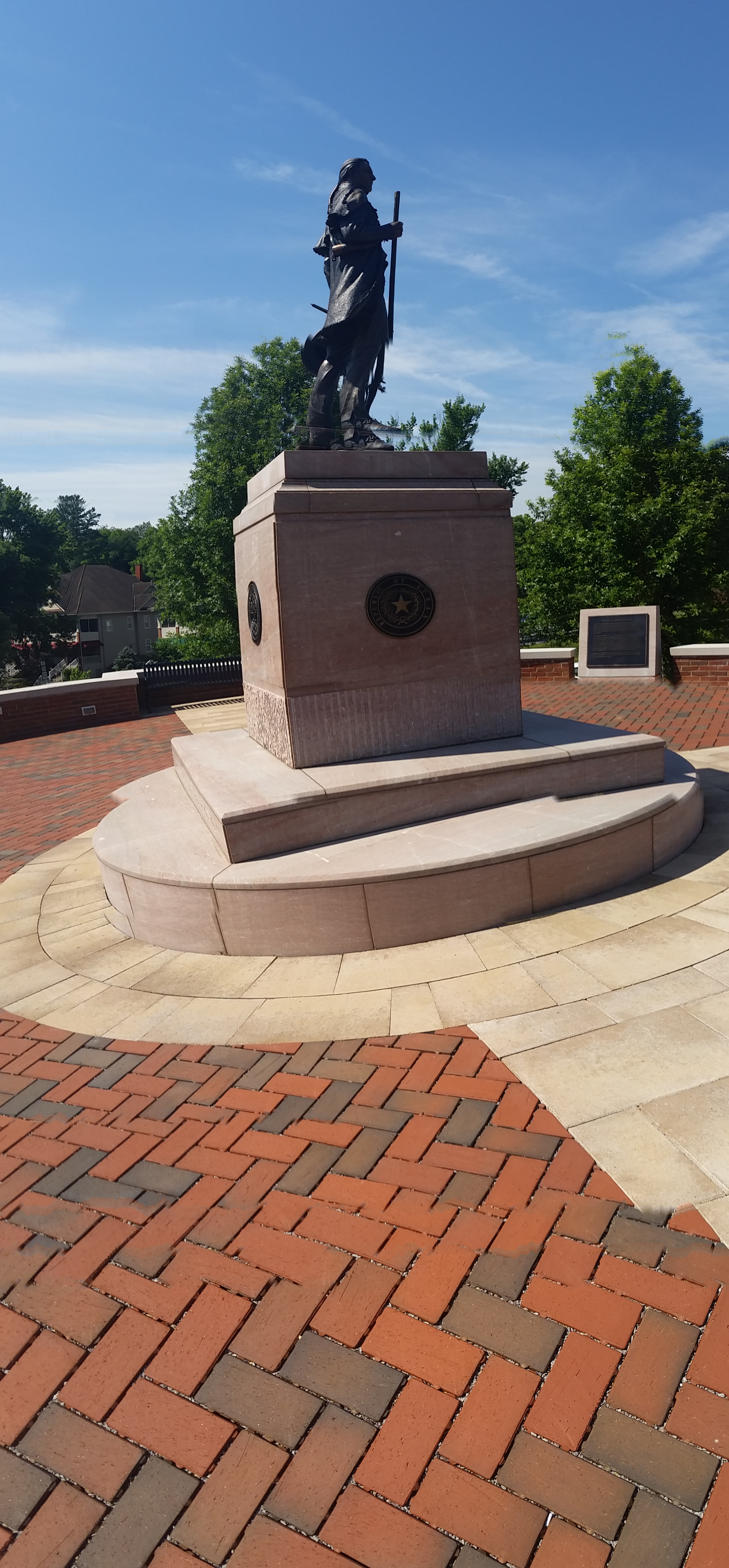
Monument in Maryville, TN

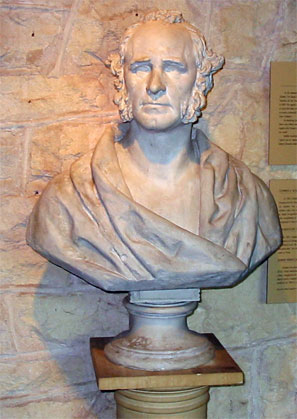
Bust of Houston by Elisabet Ney

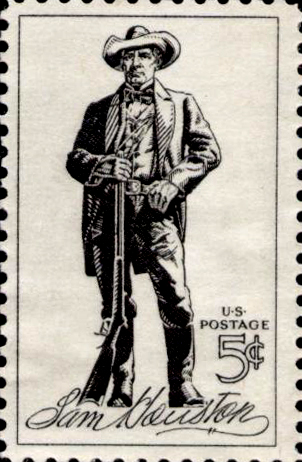
Sam Houston, Commemorative Issue of 1963

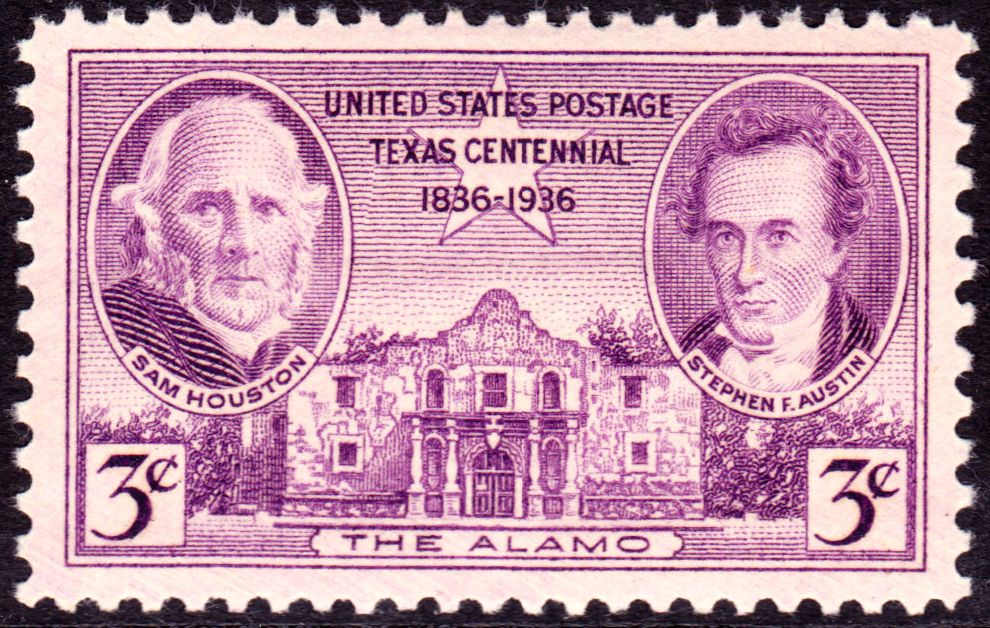
Texas Centennial Issue of 1936, showing Sam Houston, The Alamo, and Stephen F. Austin

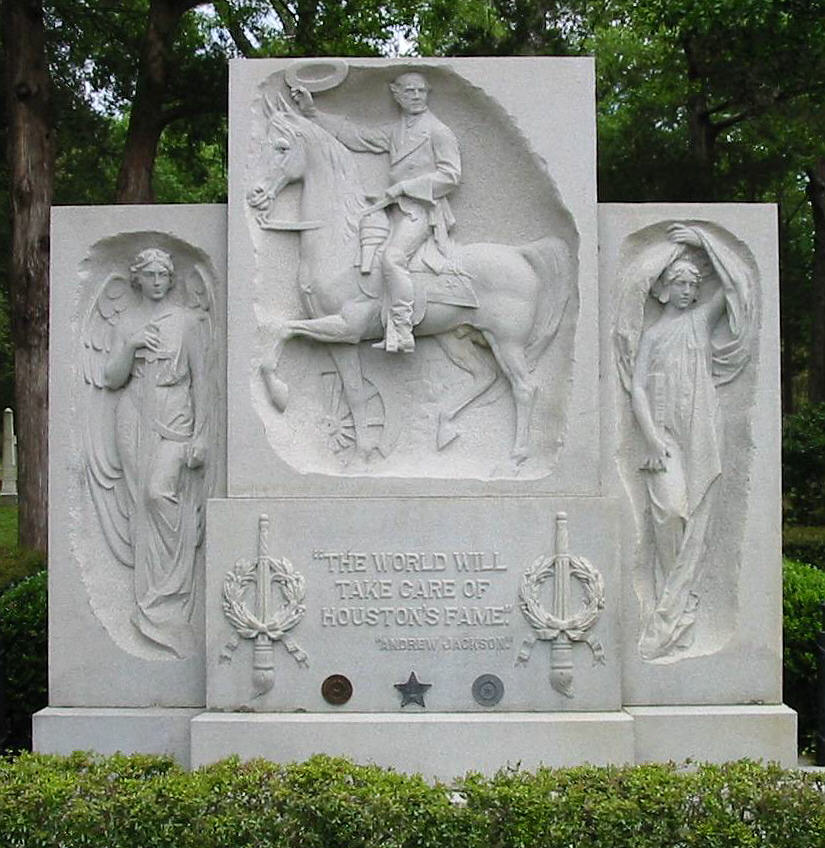
Sam Houston's grave in Huntsville.

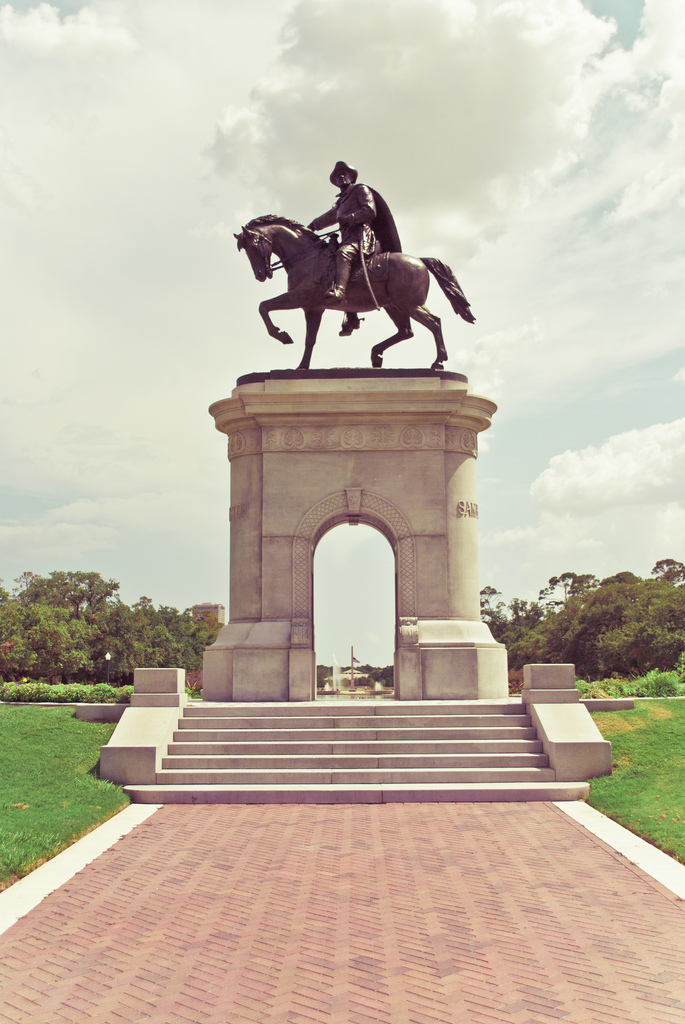
Sam Houston Monument, Hermann Park, Houston

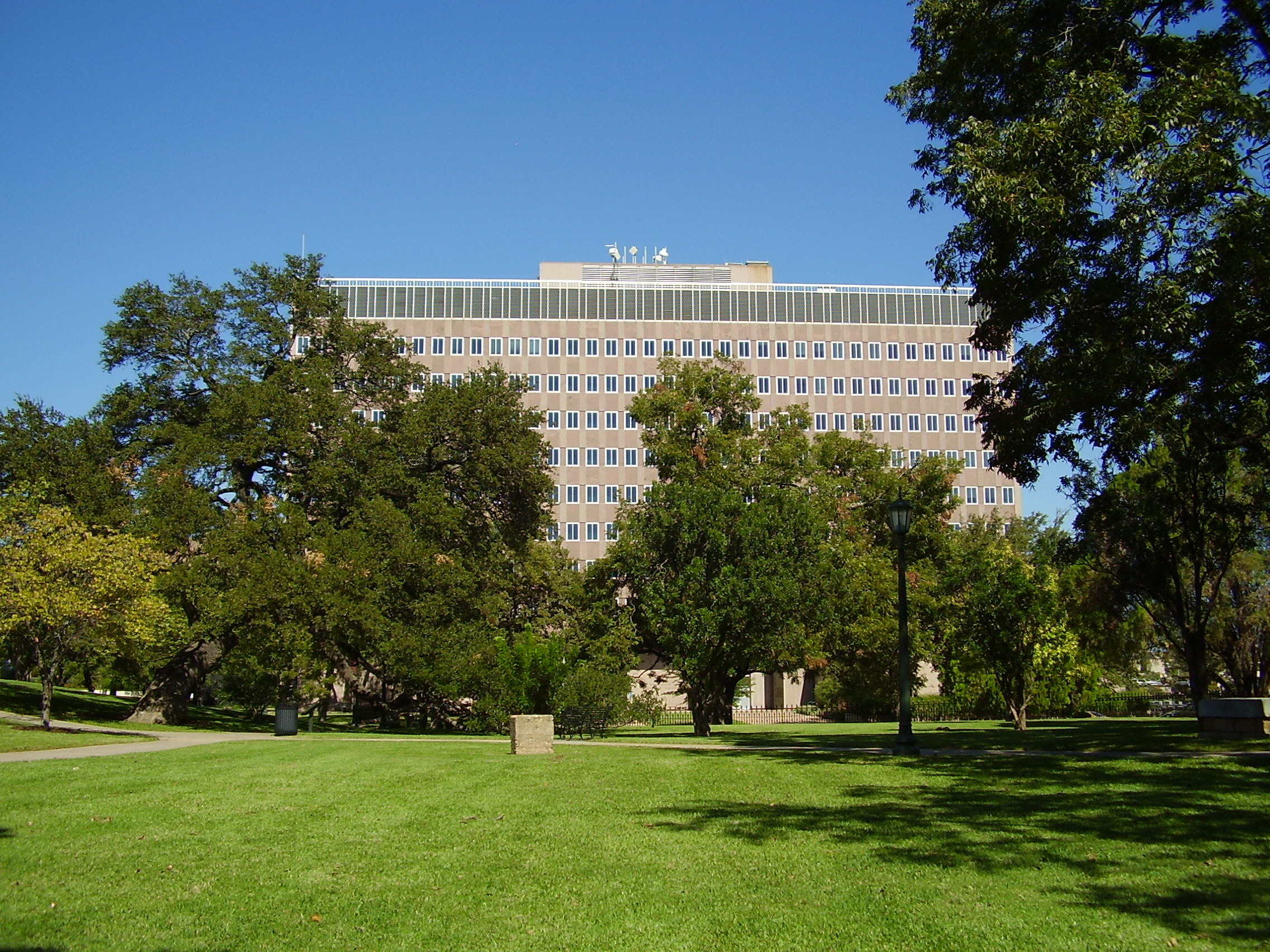
The Sam Houston State Office Building houses the headquarters of the Texas Ethics Commission and the Texas State Preservation Board

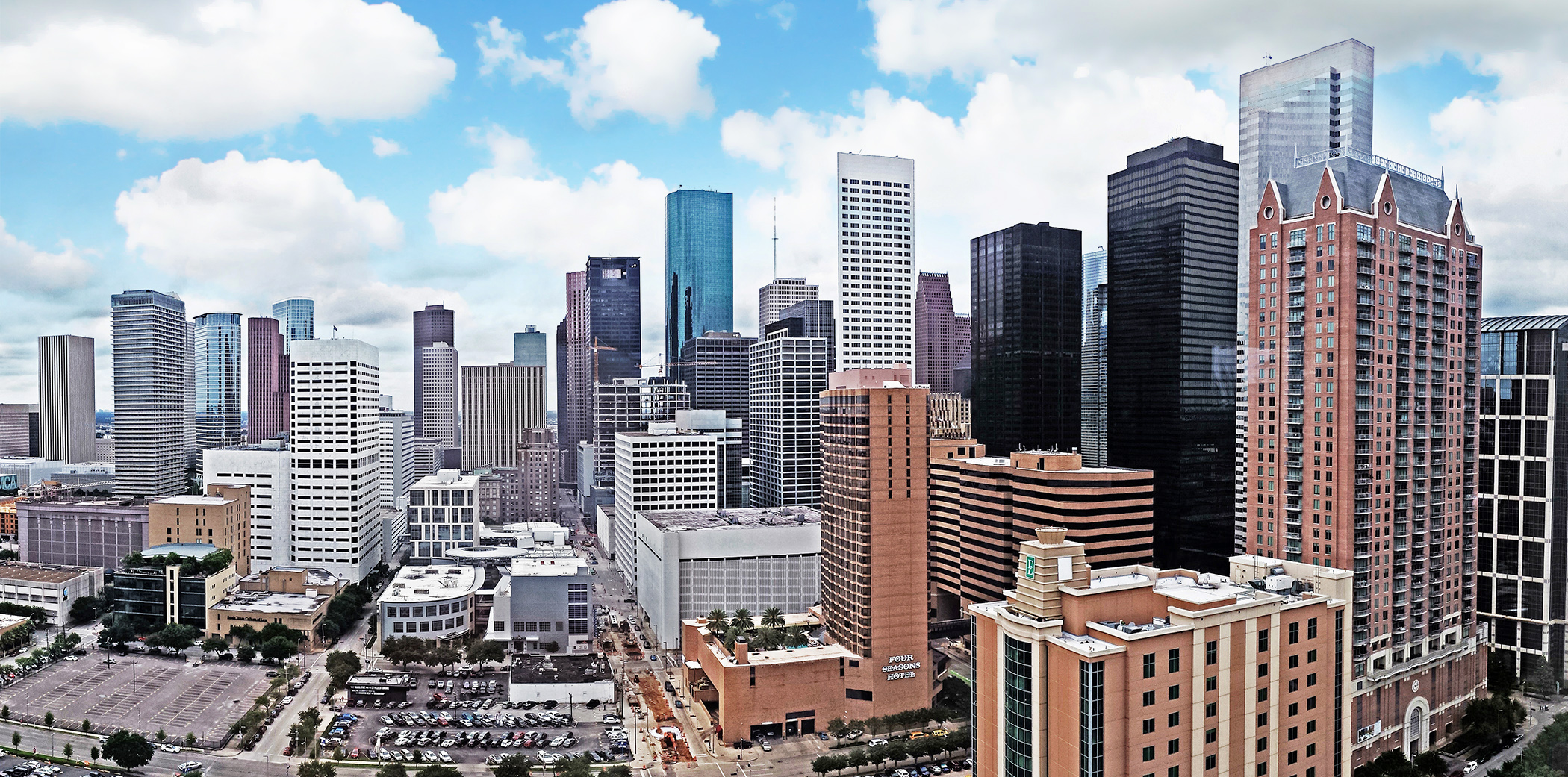
The U.S. city of Houston in Southeast Texas was named in his honor.
- Houston County, Texas, about 100 miles north of the city of Houston, was named for him.
- Huntsville, Texas, is the home of the Sam Houston Memorial Museum; A Tribute to Courage (a 67 ft (20 m) statue); Sam Houston State University; and Houston's gravesite, including a monument by Pompeo Coppini unveiled in 1911.
- A bronze equestrian sculpture of Houston, depicting him at the Battle of San Jacinto in 1836, is located in Hermann Park in Houston. In 2017, amid a wave of removal of Confederate monuments and memorials, there was discussion on social media about its possible removal, and a pro-Confederate demonstration against its removal. (See Monument and memorial controversies in the United States#Texas.)
- The Sam Houston Wayside near Lexington, Virginia, is a 38,000-pound piece of Texas pink granite commemorating Houston's birthplace.
- The Sam Houston Schoolhouse in Maryville, Tennessee, is Tennessee's oldest schoolhouse. A museum is on the grounds.
- USS Sam Houston, an Ethan Allen-class submarine, was named after him.
- The Sam Houston National Forest, one of four national forests in Texas, was named after him.
- The Sam Houston Regional Library and Research Center, located outside of Liberty, Texas has the largest known collection of photographs and illustrations of Houston.
- Fort Sam Houston in San Antonio is named after him.
- Many cities in the U.S. have a street, school, or park named after Houston; however, New York City's Houston Street was named for William Houstoun, and is pronounced HOW-stin. Similarly pronounced Houston County, Alabama is named for Governor George S. Houston.
- The State of Texas chose Houston as one of its two statues in the Statuary Hall in the United States Capitol. (The other is of Stephen F. Austin.)
- The Sam Houston Coliseum (now demolished) in Houston was named for him.
- A mural on a gas tank depicts Houston; it is located near Texas State Highway 225 in Houston.
- Sam Houston High School, in Moss Bluff, Louisiana and Arlington, Texas
- Sam Houston Middle School, in the cities of Irving and Garland, Texas
- Sam Houston Elementary School in Lebanon and Maryville, Tennessee; Eagle Pass, Huntsville, Conroe, Weatherford, Corsicana, and Bryan, Texas, and Houston, Texas
- A bust of Houston is located inside the Virginia State Capitol Building in Richmond, Virginia
- Bust by Elisabet Ney created for the Chicago World's Fair in 1893. It is in the Elisabet Ney Museum in Austin.
- Besides the large Texas city (Houston, Texas), Houston, Mississippi and Houston, Minnesota are named after Houston
- A road encircling the city of Houston is named the Sam Houston Tollway.
- The actor Stephen Chase played Houston in the 1962 episode "Davy's Friends" of the syndicated western television series Death Valley Days, narrated by Stanley Andrews. Tommy Rettig was cast as Joel Walter Robison, a fighter for Texas independence. In the story line, Robison, called a "friend" of Davy Crockett, is sent on a diversion but quickly shows his military ability and is made a first lieutenant by Sam Houston. Russell Johnson was cast as Sergeant Tate in this segment.
- Counties in Minnesota, Tennessee, and Texas are named for Houston.
- The county seat of Texas County, Missouri is named for him.
- Sam Houston is featured with a chapter in the book Profiles in Courage by John F. Kennedy, primarily for his stance, as a U.S. Senator from Texas, against the Kansas-Nebraska Act, and his pro-Union, anti-secessionist views as Governor of Texas.
- Houston's surname namesake was the first word said from the surface of the Moon: "Houston, Tranquility Base here. The Eagle has landed."

== See also ==
- List of Texas Revolution monuments and memorials
