= 1836 Republic of Texas presidential election =

- September 5, 1836
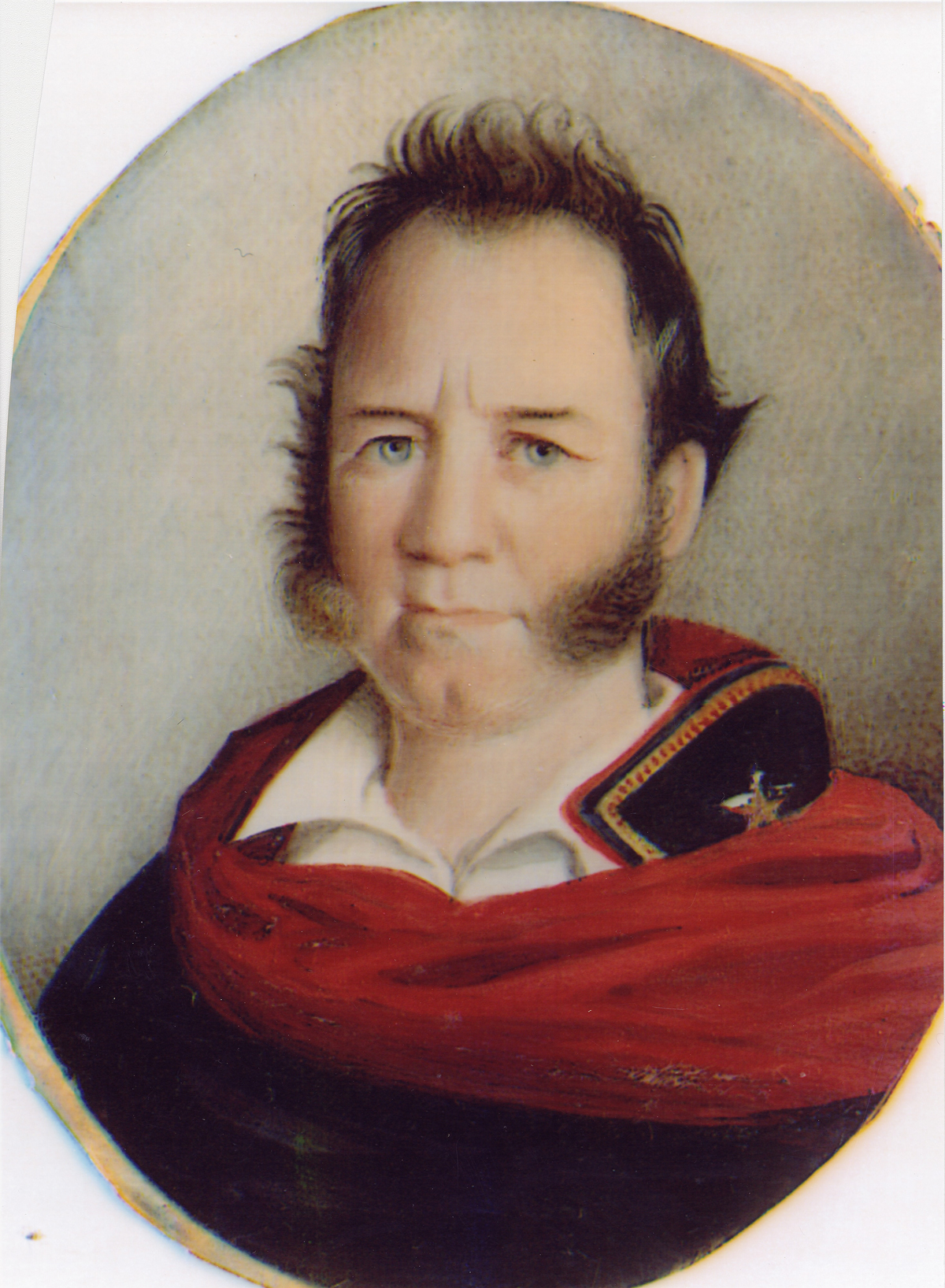

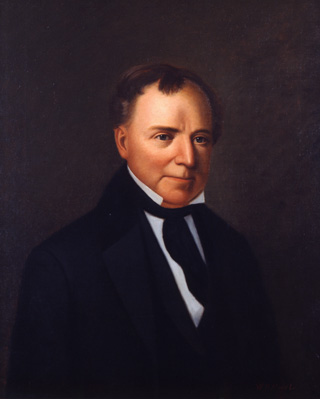

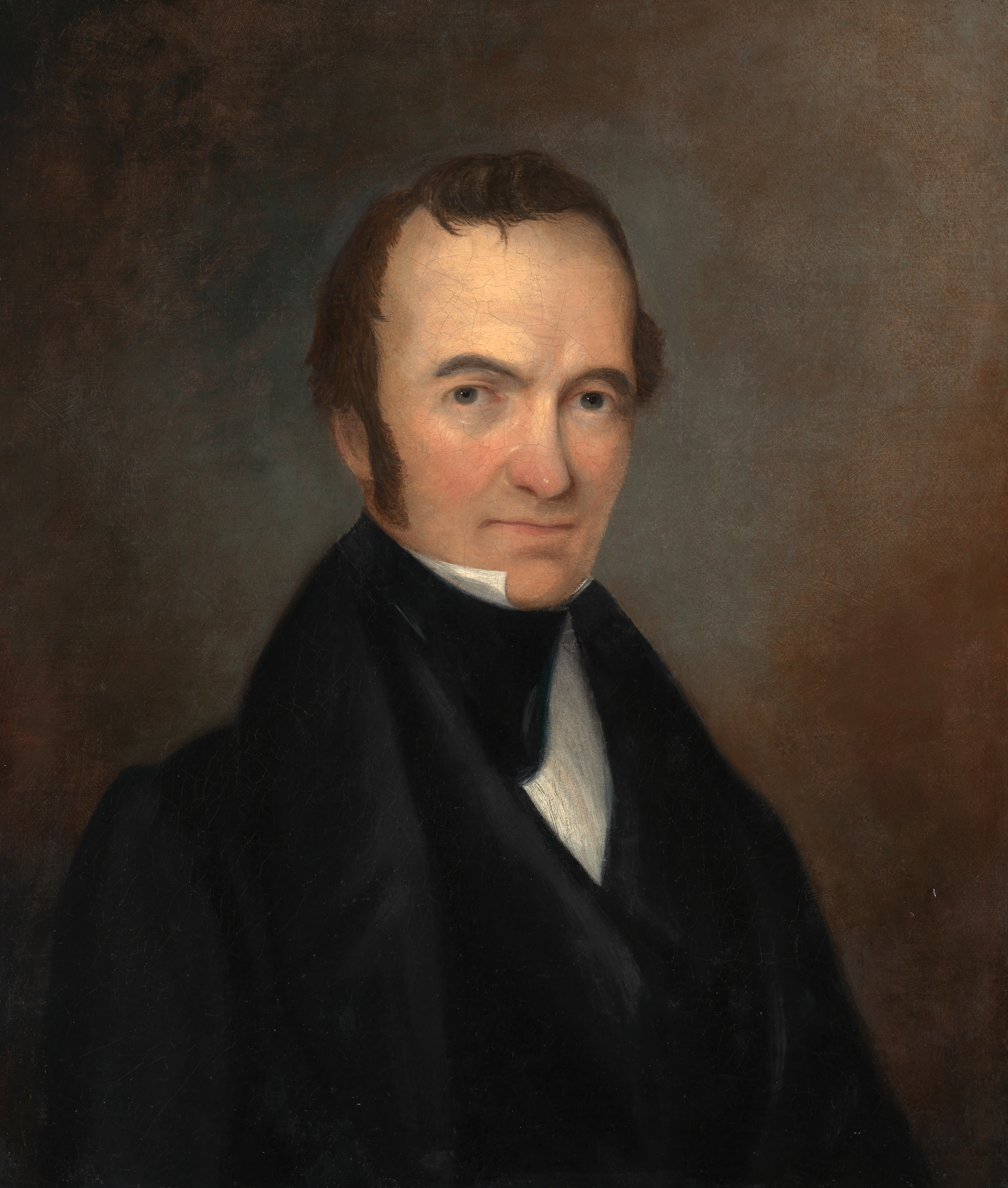
Nominee	Sam Houston	Henry Smith	Stephen F. Austin
Party	Nonpartisan	Nonpartisan	Nonpartisan
Popular vote	4,374	743	587
Percentage	76.7%	13.0%	10.3%
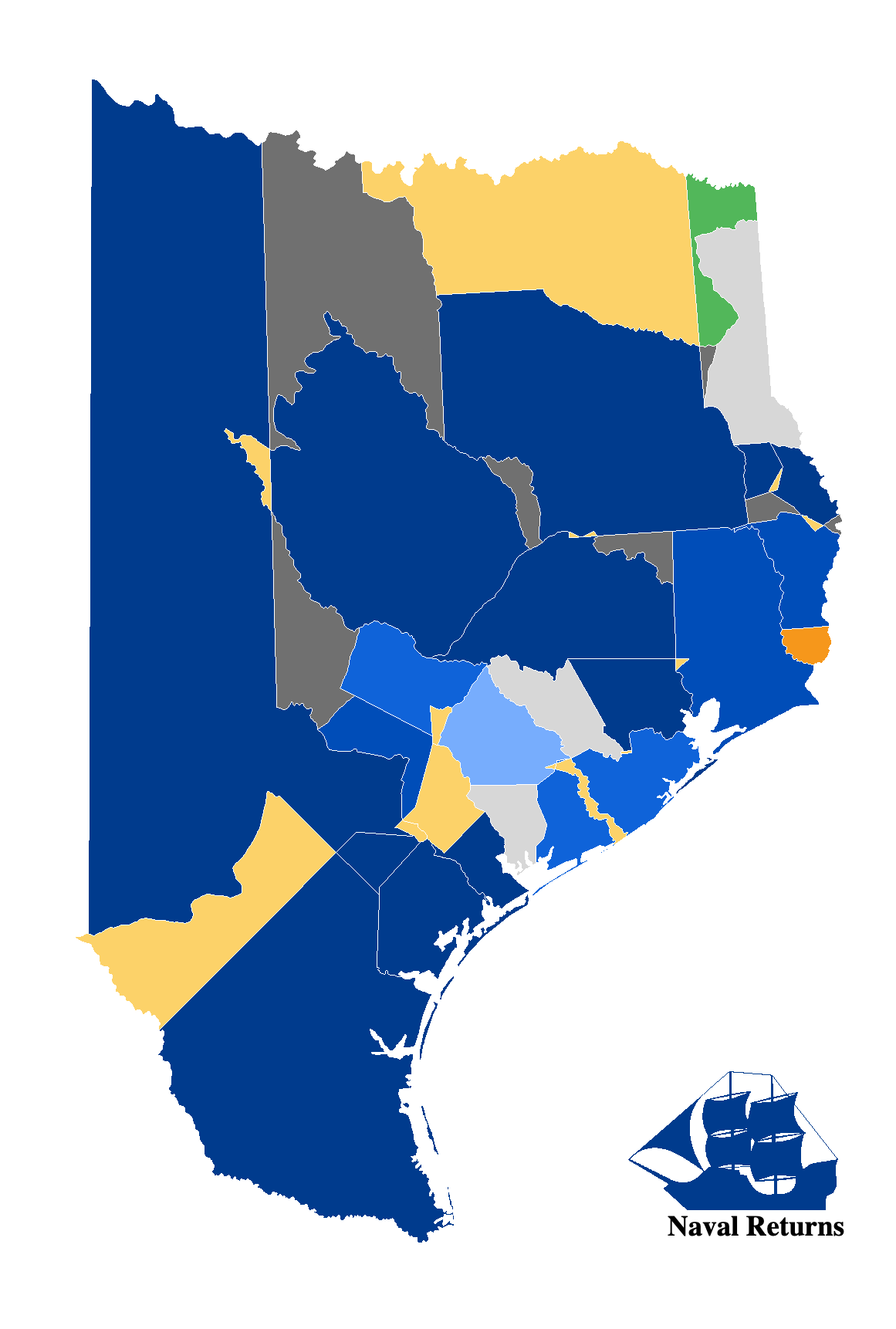
- Results by county (Note: These results were found from records kept in the Texas State Archive building in Austin, Texas.) Houston 50–60% 70–80% 80–90% 90–100% Austin 50–60% Green (Note: According to the results from the Texas State Archives, an unknown man with the surname "Green" won Red River county by 1 vote, it is speculated that this is someone by the name of Silas J. Green based on the handwriting, but this can not be conclusively proven.) 50–60% Unknown/No County (Note: During the first year of Texas Independence, vast swaths of land weren't claimed by any of her counties, leaving them without jurisdiction, these parts of Texas are represented by dark grey.) Disputed Control (Note: During the first year of Texas Independence, vast swaths of land were claimed by multiple counties, making them disputed between two entities, these are represented by a light orange.)
President before election
David G. Burnet (interim)
Nonpartisan
Elected President
Samuel Houston
Nonpartisan

The 1836 Republic of Texas presidential election was the first such election in the newly established Republic of Texas. Popular war hero Samuel Houston was elected in a decisive victory over Henry Smith and Stephen F. Austin. Houston was inaugurated on October 22, 1836, replacing interim president David G. Burnet.

== Candidates ==
- Stephen F. Austin, Texan Commissioner to the United States
- Samuel Houston, Commander-in-Chief of the Texian Army
- Henry Smith, Governor of the Provisional Government

== Campaign ==
Prior to Houston's entrance into the race, Stephen F. Austin considered himself to be the front-runner in the election to become the first president of Texas. His opponent in the race was Henry Smith, who had been governor of the Provisional Government and a delegate to the convention that declared the independence of the Republic of Texas. Others, however, had doubts about his qualifications. Austin was not widely known to most Texans, and his connections to land speculator Samuel May Williams had soiled his public reputation. When, eleven days before the election, Houston declared his candidacy, Austin's hopes of winning the presidency were sunk.

== Results ==
Houston won the election in a landslide, carrying 77% of the vote to Smith's 13% and Austin's 10%. Mirabeau Lamar was elected vice president by a majority of 2,699 votes.

1836 Texas presidential election
Party	Candidate	Votes	%
Nonpartisan	Sam Houston	4,374	76.7%
Nonpartisan	Henry Smith	743	13.0%
Nonpartisan	Stephen F. Austin	587	10.3%
Total votes		5,704	100.00%
