= List of places named for Sam Houston =

Sam Houston was an important figure in Texas history.

Places named in his honor include:

- Houston, Texas, the largest city in the state and fourth largest in the United States
- Houston, Mississippi
- Houston, Missouri
- Houston County, Minnesota
- Houston County, Tennessee
- Houston County, Texas
- Houston Street in New Haven, Connecticut
- Sam Houston Tollway in Houston, Texas
- Fort Sam Houston in San Antonio, Texas
- Sam Houston State University in Huntsville, Texas
- Several high schools named Sam Houston High School
- Sam Houston Elementary School in Maryville, Tennessee
- Sam Houston National Forest in Texas
- Sam Houston Coliseum in Houston, Texas
- Sam Houston Park in Houston, Texas
- Sam Houston Ship Channel Bridge, a bridge in Harris County, Texas
- Sam Houston Regional Library and Research Center in Liberty County, Texas
- Sam Houston Drive in Victoria, Texas
- Houston Highway (U.S. Route 59/future I-69) in Victoria, Texas

== See also ==
- United States Navy ships USS Sam Houston
- Sam Houston (disambiguation)
