= Henry Smith (Texas governor) =

American-born Governor of the Mexican territory of Texas

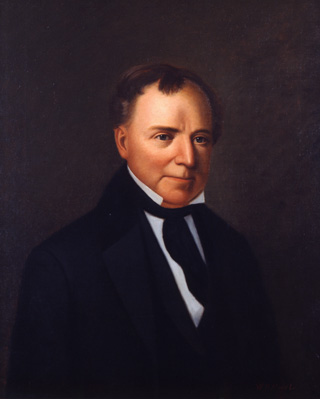

Governor of Texas Provisional Government
- In office 14 November 1835 – 1 March 1836
- Preceded by: José Rafael Eça y Múzquiz
- Succeeded by: James W. Robinson

Personal details
- Born: May 20, 1788 Bryantsville, Garrard County, Kentucky, US
- Died: March 4, 1851 (aged 62) Los Angeles County, California, US
- Spouse: Harriet Gillette (m. 1815; died 1820) Elizabeth Harriet (m. 1822; died 1833) Sarah Harriet (m. 1839)
- Children: William Watt, John Gillette, James Evans, Harriet G., Jane, Sarah, Emily, Sophronia, Elizabeth
- Parent(s): James Smith (Father); Magdalen Woods (Mother)
- Military career
- Allegiance: Republic of Texas
- Branch: Texian Army
- Rank: Colonel
- Conflicts: Texas Revolution; Battle of Velasco (WIA); Battle of Goliad; Battle of San Jacinto

Henry Smith (May 20, 1788 – March 4, 1851) was the first American-born Governor of the Mexican territory of Texas and briefly presided over the revolution there. He is one of 4 governors (three governors of Kentucky, one governor of Texas) from Garrard County, Kentucky, a historically Whig and Republican county located in Kentucky's Bluegrass region.

== Early life ==
Smith was born the tenth and last child of James and Magdalen (Woods) Smith of Bryantsville, Garrard County. At the age of 21, he became a merchant in Nashville, Tennessee, and married. Moving from place to place, he was ultimately attracted by land grants offered by the Mexican government and took his family to Brazoria County, Texas in 1827 where he worked his lands, taught school, and did some land surveying.

He became involved in politics and was wounded in the 1832 Battle of Velasco. Elected alcalde of Brazoria in 1833, he was soon chosen a delegate to the Convention of 1833. In 1834, he was appointed by the Mexican governor as the political chief of the department of the Brazos.

== Texas Independence ==
Around 1835, Smith became a leader in the party favoring independence for Texas, called the War, or Independence Party. This party met with the Peace Party at a convention in 1836 called the Consultation. There, these two parties debated whether to declare immediate independence from Mexico, or not. While urging an immediate declaration of independence, he helped prepare the organic law that served as the constitution of a provisional government. Smith was named governor of the provisional government but soon was locked in struggles with rivals both political and personal. He threatened to dissolve the provisional government's council which retaliated by impeaching him. Smith refused to relinquish the governorship to James W. Robinson but the matter was rendered moot by the Convention of 1836.

He ran against Sam Houston and Stephen Austin in the 1836 presidential election, but was soundly defeated by Houston, though he did edge out Austin. Smith was appointed by Houston to serve as his Secretary of the Treasury during his first administration. Later he promoted development along the Texas Gulf Coast. In 1840 he was elected to the Fifth Congress of the Republic of Texas, serving in the House of Representatives, though he retired after just one term. He never sought another public office.

He joined the California Gold Rush of 1849, but found no gold. He died in the mining camp he developed in Los Angeles County, California with his sons and was buried nearby. Later efforts to repatriate his body to Texas failed. At the dedication of his portrait in the Texas State Capitol, the tribute paid to him reminded listeners that "California stands vigil over his dust and Texas is the guardian of his fame."

== Personal life ==
Smith married Harriet Gillette in 1815; they had three sons: William Watt, and the twins John Gillette and James Evans. They moved to Missouri where Harriet died in 1820. In 1822, Smith married Harriet's sister, Elizabeth; they had five daughters: Harriet G., Jane, Sarah, Emily and Sophronia. They moved to Texas in 1827, where Elizabeth died of cholera in 1833. In 1839, Smith married Elizabeth's twin Sarah. They had one daughter Elizabeth. Sarah died in Liberty, Texas in 1863.
