= 1841 Republic of Texas presidential election =

- September 6, 1841
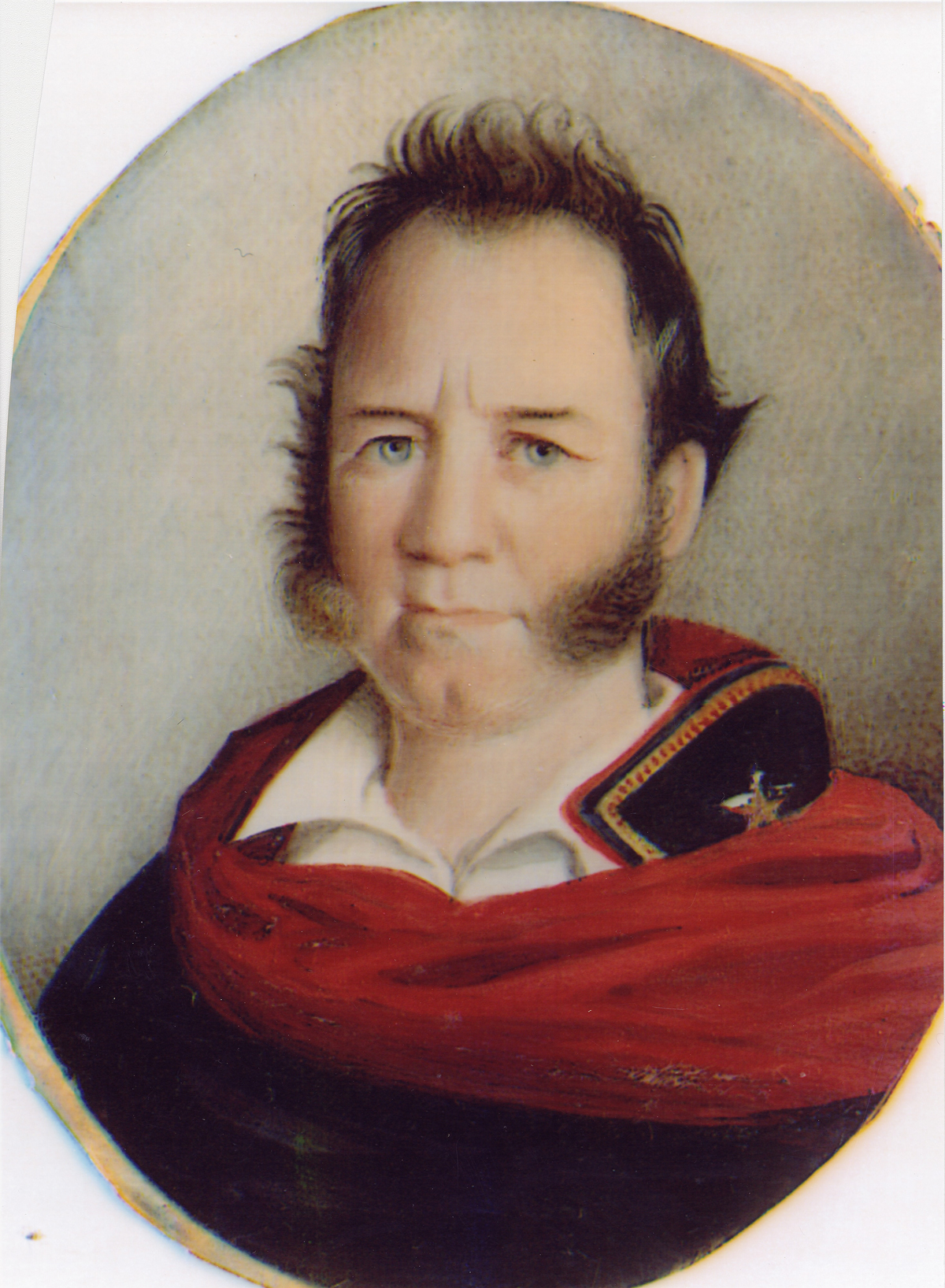

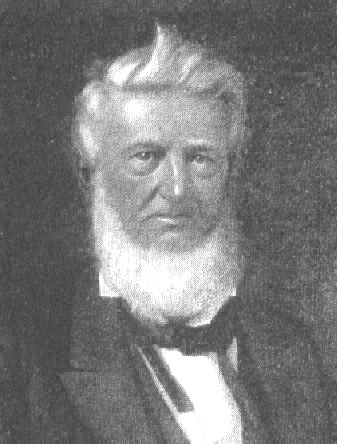
Nominee	Sam Houston	David G. Burnet
Party	Nonpartisan	Nonpartisan
Popular vote	7,915	3,616
Percentage	68.6%	31.4%
President before election
Mirabeau B. Lamar
Nonpartisan
Elected President
Sam Houston
Nonpartisan

The 1841 Republic of Texas presidential election was the third presidential election in the Republic of Texas. It was held on September 6, 1841. Former President Sam Houston defeated incumbent Vice President and former Interim President David G. Burnet to win a second non-consecutive term in office.

Edward Burleson was elected vice-president with 6,141 votes (58.6%) while his competitor Mennican Hunt received 4,336 votes (41.4%).
