= President of the Republic of Texas =

Head of state and head of government

- Seal of The Republic of Texas (1839–45)
- Term length: Three years, renewable but not immediately
- Precursor: Political Chief (Mexico)
- Formation: 16 March 1836 (Interim); 22 October 1836 (Constitutional)
- First holder: Sam Houston (David G. Burnet, Interim March–October 1836)
- Final holder: Anson Jones
- Succession: Governor of Texas

The president of the Republic of Texas (Spanish: Presidente de la República de Tejas) was the head of state and head of government while Texas was an independent republic between 1836 and 1845. The president served as the commander-in-chief of the Texas Military Forces.

== History and duties ==
Seals of the Republic of Texas

(1837–1839)

(1839–1845)

The Republic of Texas was formed in 1836. In the midst of the Texas Revolution, Texan settlers elected delegates to the Convention of 1836, which issued the Texas Declaration of Independence and elected David G. Burnet as interim president of the new country. In May 1836 Burnet and Mexican dictator Antonio López de Santa Anna, who was at the time a Texan prisoner-of-war, signed the Treaties of Velasco officially recognizing Texas's break from Mexico.

The authority and responsibilities of the president were similar to that of the president of the United States: to serve the people of Texas, and to serve as the head of the military and the state. These were detailed in the Constitution of the Republic of Texas of 1836. The Constitution specified a term of two years for the first elected president (Sam Houston) and terms of three years thereafter; the president could not succeed himself, but there were otherwise no term limits. The president was elected separately from the vice president, by popular vote, and there was no requirement to be native-born. A strict reading of the Constitution provided for women's suffrage (that is, both men and women were citizens and could vote for Congress, president, and other offices), but women and preachers or priests were not allowed to serve as president or in Congress. Indians and Africans and those of African descent could not be citizens.

The president lived in different towns during the life of the Republic, as the capital was relocated, especially during and immediately after the Texas Revolution. Washington-on-the-Brazos was Texas' first capital in 1836 (provisional), followed quickly by Harrisburg 1836 (provisional), Galveston 1836 (provisional), Velasco 1836 (provisional), Columbia 1836–37, Houston, 1837–39, and finally Austin, the modern capital, 1839–46.

The position was abolished with the annexation of Texas, largely due to President Anson Jones, who received the nickname "The architect of Annexation" and served only one year and three months. The amount of power wielded by occupants of the office varied tremendously during the nine years of Texas' independence. Particularly in the beginning, there was a larger military need than in the 1840s, and the president therefore had considerably more power and influence than during years of relative peace. No record is known, however, of any president violating or changing the Texas Constitution.

As the United States and other countries such as France recognized Texan independence, presidential power functioned without interference from the outside world, although the Republic generally allied itself informally with the United States. Several presidents supported annexation of the republic by the United States, with direct admission as a state.

Under the Constitution the vice president was to succeed the president in the event of the latter's death, resignation or removal by impeachment, but this never happened. The vice president was also the president of the Senate, and had a casting vote in the event of a tie.

== Oath of office ==
The oath or affirmation of office for the president was established in the Constitution of the Republic of Texas and was mandatory for a president 'before entering upon the duties' of the office. The wording, very similar to that of the United States' version, was prescribed by Article VI of the Constitution, as follows:

"I, A. B., President of the Republic of Texas, do solemnly and sincerely swear [or affirm, as the case may be] that I will faithfully execute the duties of my office, and to the best of my ability preserve, protect, and defend the Constitution of the Republic."

== List of presidents and vice presidents ==
| No. | President | Took office | Left office | Tenure | Election | Vice President |
|---|---|---|---|---|---|---|
| – | David G. Burnet (1788–1870); Interim | March 17, 1836 | October 22, 1836 | 220 days | – | Lorenzo de Zavala |
| 1 | Sam Houston (1793–1863); 1st time | October 22, 1836 | December 10, 1838 | 2 years, 49 days | 1836 | Mirabeau B. Lamar |
| 2 | Mirabeau B. Lamar (1798–1859) | December 10, 1838 | December 13, 1841 | 3 years, 3 days | 1838 | David G. Burnet |
| 3 | Sam Houston (1793–1863); 2nd time | December 13, 1841 | December 9, 1844 | 2 years, 362 days | 1841 | Edward Burleson |
| 4 | Anson Jones (1798–1858) | December 9, 1844 | December 19, 1846 | 2 years, 10 days | 1844 | Kenneth Lewis Anderson |
| 4 | Anson Jones (1798–1858) | December 9, 1844 | December 19, 1846 | 2 years, 10 days | 1844 | Vacant after July 3, 1845 |
Texas annexed by the United States; position abolished
