= Enrico Cerracchio =

Italian-American sculptor and painter (1880–1956)

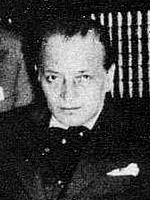
- Cerracchio in 1933
- Born: Enrico Filiberto Cerracchio; March 14, 1880; Castelvetere in Val Fortore, Italy
- Died: March 20, 1956 (aged 76); New York City, US
- Occupations: Sculptor, painter
- Children: 2

Enrico Filiberto Cerracchio (March 14, 1880 – March 20, 1956) was an Italian-born American sculptor and painter. Active in Houston, he designed the Sam Houston Monument.

== Biography ==
Cerracchio was born on March 14, 1880, in Castelvetere in Val Fortore, the son of civil engineer Memnato Cerracchio and Joseppa (née Alterisio) Cerracchio. He studied academics and sculpture at the Avellino Institute, graduating in 1898, after which he studied art under Raffaele Belliazzi. In 1900, he moved to Houston, in the United States, becoming a citizen of the country in 1905.

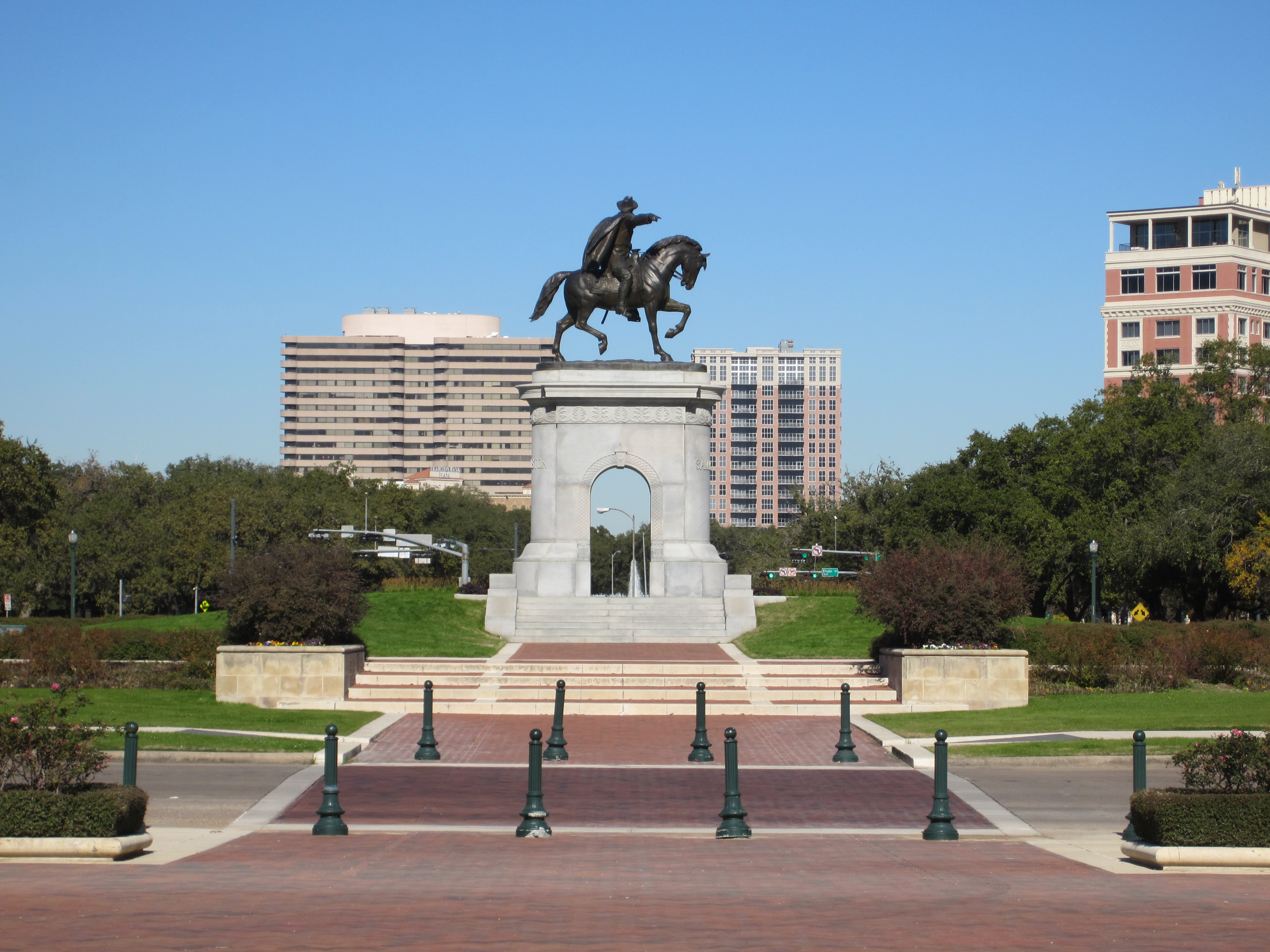
Sam Houston Monument (1924)

Cerracchio's sculptures were primarily of American figures, in which the sculpture's subject was characterized as heroic and charismatic. He primarily sculpted using marble and bronze. After World War I, he made sculptures of Italian general Armando Diaz and of American general John J. Pershing; the sculptures were accepted by the Italian government and the Houston municipal government, respectively. In 1924, he created the equestrian Sam Houston Monument, which stands in Hermann Park. The statue points to where the Battle of San Jacinto was fought.

In 1924, Cerracchio created a bust of Governor Miriam A. Ferguson, which sits in the Texas State Capitol. He designed busts for others, including Albert Einstein, Vice President John Nance Garner, businessman Jesse H. Jones, actor Rudolph Valentino, and general John A. Wharton. Later in his career, he acquired an art studio in New York City.

In 1907, Cerracchio married Marion Kowalski; they had two children together.

He emigrated to the United States in 1900, and he became a U.S. citizen in 1905. He died on March 20, 1956, aged 76, in New York City. His funeral was held at Our Lady of Mercy's Church in The Bronx.
