= Sam Houston =

American general and statesman (1793–1863)

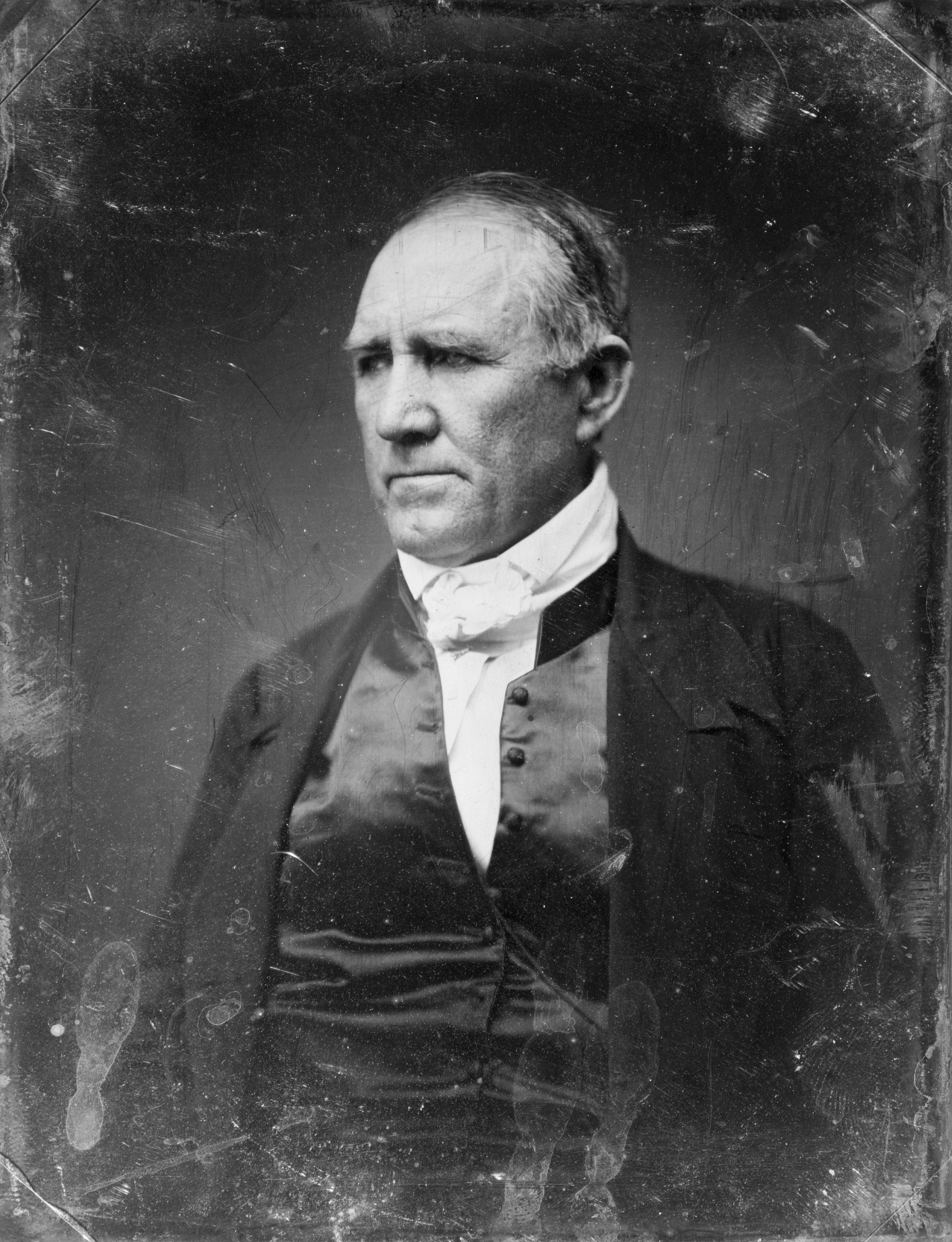
- Portrait by Matthew Brady Studio, c. 1848–1850

7th Governor of Texas
- In office December 21, 1859 – March 15, 1861
- Lieutenant: Edward Clark
- Preceded by: Hardin Richard Runnels
- Succeeded by: Edward Clark

United States Senator from Texas
- In office February 21, 1846 – March 3, 1859
- Preceded by: Seat established
- Succeeded by: John Hemphill

1st & 3rd President of Texas
- In office December 21, 1841 – December 9, 1844
- Vice President: Edward Burleson
- Preceded by: Mirabeau B. Lamar
- Succeeded by: Anson Jones
- In office October 22, 1836 – December 10, 1838
- Vice President: Mirabeau B. Lamar
- Preceded by: David G. Burnet (acting)
- Succeeded by: Mirabeau B. Lamar

Member of the Texas House of Representatives from the San Augustine district
- In office November 11, 1839 – November 1, 1841
- Preceded by: Multi-member district
- Succeeded by: Multi-member district

6th Governor of Tennessee
- In office October 1, 1827 – April 16, 1829
- Lieutenant: William Hall
- Preceded by: William Carroll
- Succeeded by: William Hall

Member of the U.S. House of Representatives from Tennessee's 7th district
- In office March 4, 1823 – March 3, 1827
- Preceded by: Constituency established
- Succeeded by: John Bell

Personal details
- Born: Samuel Houston; March 2, 1793 Rockbridge, Virginia, U.S.
- Died: July 26, 1863 (aged 70) Huntsville, Texas, C.S.
- Resting place: Oakwood Cemetery, Huntsville, Texas, U.S.
- Party: Democratic-Republican (before 1830); Democratic (1846–1854); Know Nothing (1855–1856); Independent (1856–1863); Constitutional Union Party (1860)
- Spouses: Eliza Allen (m. 1829; div. 1837) Dianna Rogers (m. 1830; ann. 1832) Margaret Lea (m. 1840)
- Children: 8, including Sam Jr., Andrew, and Temple
- Nickname(s): “The Raven”, (Note: He acquired the moniker "Colonneh" during his time residing with the Cherokee Nation, following Sam's departure from his familial residence.) “Old Sam Jacinto”

Military service
- Allegiance: United States; Republic of Texas
- Branch/service: United States Army; Texan Army
- Years of service: 1813–1818 (U.S. Army); 1835–1836 (Texan Army)
- Rank: First Lieutenant (U.S. Army); Major General (Texan Army)
- Unit: 39th Infantry Regiment (U.S. Army)
- Commands: Army of the Republic of Texas (Texan Army)
- Battles/wars: War of 1812; Creek War; Battle of Horseshoe Bend; Texas Revolution; Battle of San Jacinto

Samuel Houston (/ˈhjuːstɪn/, HEW-stən; March 2, 1793 – July 26, 1863) was an American military general and statesman who played a prominent role in the Texas Revolution in which the Republic of Texas seceded from Mexico. He served as the first and third president of the Republic of Texas and then one of the first two United States Senators from Texas after it was annexed as a U.S. state. Prior to this, he served as the sixth governor of Tennessee, and later, as the seventh governor of Texas, the only individual elected governor of two different U.S. states.

Sam Houston was born in Rockbridge County, Virginia to a slave-owning family and owned slaves throughout his life. The family moved to Maryville, Tennessee, while he was a teenager. Houston ran away from home to live some three years in a Cherokee village, becoming known as "Raven". He served under General Andrew Jackson in the War of 1812, and was appointed as a sub-agent to oversee the removal of the Cherokee from Tennessee into Arkansas Territory in 1818. With the support of Jackson and others, Houston was elected to the House of Representatives in 1823. He strongly supported Jackson's presidential candidacies and, in 1827, was elected governor of Tennessee. In 1829, after divorcing his first wife, he resigned and moved to the Arkansas Territory to live with the Cherokee again.

In 1832, Houston settled in Mexican Texas, amidst rising tensions between U.S. immigrants and the Centralist government of Mexico. After the 1835 Battle of Gonzales, he rose to prominence in Texas's revolutionary government and the Texian Army, which he led in the decisive 1836 victory at San Jacinto. After the war, Houston won the 1836 Texan presidential election. He left office due to term limits in 1838, but won another term in the 1841 Texas presidential election. Houston supported the U.S. annexation of Texas, which finally took place in 1845. In 1846, he was elected to represent Texas in the U.S. Senate. He joined the Democratic Party and supported President James K. Polk's Mexican–American War, sparked by the annexation and resulting in the 1848 Mexican Cession of further vast territory forming the Southwestern United States.

Despite remaining a slave-owner, Houston's Senate record was marked by unionism and opposition to radicals from both the North and South. He voted for the Compromise of 1850, which settled disputes concerning the lands taken from Mexico, but against the Kansas–Nebraska Act of 1854, which he believed would increase tensions over slavery, later leaving the Democratic Party over the act. He unsuccessfully contested the presidential nomination of the American Party in the 1856 presidential election and of the Constitutional Union Party in the 1860 presidential election. In 1859, Houston was elected governor of Texas. In this role, he opposed Southern secession, unsuccessfully seeking to keep Texas out of the Confederate States at the start of the U.S. Civil War. The only Southern governor refusing an oath of allegiance to the Confederacy, Houston was forced out of office in 1861, and died at his home in 1863. He has been honored in numerous ways. Houston, Texas, now the fourth-most-populous U.S city, was founded in his name in 1836 and, as still a small town, hosted his own first presidency until 1838.

== Early life ==
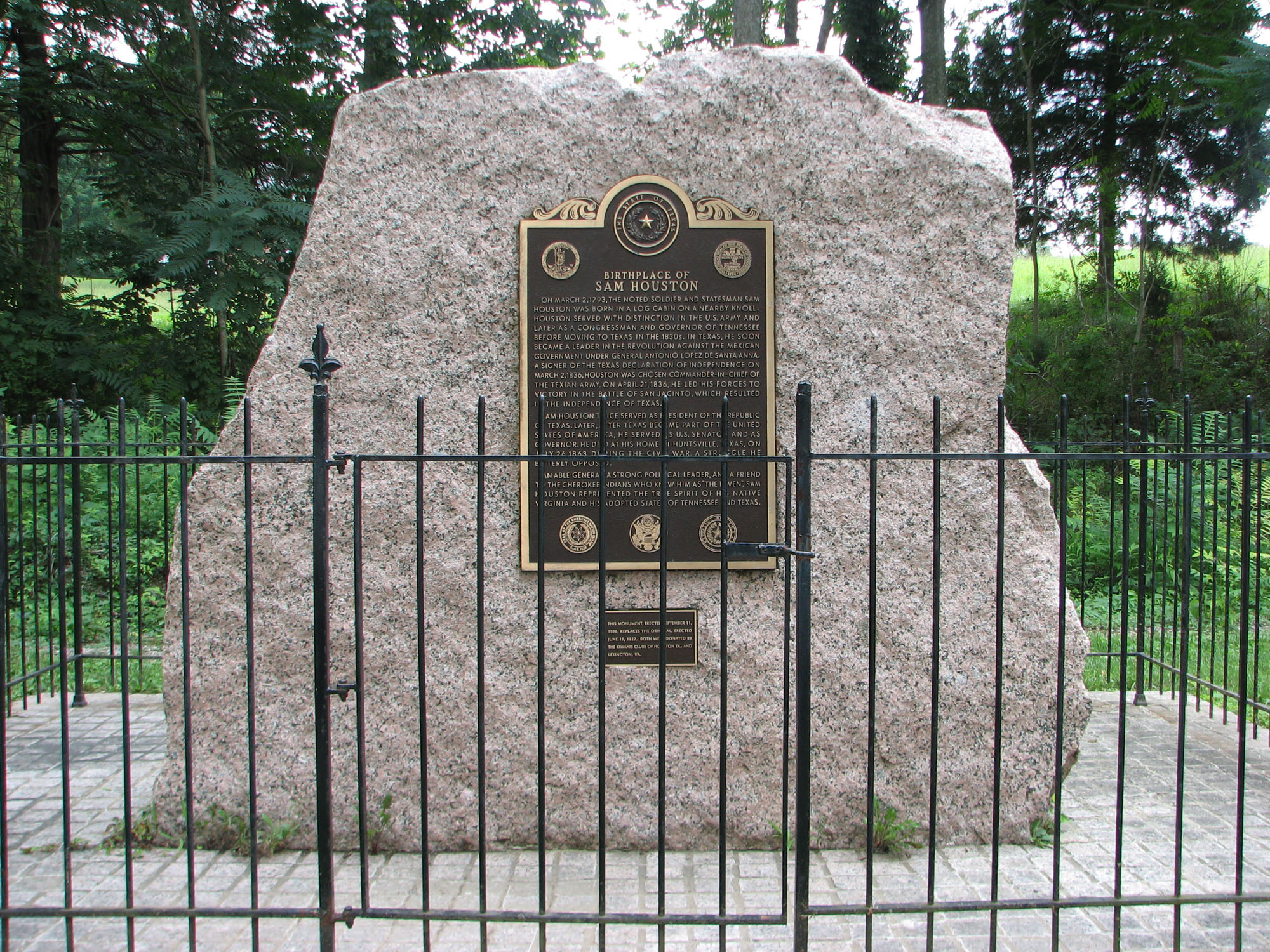
Sam Houston Birthplace Marker in Rockbridge County, Virginia

Samuel Houston was born in Rockbridge County, Virginia on March 2, 1793, to Samuel Houston and Elizabeth Paxton. Both of Houston's parents were descended from Scottish and Irish colonists who had settled in Colonial America in the 1730s, including his great-grandfather John Houston. Houston's father was descended from Ulster Scots people and the Houston baronets, the founders of Clan Houston in Scotland. (Note: Houston descended from Sir John Houston; who, in the late 1600s, rebuilt the Houston baronial estate, Houston House, Renfrewshire, near Johnstone and Bridge of Weir, Scotland. From him came John Houston and Margaret Mary (née Cunningham) Houston, who lived for some time in Ireland; in 1735, they emigrated to America, ending up on the Timber Ridge plantation.) (Note: Houston's uncle, the Presbyterian Rev. Samuel Houston, was an elected member of the "lost" State of Franklin then in the western frontier of North Carolina, who advocated for the passage of his proposed "A Declaration of Rights or Form of Government on the Constitution of the Commonwealth of Frankland" at the convention that was assembled in Greeneville, Tennessee on November 14, 1785. Rev. Houston returned to Rockbridge County, Virginia after the assembled State of Franklin convention rejected his constitutional proposal.) Samuel inherited the Timber Ridge plantation and mansion in Rockbridge County, Virginia, which was worked by enslaved Africans. During the American Revolutionary War, Captain Houston served in Morgan's Rifle Brigade as a paymaster. He served in the Virginian militia, which required him to pay his own expenses and to be away from his family for long periods of time. Thus, the plantation and his family's finances suffered.

He had five brothers and three sisters: Paxton, Robert, James (married Patience Bills), John, William (married Mary Ball), Isabella, Mary (married Matthew Wallace), and Eliza (married Samuel Moore).

His father, Samuel Sr., planned to sell Timber Ridge (Note: After the Houstons migrated west to Tennessee, Timber Ridge was razed and Church Hill was built on the site.) and move west to Tennessee, where land was less expensive, but he died in 1806. Elizabeth, his mother, followed through on those plans, settling the family near Maryville, Tennessee, the seat of Blount County. At that time, Tennessee was on the American frontier, and even larger towns like Nashville were vigilant against Native American raids. He had dozens of cousins who lived in the surrounding area of east-central Tennessee. When they arrived, Elizabeth cleared the land, built a house, and planted crops. Her oldest children, Paxton, Isabella, and Robert died within a few years after they arrived in Tennessee. Elizabeth relied on James and John to run the store in Maryville, to operate the farm, and to watch over the younger children.

Houston had a carefree disposition, however, and liked to escape to explore the frontier. He was at odds with the concepts of hell and damnation preached by his mother's religion, Presbyterianism, and he was not interested in schooling. However, he did take an interest in his father's library, reading works by classical authors like Virgil, as well as more contemporary works by authors such as Jedidiah Morse.

=== Life after his father's passing ===
After his father's passing in 1807 and his lack of interest in farming and working in the family store, at the age of 16, he ran away from his family and his home to live with a Cherokee tribe, led by Chief John Jolly (Cherokee name: Ahuludegi, also spelled Oolooteka) on Hiwassee Island. During the time that Sam Houston spent with the Cherrokee Indians, he was taught their language, skills, and customs. This helped Houston develop a special relationship with the Indians, thus gaining their trust. Houston formed a close relationship with Jolly and learned the Cherokee language, becoming known as 'Raven.' During his time with the Cherokee, Houston learned their language, adopted many of their customs, and maintained close ties with the tribe throughout his life. According to James L. Haley, he appreciated the "free and unsophisticated spiritual expression of the Native Americans." He left the tribe to return to Maryville in 1812, and he was hired at age 19 for a term as the schoolmaster of a one-room schoolhouse. He attended Porter Academy, where he was taught by Rev. Isaac L. Anderson, founder of Maryville College. It's thought that he attended Maryville College, but that hasn't been confirmed.

According to biographer John Hoyt Williams, Houston was not close with his siblings or his parents, and he rarely spoke of them in his later life. Haley states that he was interested in his younger brother's and his sisters' welfare when he lived on Hiwassee Island. He felt used by the rest of the family.

Houston had a few women that were prominent in his life. His first marriage to Eliza Allen ended in scandal and divorce. He had a relationship with a Cherokee woman named Tiana Rodgers, with whom he lived before his divorce from Allen. His final wife was Margaret Moffette Lea, who was twenty years his junior.

== War of 1812 and aftermath ==
On March 24, 1813, Houston enlisted in the army at the young age of 20 in the War of 1812 against Britain and Britain's Native American allies. He quickly impressed the commander of the 39th Infantry Regiment, Thomas Hart Benton, and by the end of 1813, Houston had risen to the rank of third lieutenant. In early 1814, the 39th Infantry Regiment became a part of the force commanded by General Andrew Jackson, who was charged with putting an end to raids by a faction of the Muscogee (or "Creek") tribe in the Old Southwest. Houston was wounded badly in the Battle of Horseshoe Bend, the decisive battle in the Creek War. Although army doctors expected him to die of his wounds, Houston survived and convalesced in Maryville and other locations. While many other officers lost their positions after the end of the War of 1812 due to military cutbacks, Houston retained his commission with the help of Congressman John Rhea. During that time he was promoted to the rank of second lieutenant.

Sometime in early 1817, Sam Houston was assigned to a clerical position in Nashville, serving under the adjutant general for the army's Southern Division. Later in the year, Jackson appointed Houston as a sub-agent to handle the removal of Cherokee from East Tennessee. Missionary Cyrus Kingsbury, who actively opposed Cherokee removal for decades, described Houston in late 1817 as "an officious man 'much engaged to get the Indians away from their country'." In February 1818, he received a strong reprimand from the Secretary of War John C. Calhoun after he wore Native American dress to a meeting between Calhoun and Cherokee leaders, beginning an enmity that lasted until Calhoun died in 1850. Angry over the incident with Calhoun and an investigation into his activities, Houston resigned from the army in 1818. He continued to act as a government liaison with the Cherokee, and in 1818, he helped some of the Cherokee resettle in Arkansas Territory.

== Early political career ==
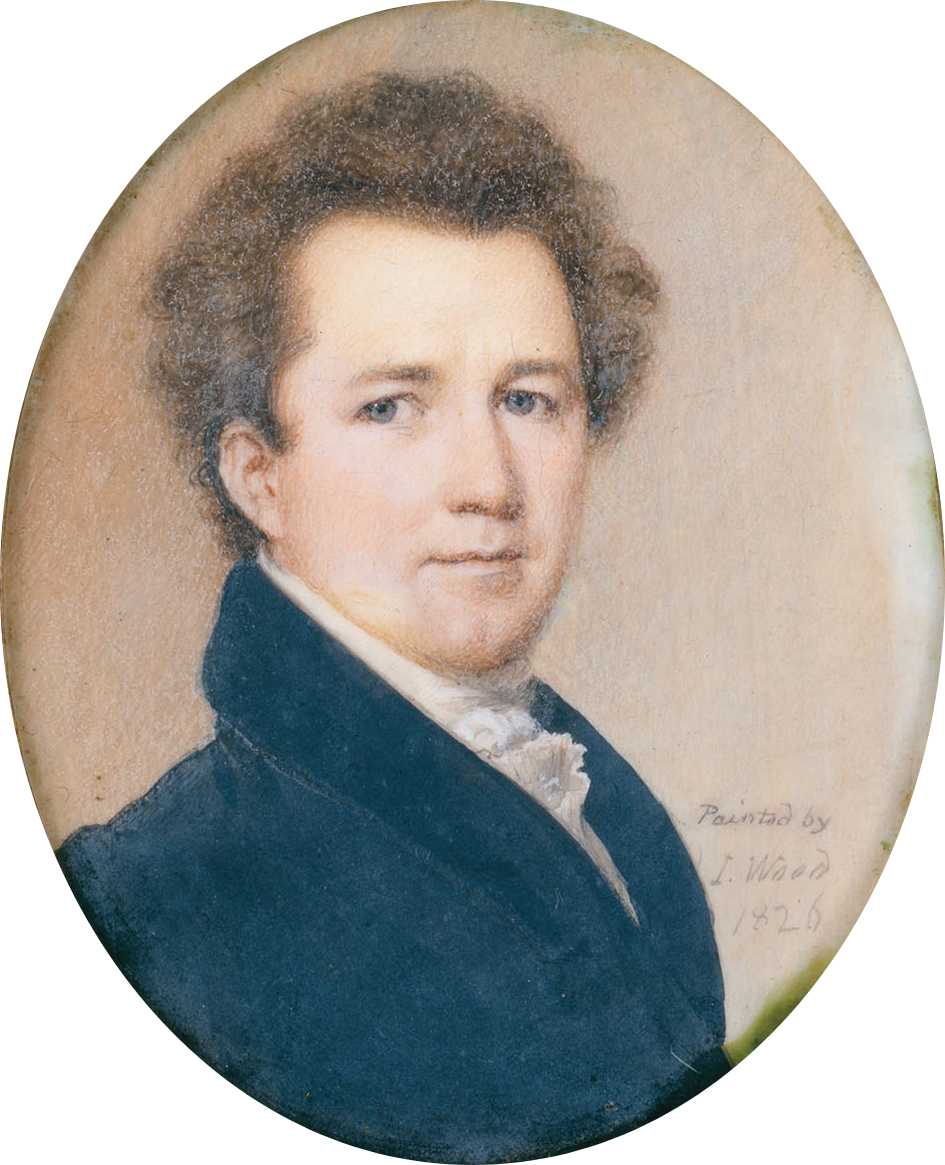
The earliest known likeness of Houston, painted in 1826 during his Congressional tenure

After leaving government service, Houston began an apprenticeship with Judge James Trimble in Nashville. After leaving the military, Houston studied law in Tennessee. His reputation as a public speaker and his close association with Andrew Jackson helped launch his early political career before he was admitted to the state bar and opened a legal practice in Lebanon, Tennessee. With the aid of Governor Joseph McMinn, Houston won election as the district attorney for Nashville in 1819. He was also appointed as a major general of the Tennessee militia. Like his mentors, Houston was a member of the Democratic-Republican Party, which dominated state and national politics in the decade following the War of 1812. Tennessee gained three seats in the United States House of Representatives after the 1820 United States census, and, with the support of Jackson and McMinn, Houston ran unopposed in the 1823 election for Tennessee's 9th congressional district. In his first major speech in Congress, Houston advocated for the recognition of Greece, which was fighting a war of independence against the Ottoman Empire.

Houston strongly supported Jackson's candidacy in the 1824 presidential election, which saw four major candidates, all from the Democratic-Republican Party, run for president. As no candidate won a majority of the vote, the House of Representatives held a contingent election, which was won by John Quincy Adams. Supporters of Jackson eventually coalesced into the Democratic Party, and those who favored Adams became known as National Republicans. With Jackson's backing, Houston won election as governor of Tennessee in 1827. Governor Houston advocated the construction of internal improvements such as canals, and sought to lower the price of land for homesteaders living in the public domain. He also aided Jackson's successful campaign in the 1828 presidential election.

On September 22, 1826, he severely wounded General William A. White in a pistol duel near Franklin, Kentucky, over the patronage political appointment of Nashville's Postmaster.

In January 1829, Houston married Eliza Allen, the daughter of wealthy plantation owner John Allen of Gallatin, Tennessee. The marriage quickly fell apart, possibly because Eliza loved another man. In April 1829, following the collapse of his marriage, Houston resigned as governor of Tennessee. Shortly after leaving office, he traveled to Arkansas Territory to rejoin the Cherokee.

== Political exile and controversy ==
Houston was reunited with Ahuludegi's group of Cherokee in mid-1829. Because of Houston's government experience and connections with President Jackson, several local Native American tribes asked Houston to mediate disputes and communicate their needs to the Jackson administration. In late 1829, the Cherokee accorded Houston tribal membership and dispatched him to Washington to negotiate several issues. In anticipation of the removal of the remaining Cherokee east of the Mississippi River, Houston unsuccessfully bid to supply rations to the Native Americans during their journey. When Houston returned to Washington in 1832, Congressman William Stanbery alleged that Houston had placed a fraudulent bid in 1830 in collusion with the Jackson administration. On April 13, 1832, after Stanbery refused to answer Houston's letters regarding the incident, Houston beat Stanbery with a cane. After the beating, the House of Representatives brought Houston to trial. By a vote of 106 to 89, the House convicted Houston, and Speaker of the House Andrew Stevenson formally reprimanded Houston. A federal court also required Houston to pay $500 in damages.

== Texas Revolution ==
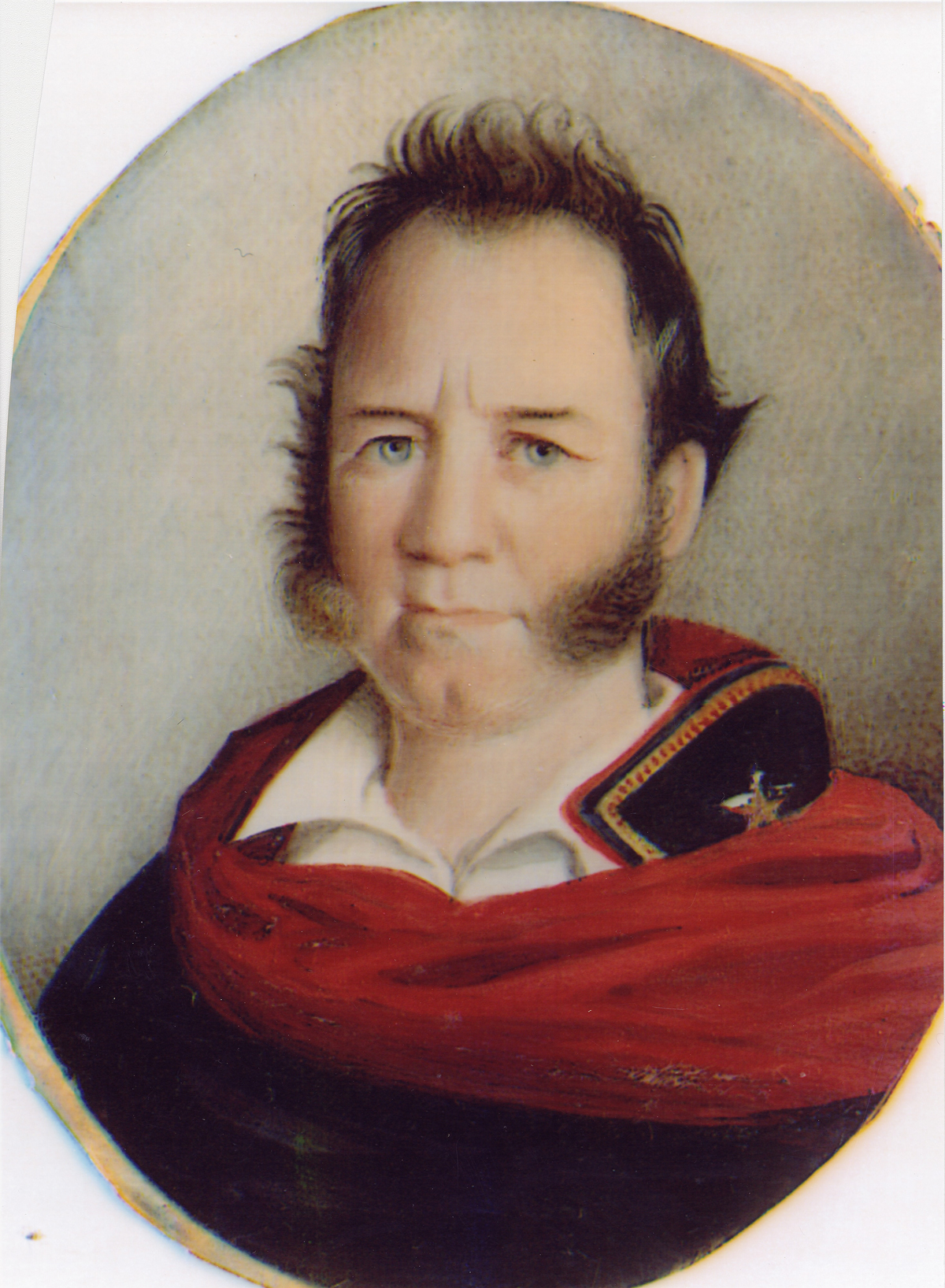
Painting of Houston from 1836

In mid-1832, Houston's friends William H. Wharton and John Austin Wharton wrote to convince him to travel to the Mexican possession of Texas, where unrest among the American settlers was growing. The Mexican government had invited Americans to settle the sparsely populated region of Texas, but many of the settlers, including the Whartons, disliked Mexican rule. Houston crossed into Texas in December 1832, and shortly thereafter, he was granted land in Texas. Houston was elected to represent Nacogdoches, Texas, at the Convention of 1833, which was called to petition Mexico for statehood (at the time, Texas was part of the state of Coahuila y Tejas). Houston strongly supported statehood, and he chaired a committee that drew a proposed state constitution. After the convention, Texan leader Stephen F. Austin petitioned the Mexican government for statehood, but he was unable to come to an agreement with President Valentín Gómez Farías. In 1834, Antonio López de Santa Anna assumed the presidency, took on new powers, and arrested Austin. In October 1835, the Texas Revolution broke out with the Battle of Gonzales, a skirmish between Texan forces and the Mexican Army. Shortly after the battle, Houston was elected to the Consultation, a congregation of Texas leaders.

Along with Austin and others, Houston helped organize the Consultation into a provisional government for Texas. In November, Houston joined with most other delegates in voting for a measure that demanded Texas statehood and the restoration of the 1824 Constitution of Mexico. The Consultation appointed Houston as a major general and the highest-ranking officer of the Texian Army, though the appointment did not give him effective control of the militia units that constituted the Texian Army. Houston helped organize the Convention of 1836, where the Republic of Texas declared independence from Mexico, and appointed him as Commander-in-Chief of the Texas Army. Shortly after the declaration, the convention received a plea for assistance from William B. Travis, who commanded Texan forces under siege by Santa Anna at the Alamo. The convention confirmed Houston's command of the Texian Army and dispatched him to lead a relief of Travis's force, but the Alamo fell before Houston could organize his forces at Gonzales, Texas. Seeking to intimidate Texan forces into surrender, the Mexican army killed every defender at the Alamo; news of the defeat outraged many Texans and caused desertions in Houston's ranks. Commanding a force of about 350 men that numerically was inferior to that of Santa Anna, Houston retreated east across the Colorado River.

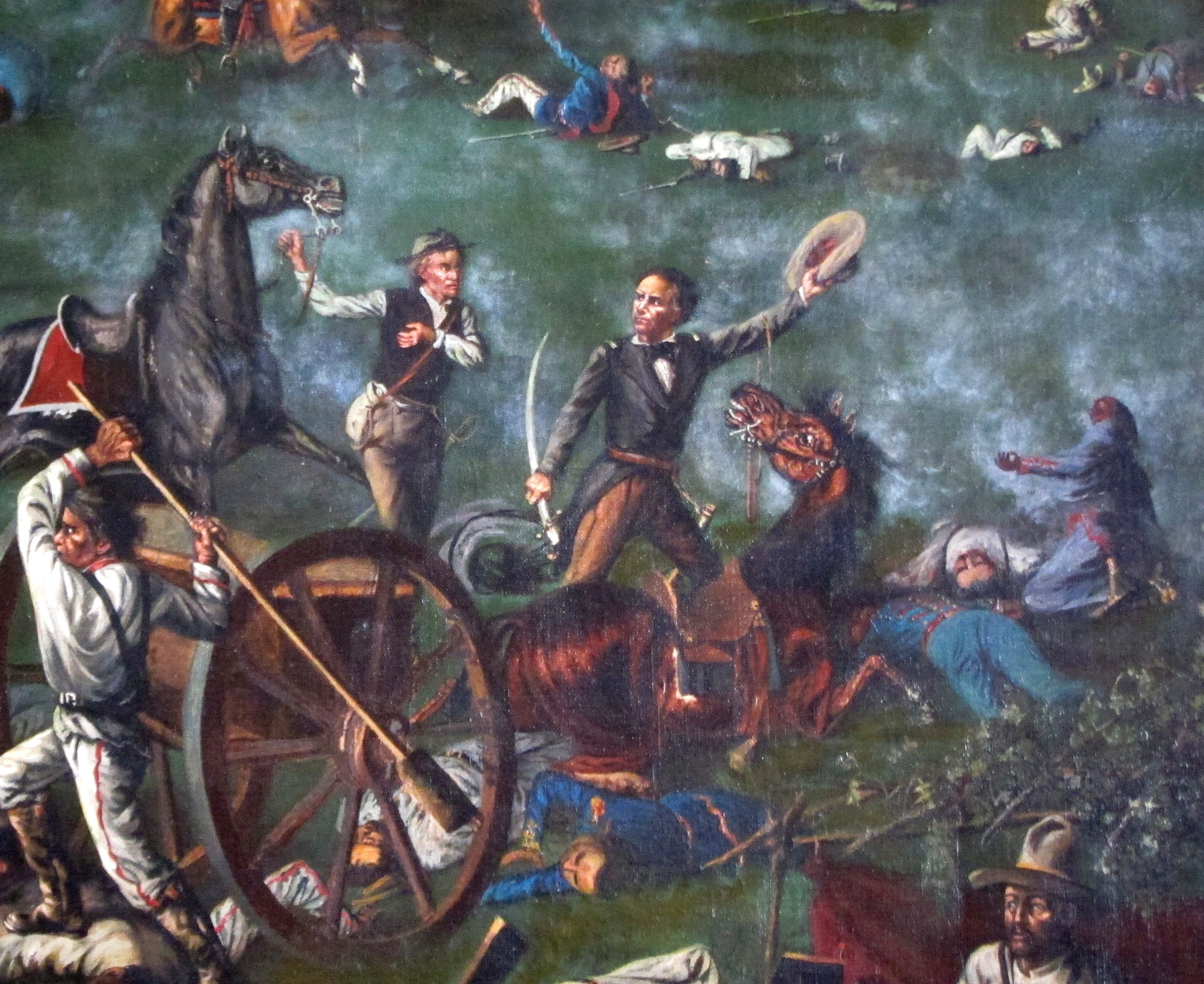
Detail from Houston at the Battle of San Jacinto by Henry Arthur McArdle

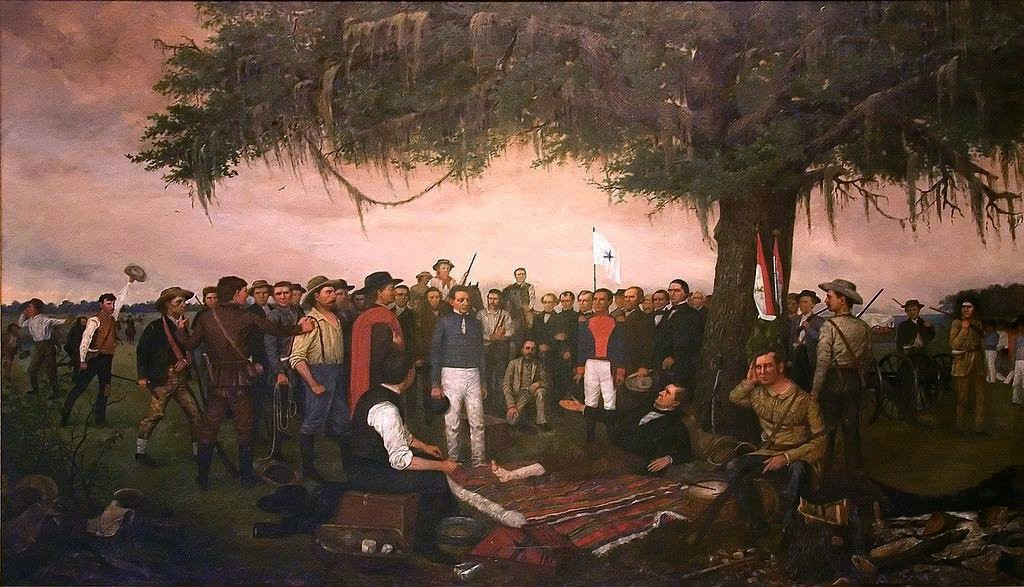
Surrender of Santa Anna by William Henry Huddle shows the Mexican general Santa Anna surrendering to a wounded Sam Houston. It hangs in the Texas State Capitol.

Though the provisional government, as well as many of his own subordinates, urged him to attack the Mexican army, Houston continued the retreat east, informing his soldiers that they constituted "the only army in Texas now present ... There are but a few of us, and if we are beaten, the fate of Texas is sealed." (Note: Another Texan force had been defeated at the Battle of Coleto; the Texans captured in that battle were subsequently massacred by order of Santa Anna.) Letters written by Houston during 1836 and 1837 reveal his emphasis on military discipline, supply organization, scouting operations, and defensive preparation during the Texas Revolution. Santa Anna divided his forces and finally caught up to Houston in mid-April 1836. Santa Anna's force of about 1,350 soldiers trapped Houston's force of 783 men in a marsh; rather than pressing the attack, Santa Anna ordered his soldiers to make camp. Upon hearing this, the Texian soldiers wanted to go out and fight. They were tired of retreating and wanted to do something instead of camping there. Even though Houston was hesitant about it, he let them take the reins and decide to attack. On April 21, Houston ordered an attack on the Mexican army, beginning the Battle of San Jacinto. The Texans quickly routed Santa Anna's force, though Houston's horse was shot out under him, and his ankle was shattered by a stray bullet. In the aftermath of the Battle of San Jacinto, a detachment of Texans captured Santa Anna. Santa Anna was forced to sign the Treaty of Velasco, which established a ceasefire between the two forces and laid out the first few steps towards Texan independence. Houston stayed briefly for negotiations, then returned to the United States for treatment of his ankle wound.

== President of Texas ==
The Republic of Texas after the Texas Revolution

Victory in the Battle of San Jacinto made Houston a hero to many Texans, and he won the 1836 Texas presidential election, defeating Stephen F. Austin, who would receive the honor of having the city of Austin named after him, and Henry Smith. Houston took office on October 22, 1836, after interim president David G. Burnet resigned. During the presidential election, the voters of Texas overwhelmingly indicated their desire for Texas to be annexed by the United States. Houston, meanwhile, faced the challenge of assembling a new government, putting the country's finances in order, and handling relations with Mexico. He selected Mirabeau Lamar as vice president, Thomas Jefferson Rusk as secretary of war, Smith as secretary of the treasury, Samuel Rhoads Fisher as secretary of the navy, James Collinsworth as attorney general, and Austin as secretary of state. (Note: After Austin died of an illness in December 1836, Houston ordered a month of mourning.) Houston sought normalized relations with Mexico, and despite some resistance from the legislature, arranged the release of Santa Anna. Concerned about upsetting the balance between slave states and free states, U.S. President Andrew Jackson refused to push for the annexation of Texas, but in his last official act in office he granted Texas diplomatic recognition. With the United States unwilling to annex Texas, Houston began courting British support; as part of this effort, he urged the end of the importation of slaves into Texas.

In early 1837, the government agreed to move to Houston, a city named after none other than Samuel himself. In 1838, Houston frequently clashed with Congress over issues such as a treaty with the Cherokee and a land-office act and was forced to put down the Córdova Rebellion, a plot to allow Mexico to reclaim Texas with aid from the Kickapoo Indians. The Texas constitution barred presidents from seeking a second term, so Houston did not stand for re-election in the 1838 election and left office in late 1838. He was succeeded by Mirabeau B. Lamar, who, along with Burnet, led a faction of Texas politicians opposed to Houston. The Lamar administration removed many of Houston's appointees, launched a war against the Cherokee, and established a new capital at Austin, Texas. Meanwhile, Houston opened a legal practice and co-founded a land company with the intent of developing the town of Sabine City. In 1839, he was elected to represent San Augustine County in the Texas House of Representatives.

Houston defeated Burnet in the 1841 Texas presidential election, winning a large majority of the vote. Houston appointed Anson Jones as secretary of state, Asa Brigham as secretary of the treasury, George Washington Hockley as secretary of war, and George Whitfield Terrell as attorney general. The republic faced a difficult financial situation; at one point, Houston commandeered an American brig used to transport Texas soldiers because the government could not afford to pay the brig's captain. The Santa Fe Expedition and other initiatives pursued by Lamar had stirred tensions with Mexico, and rumors frequently raised fears that Santa Anna would launch an invasion of Texas. Houston continued to curry favor with Britain and France, partly in the hope that British and French influence in Texas would encourage the United States to annex Texas. The Tyler administration made the annexation of Texas its chief foreign policy priority, and in April 1844, Texas and the United States signed an annexation treaty. Annexation did not have sufficient support in Congress, and the United States Senate rejected the treaty in June.

Henry Clay and Martin Van Buren, the respective front-runners for the Whig and Democratic nominations in the 1844 presidential election, both opposed the annexation of Texas. However, Van Buren's opposition to annexation damaged his candidacy, and he was defeated by James K. Polk, an acolyte of Jackson and an old friend of Houston, at the 1844 Democratic National Convention. Polk defeated Clay in the general election, giving backers of annexation an electoral mandate. Meanwhile, Houston's term ended in December 1844, and he was succeeded by Anson Jones, his secretary of state. In the waning days of his own presidency, Tyler used Polk's victory to convince Congress to approve of the annexation of Texas. Seeking Texas's immediate acceptance of annexation, Tyler made Texas a generous offer that allowed the state to retain control of its public lands, though it would be required to keep its public debt. A Texas convention approved of the offer of annexation in July 1845, and Texas officially became the 28th U.S. state on December 29, 1845.

== U.S. Senator ==
=== Mexican–American War and aftermath (1846–1853) ===
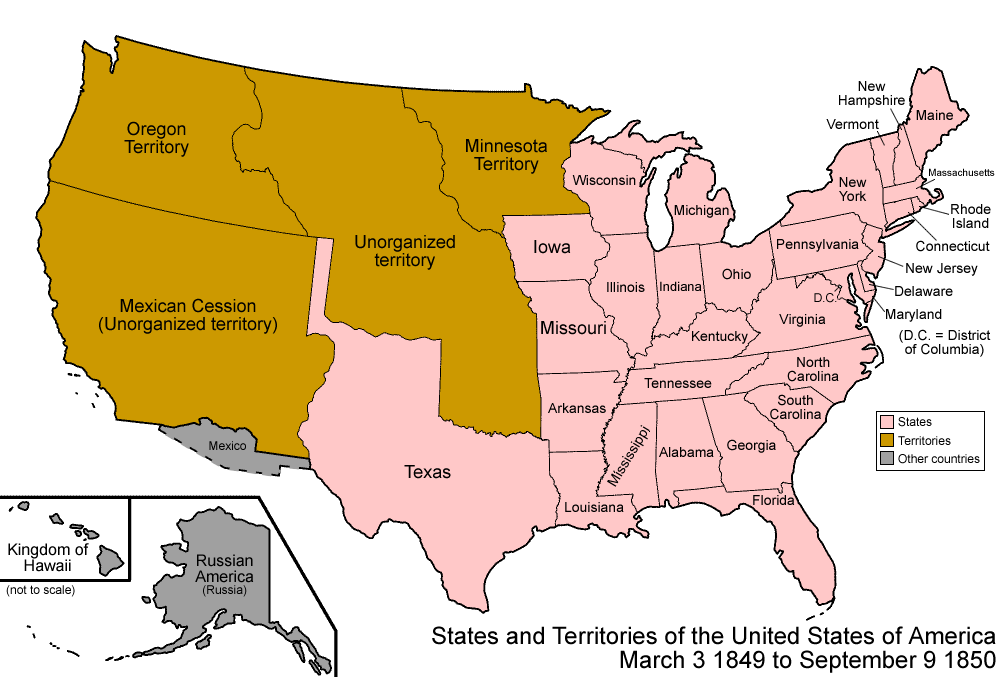
The United States in 1849, with the full extent of Texas's land claims shown

In February 1846, the Texas legislature elected Houston and Thomas Jefferson Rusk as Texas's two inaugural U.S. senators. Houston chose to align with the Democratic Party, which contained many of his old political allies, including President Polk. As a former president of Texas, Houston is the only former foreign head of state to have served in the U.S. Congress. He was the first person to serve as the governor of a state and then be elected to the U.S. Senate by another state. In 2018, Mitt Romney became the second. William W. Bibb accomplished the same feat in reverse order.

Breaking with the Senate tradition that held that freshman senators were not to address the Senate, Houston strongly advocated in early 1846 for the annexation of Oregon Country. In the Oregon Treaty, reached later in 1846, Britain and the United States agreed to split Oregon Country. Meanwhile, Polk ordered General Zachary Taylor to lead a U.S. army to the Rio Grande, which had been set as the Texas-Mexico border under the Treaty of Velasco; Mexico claimed the Nueces River constituted the true border. After a skirmish between Taylor's unit and the Mexican army, the Mexican–American War broke out in April 1846. Houston initially supported Polk's prosecution of the war, but differences between the two men emerged in 1847. After two years of fighting, the United States defeated Mexico and, through the Treaty of Guadalupe Hidalgo, acquired the Mexican Cession. Mexico also agreed to recognize the Rio Grande as the border between Mexico and Texas.

After the war, disputes over the extension of slavery into the territories raised sectional tensions. Unlike most of his Southern colleagues, Houston voted for the Oregon Bill of 1848, which organized Oregon Territory as a free territory. Defending his vote to create a territory that excluded slavery, Houston stated "I would be the last man to wish to do anything injurious to the South, but I do not think that on all occasions we are justified in agitating [slavery]." He criticized both Northern abolitionists and Democratic followers of Calhoun as extremists who sought to undermine the union. He supported the Compromise of 1850, a sectional compromise on slavery on the territories. Under the compromise, California was admitted as a free state, the slave trade was prohibited in the District of Columbia, a more stringent fugitive slave law was passed, and Utah Territory and New Mexico Territory were established. Texas gave up some of its claims on New Mexico, but it retained El Paso, Texas, and the United States assumed Texas's large public debt. Houston sought the Democratic nomination in the 1852 presidential election, but he was unable to consolidate support outside of his home state. The 1852 Democratic National Convention ultimately nominated Franklin Pierce, a compromise nominee, who went on to win the election.

=== Pierce and Buchanan administrations (1853–1859) ===
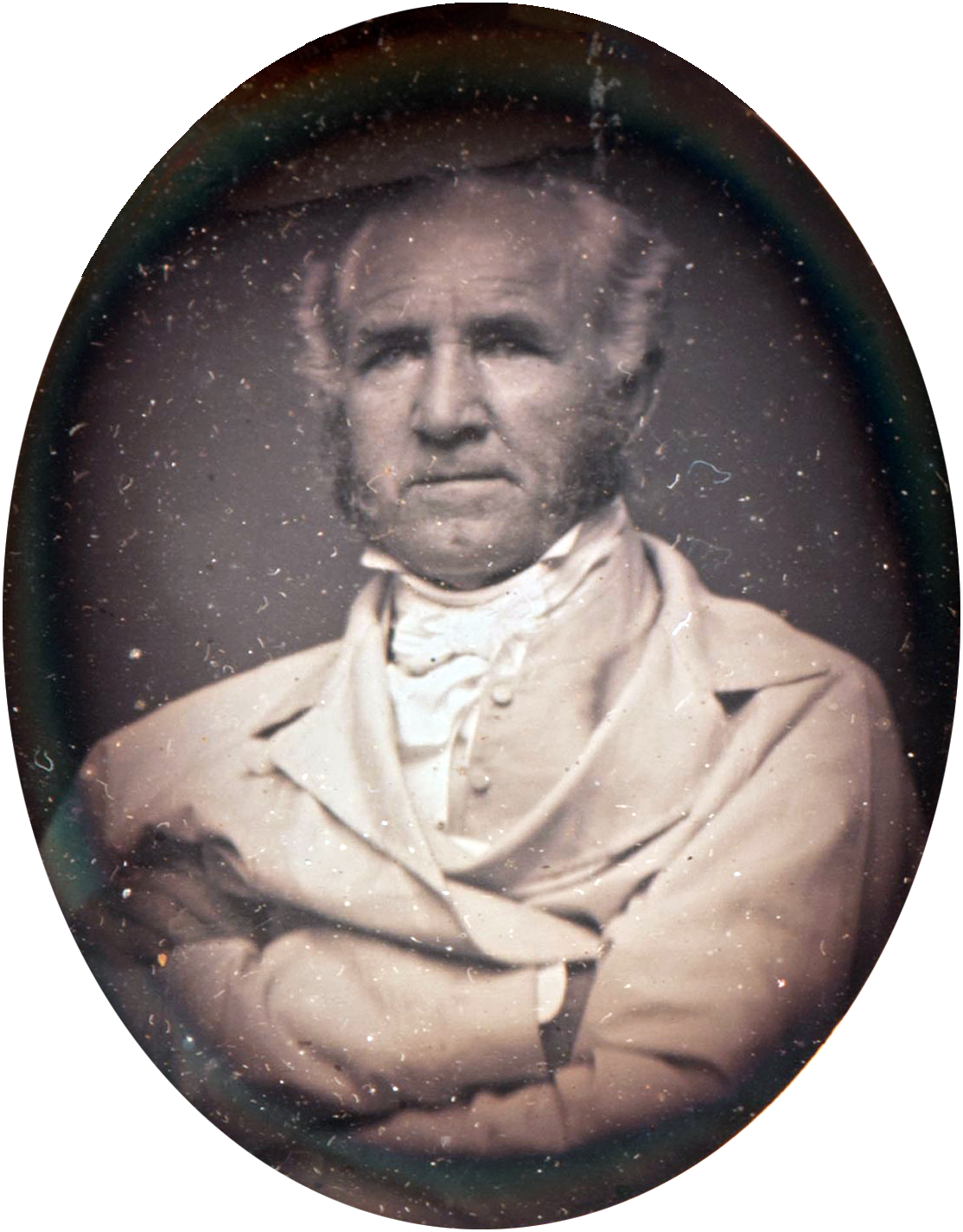
Houston c. 1856–1859

In 1854, Senator Stephen A. Douglas led the passage of the Kansas–Nebraska Act, which organized Kansas Territory and Nebraska Territory. The act also repealed the Missouri Compromise, an act that had banned slavery in territories north of parallel 36°30′ north. Houston voted against the act, in part because he believed that Native Americans would lose much of their land as a result of the act. He also perceived that it would lead to increased sectional tensions over slavery. Houston's opposition to the Kansas–Nebraska Act led to his departure from the Democratic Party. In 1855, Houston began to be associated publicly with the American Party, the political wing of the nativist and unionist Know Nothing movement. Houston warned that the repeal of the Missouri Compromise through the Kansas-Nebraska Act would deepen sectional divisions over slavery and threaten the survival of the United States. He believed disunion could result in "a sea of blood and smoking ruin," and his opposition to the act angered many Texans and distanced him from several former political allies because of his Unionist views. The Whig Party had collapsed after the passage of the Kansas–Nebraska Act, and the Know Nothings and the anti-slavery Republican Party had both emerged as major political movements. Houston's affiliation with the party stemmed in part from his fear of the growing influence of Catholic voters; though he opposed barring Catholics from holding office, he wanted to extend the naturalization period for immigrants to 21 years. He was attracted to the Know Nothing's support for a Native American state as well the party's unionist stance.

Houston sought the presidential nomination at the Know Nothing party's 1856 national convention, but the party nominated former President Millard Fillmore. Houston was disappointed by Fillmore's selection as well as the party platform, which did not rebuke the Kansas–Nebraska Act, but he eventually decided to support Fillmore's candidacy. Despite Houston's renewed support, the American Party split over slavery, and Democrat James Buchanan won the 1856 presidential election. The American Party collapsed after the election, and Houston did not affiliate with a national political party for the remainder of his tenure in the senate. In the 1857 Texas gubernatorial election, Texas Democrats nominated Hardin Richard Runnels, who supported the Kansas–Nebraska Act and attacked Houston's record. In response, Houston announced his own candidacy for governor, but Runnels defeated him by a decisive margin. It was the only electoral defeat of his career. After the gubernatorial election, the Texas legislature denied Houston re-election in the senate; Houston rejected calls to resign immediately and served until the end of his term in early 1859.

== Governor of Texas ==
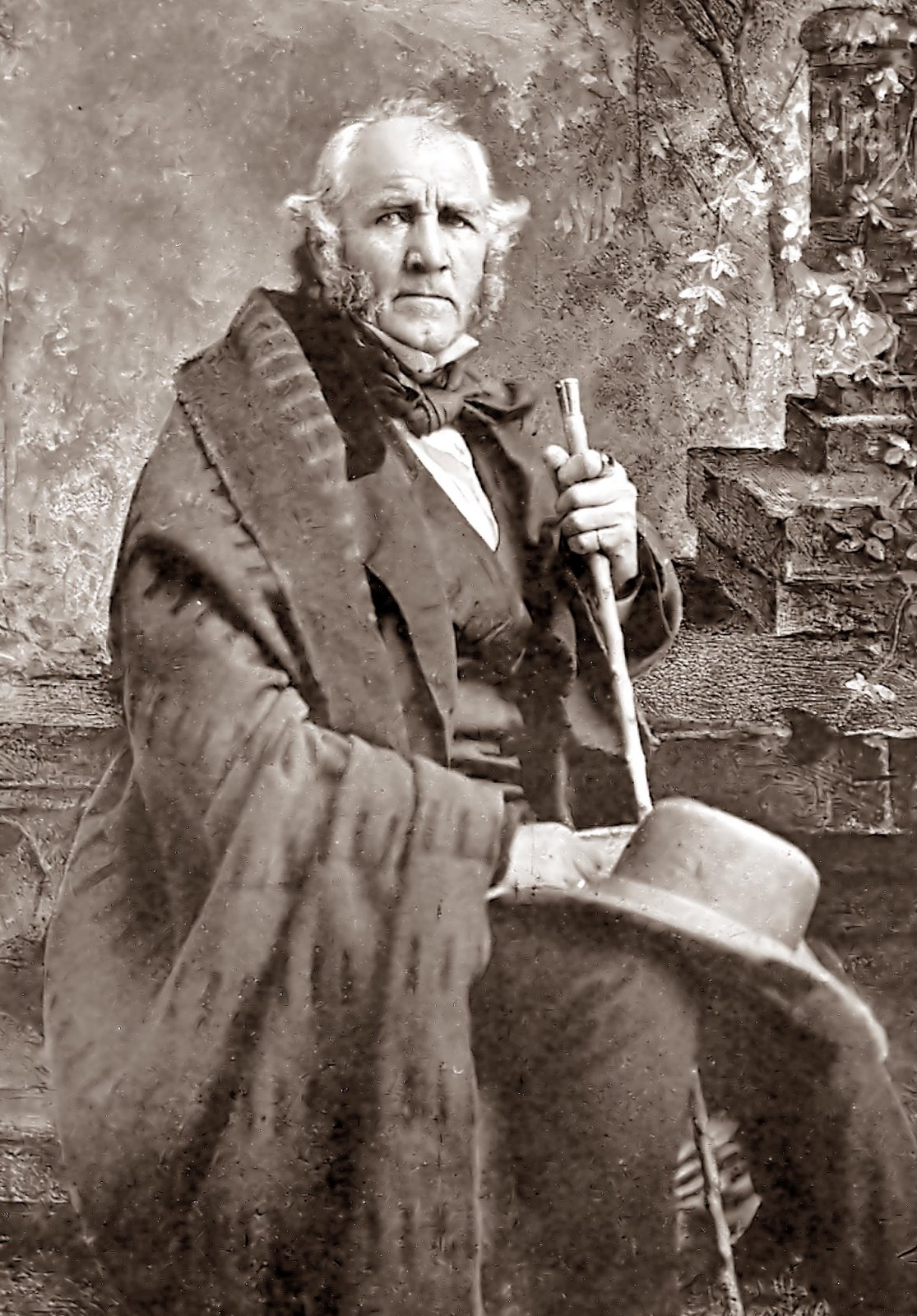
Sam Houston in 1861.

Before he successfully became the governor of Texas, Houston had run unsuccessfully in 1857. He ran again in 1859, and won. Houston ran against Runnels in the 1859 gubernatorial election. Capitalizing on Runnels's unpopularity over state issues such as Native American raids, Houston won the election and took office in December 1859. In the 1860 presidential election, Houston and John Bell were the two major contenders for the presidential nomination of the newly formed Constitutional Union Party, which consisted largely of Southern unionists. Houston narrowly trailed Bell on the first ballot of the 1860 Constitutional Union Convention, but Bell clinched the nomination on the second ballot. Nonetheless, some of Houston's Texan supporters nominated him for president in April 1860. Other backers attempted to launch a nationwide campaign, but in August 1860, Houston announced that he would not be a candidate for president. He refused to endorse any of the remaining presidential candidates. In late 1860, Houston campaigned across his home state, calling on Texans to resist those who advocated for secession if Republican nominee Abraham Lincoln won the 1860 election.

After Lincoln won the November 1860 presidential election, several Southern states seceded from the United States and formed the Confederate States of America. A Texas political convention voted to secede from the United States on February 1, 1861, and after Houston refused to swear an oath of loyalty to the Confederacy, the legislature declared the governorship vacant. Houston did not recognize the validity of his removal, but he did not attempt to use force to remain in office, and he refused aid from the federal government to prevent his removal. His successor, Edward Clark, was sworn in in March 1861. In an undelivered speech, Houston wrote:

Fellow-Citizens, in the name of your rights and liberties, which I believe have been trampled upon, I refuse to take this oath. In the name of the nationality of Texas, which has been betrayed by the Convention, I refuse to take this oath. In the name of the Constitution of Texas, I refuse to take this oath. In the name of my own conscience and manhood, which this Convention would degrade by dragging me before it, to pander to the malice of my enemies, I refuse to take this oath. I deny the power of this Convention to speak for Texas. ... I protest. ... against all the acts and doings of this convention and I declare them null and void.

On April 19, 1861, he told a crowd:

Let me tell you what is coming. After the sacrifice of countless millions of treasure and hundreds of thousands of lives, you may win Southern independence if God be not against you, but I doubt it. I tell you that, while I believe with you in the doctrine of states rights, the North is determined to preserve this Union. They are not a fiery, impulsive people as you are, for they live in colder climates. But when they begin to move in a given direction, they move with the steady momentum and perseverance of a mighty avalanche; and what I fear is, they will overwhelm the South.

According to historian Randolph Campbell:

Houston did everything possible to prevent secession and war, but his first loyalty was to Texas—and the South. Houston refused offers of troops from the United States to keep Texas in the Union and announced on May 10, 1861 that he would stand with the Confederacy in its war effort.

== Retirement and death ==
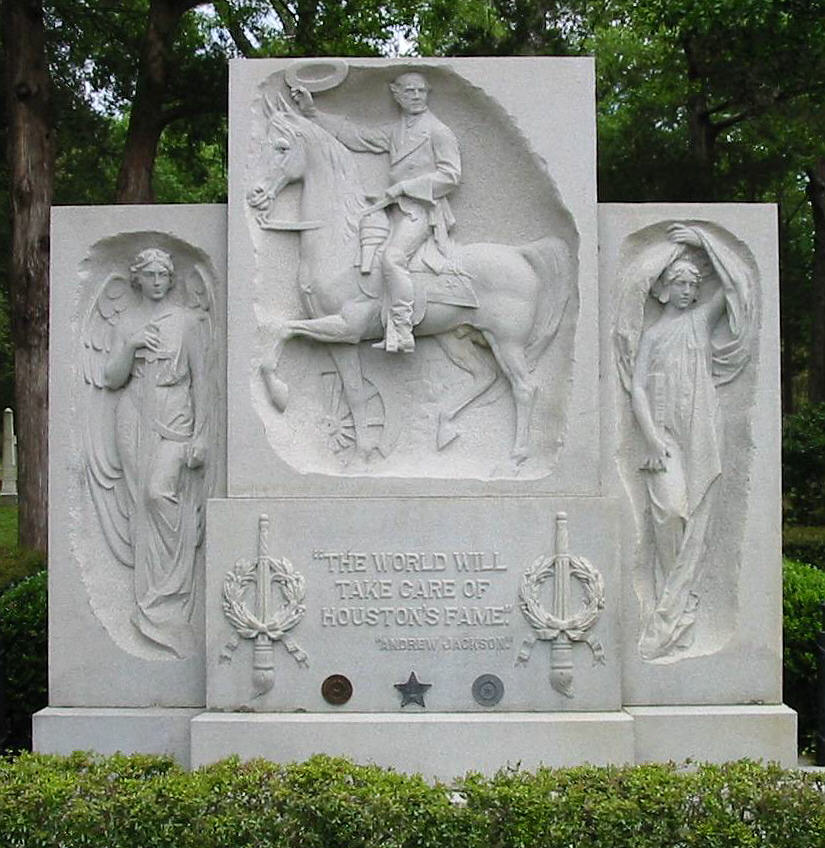
Houston's grave at Oakwood Cemetery in Huntsville, Texas

After leaving office, Houston returned to his home in Galveston. He later settled in Huntsville, Texas, where he lived in a structure known as the Steamboat House. In the midst of the Civil War, Houston was shunned by many Texas leaders, though he continued to correspond with Confederate officer Ashbel Smith and Texas governor Francis Lubbock. His son, Sam Houston Jr., served in the Confederate army during the Civil War, but returned home after being wounded at the Battle of Shiloh. Houston's health suffered a precipitous decline in April 1863, which contributed to his death on July 26, 1863, at 70 years of age. Houston's official cause of death is believed to be from pneumonia.

The inscription on Houston's tomb reads:

A Brave Soldier. A Fearless Statesman.
A Great Orator—A Pure Patriot.
A Faithful Friend, A Loyal Citizen.
A Devoted Husband and Father.
A Consistent Christian—An Honest Man.

== Personal life ==
In January 1829 Sam Houston, then Governor of Tennessee, married 19-year-old Eliza Allen. The marriage lasted 11 weeks. Neither Houston nor Eliza ever gave a reason for their separation, but Eliza refused to sanction divorce. Subsequently, he resigned his governorship and went to live with his Cherokee family for three years. In the summer of 1830, Houston married Dianna Rogers (sometimes called Tiana), daughter of Chief John "Hellfire" Rogers (1740–1833), a Scots-Irish trader, and Jennie Due (1764–1806), a sister of Chief John Jolly, in a Cherokee ceremony. The ceremony was modest since it was Dianna's second marriage; she was widowed with two children from her previous marriage: Gabriel, born 1819, and Joanna, born 1822. She and Houston first met when she was ten years old, and he was stunned to see how beautiful she was when he returned to her village years later. The two lived together for several years. Tennessee society disapproved of the marriage because under civil law, he was still legally married to Eliza Allen Houston. After declining to accompany Houston to Texas in 1832, Dianna later remarried. She died in 1838 of pneumonia. Will Rogers was her nephew, three generations removed.

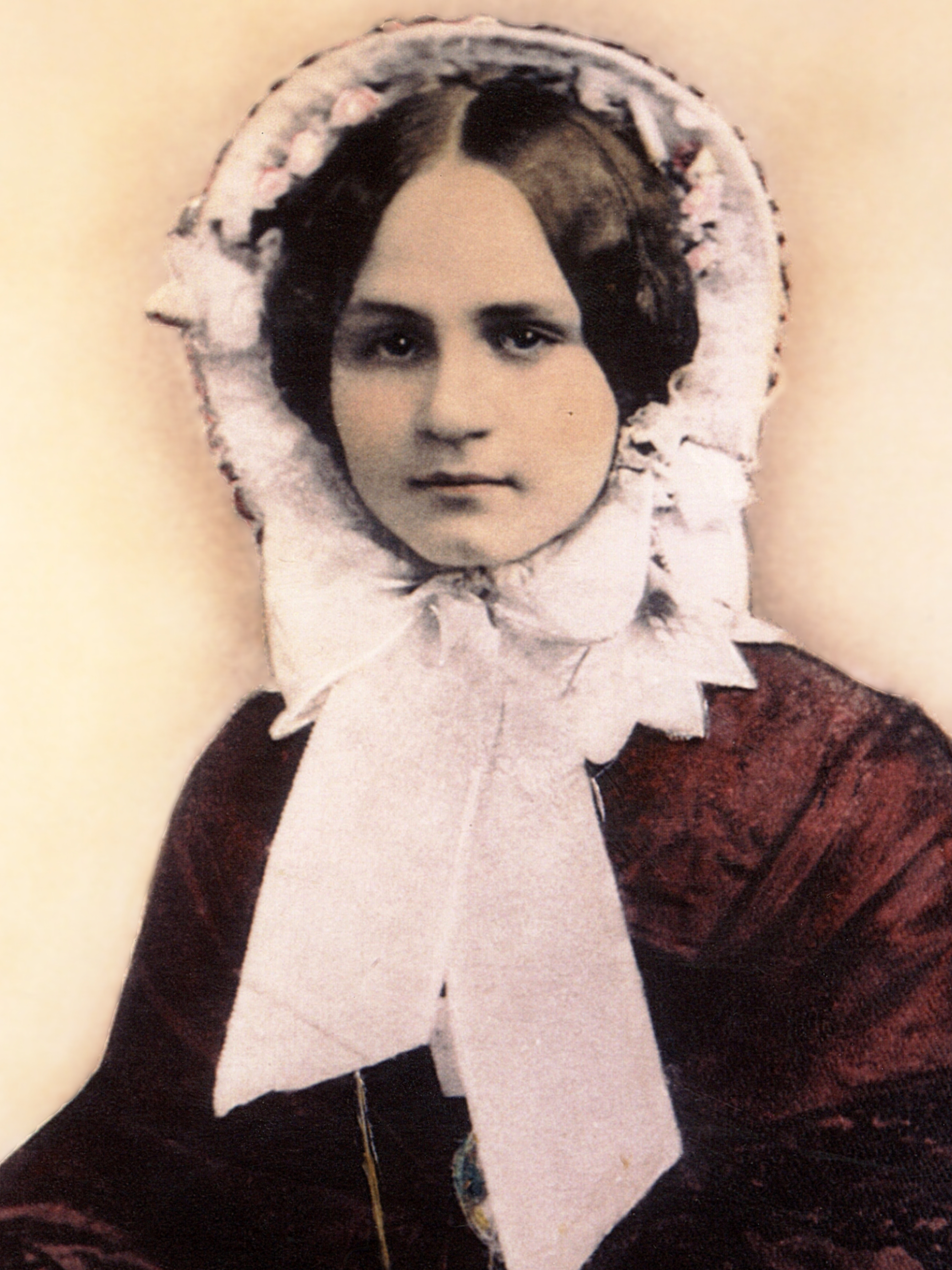
Margaret Lea Houston

In 1837, after becoming President of the Republic of Texas, he was able to acquire, from a district court judge, a divorce from Eliza Allen.

In 1839, he purchased a horse which became one of the foundation sires of the American Quarter Horse breed named Copperbottom. He owned the horse until its death in 1860.

On May 9, 1840, Houston, aged 47, married for a third time. His bride was 21-year-old Margaret Moffette Lea of Marion, Alabama, the daughter of planters. They had eight children, including Sam Jr., Andrew, and Temple. With Margaret being a woman of Baptist faith, she had influenced him to quit many of the bad habits he had developed, such as drinking and acting out. Although the Houstons had numerous houses, they kept only one continuously: Cedar Point (1840–1863) on Trinity Bay.

In 1833, Houston was baptized into the Catholic faith in order to qualify under the existing Mexican law for property ownership in Coahuila y Tejas. The sacrament was held in the living room of the Adolphus Sterne House in Nacogdoches, Texas. By 1854, Margaret had spent 14 years trying to convert Houston to the Baptist church. With the assistance of George Washington Baines, she convinced Houston to convert, and he agreed to adult baptism. Spectators from neighboring communities came to Independence, Texas, to witness the event. On November 19, 1854, Houston was baptized by Rev. Rufus C. Burleson, president of Baylor University, by immersion in Little Rocky Creek, two miles southeast of Independence.

=== Relationship to slavery and Mexicans ===
Houston was a slaveholder who had a complicated history with the institution of slavery. He was the president of the independent Republic of Texas, which was founded as a slave-holding nation, and governor of Texas after its 1845 annexation to the union as a slave state. He voted various times against the extension of slavery into the Western United States and he did not swear an oath to the Confederate States of America, which marked the end of his political career.

Houston believed that it was more important to stand by other states and their interests than to divide the United States over slavery. He stated that the country was founded on slavery, but when it did not suit the economic needs of Northern states, those states abolished slavery. He claimed that Northern states benefited from slave labor when they bought cotton and sugar produced from Southern plantations. Although he governed Texas as a slave-holding state and was a slave owner himself, he did not feel that it was in the best interests of Texas to secede from the Union over slavery.

Houston and his wife Margaret Lea relied on slaves to perform household, agricultural, carpentry, blacksmithing, and other duties for the family. Eliza, who came with Margaret into Houston's family, was critical to running the household and raising the children. She stayed with the daughters of Sam and Margaret until she died in 1898. The multi-skilled Joshua was important to meeting the needs of the family. Houston often hired his slaves out for money and allowed them to keep a portion of the money for themselves. When Houston died, Joshua offered to give money to Margaret to help support her children.

Until they were emancipated, Houston's slaves did not control where and how they were employed. There were limits to how they could spend their free time. They had little power to make decisions for themselves and their children.

There is a question about whether Houston made a pejorative comment about Mexicans in an 1835 speech to the Texas volunteer army at Refugio. One second hand source makes this claim; however, subsequent research casts doubt on the source and concludes that the disparaging comment is unlikely to have occurred.

== Legacy ==
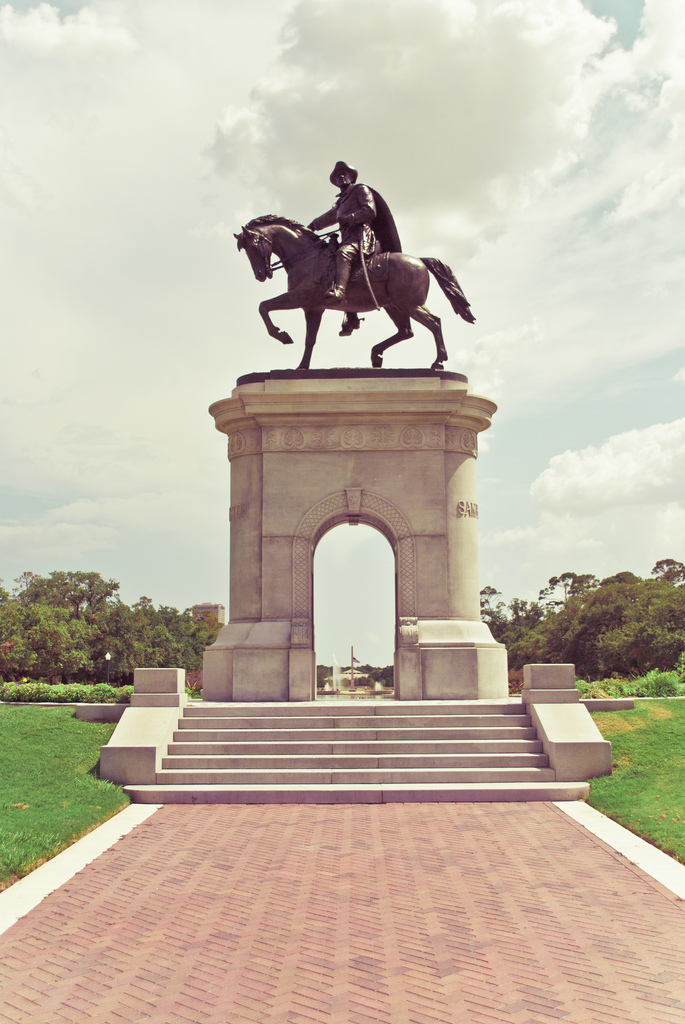
The Sam Houston monument by sculptor Enrico Cerracchio, in Houston, Texas's Hermann park

Houston, the largest city in Texas and the American South, is named in his honor. Several other things and places are named for Houston, including Sam Houston State University; Houston County, Minnesota; Houston County, Tennessee; Houston County, Texas. Other monuments and memorials include Sam Houston National Forest, Sam Houston Regional Library and Research Center, U.S. Army post Fort Sam Houston in San Antonio, the USS Sam Houston (SSBN-609), and a Texas State Highway Beltway 8 is named after Houston with the names Sam Houston Tollway and Sam Houston Parkway. A sculpture of Houston by Enrico Cerracchio is an outdoor bronze sculpture, installed at the northwest corner of Houston's Hermann Park, in Texas.

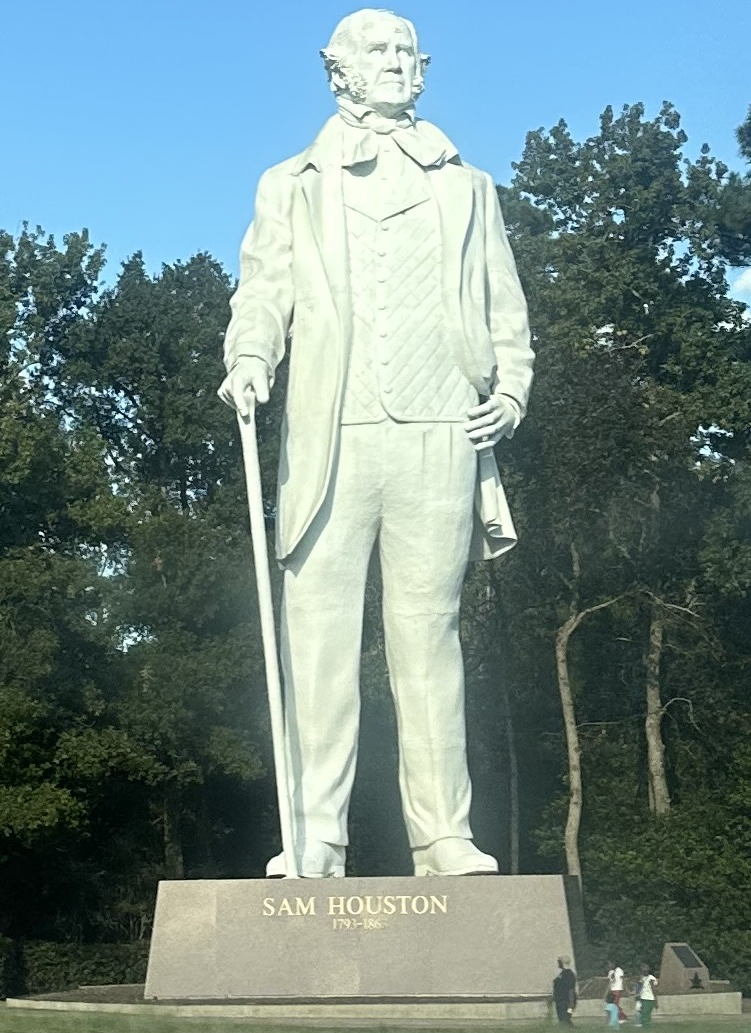
A Tribute to Courage statue in Huntsville, Texas

A 67-foot-tall statue of Houston, created by sculptor David Adickes in 1994, named A Tribute to Courage (and colloquially called "Big Sam") stands next to I-45, between Dallas and Houston, in Huntsville, Texas. It is the ninth-tallest statue in the United States and was vandalized with graffiti in March 2008. Along with Stephen F. Austin, Houston is one of two Texans with a statue in the National Statuary Hall. Houston has been portrayed in works such as Man of Conquest, Gone to Texas, Texas Rising, and The Alamo. In 1960, he was inducted into the Hall of Great Westerners of the National Cowboy & Western Heritage Museum.

== See also ==
- History of slavery in Texas
- Joshua Houston
- List of duels#United States
- Nathaniel Hale Pryor
- Sam Houston and American Indian relations

== Notes ==
U.S. House of Representatives
New constituency	Member of the U.S. House of Representatives from Tennessee's 7th congressional district 1823–1827	Succeeded by John Bell
Party political offices
First	Democratic nominee for Governor of Tennessee; 1827	Succeeded by William Carroll
Preceded by David Catchings Dickson	Know Nothing nominee for Governor of Texas; 1857	Last
First	Constitutional Union nominee for Governor of Texas; 1859	Last
Political offices
Preceded by William Carroll	Governor of Tennessee; 1827–1829	Succeeded by William Hall
Preceded by David G. Burnet; Acting	President of Texas; 1836–1838	Succeeded by Mirabeau B. Lamar
Preceded by Mirabeau B. Lamar	President of Texas; 1841–1844	Succeeded by Anson Jones
Preceded by Hardin R. Runnels	Governor of Texas; 1859–1861	Succeeded by Edward Clark
U.S. Senate
First	U.S. Senator (Class 2) from Texas; 1846–1859; Served alongside: Thomas Rusk, Pinckney Henderson, Matthias Ward	Succeeded by John Hemphill
