= Sam Houston Monument =

Statue by Enrico Cerracchio in Texas, US

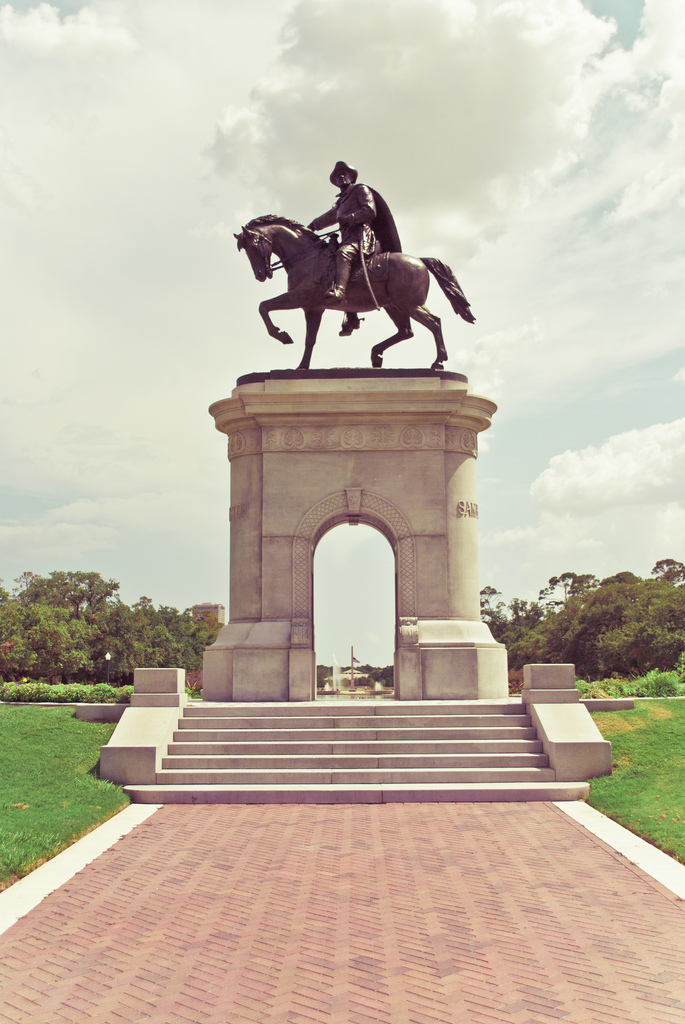
- The equestrian statue in 2011
- Artist: Enrico Cerracchio
- Year: 1925
- Type: Sculpture
- Medium: Bronze
- Subject: Sam Houston
- Dimensions: 6.1 m × 6.1 m × 2.7 m (20 ft × 20 ft × 9 ft)
- Condition: "Treatment urgent" (1993)
- Location: Houston, Texas, United States; 29°43′18″N 95°23′27″W
- Owner: City of Houston's Municipal Arts Commission

The Sam Houston Monument is an outdoor bronze sculpture of Sam Houston by Enrico Cerracchio, installed at the northwest corner of Houston's Hermann Park, in the U.S. state of Texas. The work is administered by the City of Houston's Municipal Arts Commission.

== Description ==
The monument was constructed by Enrico Cerracchio in 1924 and dedicated on August 16, 1925. Modeled on Stephen Seymour Thomas' painting, General Sam Houston at San Jacinto, the equestrian statue depicts Sam Houston atop his horse, wearing military attire and a long cape. He has a beard and points with his right arm. The bronze sculpture measures approximately 20 feet (6.1 m) x 20 feet (6.1 m) x 9 feet (2.7 m), and is set on a gray granite arch fabricated by Frank Teich that measures approximately 25 feet (7.6 m) x 18 feet (5.5 m) x 9 feet (2.7 m) with a Lone Star on its keystone. It is administered by the City of Houston's Municipal Arts Commission.

== Origins ==
A monument circle in the statue's current location was proposed by landscape architect George Kessler in his 1916 plan for Hermann Park.

As early as 1917, the Houston Chronicle was gathering money to build one for Sam Houston. Fabrication required $75,000, of which $40,000 was collected by the Women's City Club, $10,000 was provided by city government, and $25,000 was provided by state government. Potential designs were collected after advertising the project in national magazines. Entries were then displayed in a three night exhibition in the Humble Oil Building. The competition was judged by a panel of notable Houstonians, who selected Cerracchio's design.

On August 16, 1925, the monument was unveiled by Sam Houston's great-granddaughter and dedicated by John Henry Kirby. At the time, three of Sam Houston's own children were alive, and he was still remembered by many elderly Texans.

== Restoration ==
The monument's condition was deemed "treatment urgent" by the Smithsonian Institution's "Save Outdoor Sculpture!" program in March 1993.

In 1997, the monument was adopted by Bunker Hill Elementary's 5th grade. In 2006, the statue underwent an $18,000 restoration funded entirely by the students. As of 2009, 5th grade students at Bunker Hill Elementary and their corporate sponsors had raised money for the monument each year since 1993 and donated a total of more than $71,000 to the Houston Arts Foundation for its care.

== See also ==
- List of equestrian statues in the United States
- List of public art in Houston
