= First ladies and gentlemen of Texas =

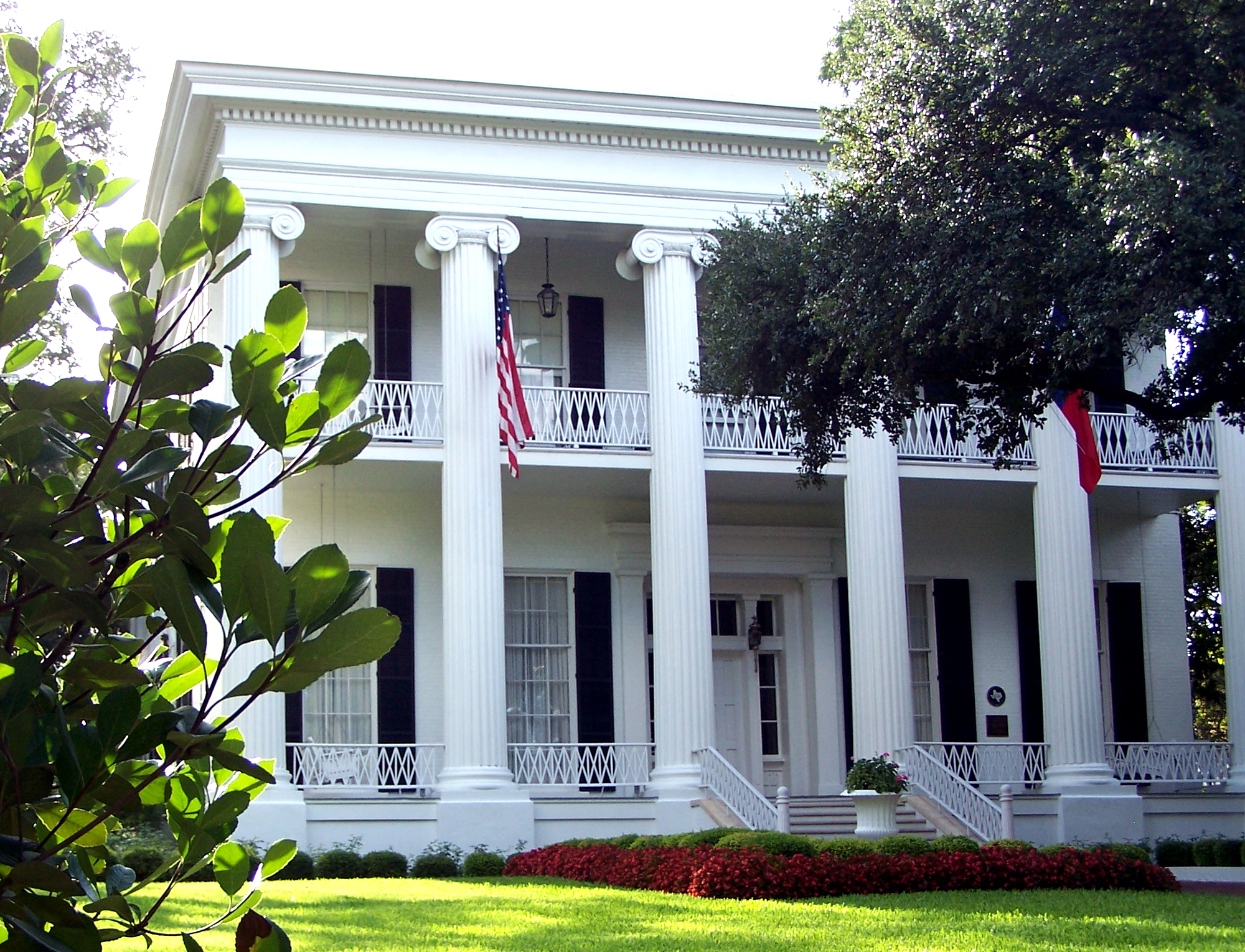
The Texas Governor's Mansion

The first lady or first gentleman of Texas is a title held by the spouse of the governor of Texas. Under both the Republic of Texas and the State of Texas, those that have served in the role have taken on numerous responsibilities.

Margaret Lea Houston, the wife of Sam Houston, is often considered the first first lady of Texas. Before her, Hannah Este Burnet served in the role as the wife of David G. Burnet, an interim Republic president before Sam Houston became the first president of the Republic of Texas. During Houston's first term, he was in the process of obtaining a divorce from his estranged wife in Tennessee. Houston's successor, Mirabeau B. Lamar, was a widower during his term in office.

Margaret Lea Houston campaigned with her husband when he ran for a second term as president and rode in the presidential parade, despite her dislike of politics. There was no government housing for the family of the president of the Republic. The Houstons divided their time among properties they owned. She saw herself not as a political wife, but as a homebody who was responsible for the health, welfare and religious education of her husband and her children. She became a virtual recluse when her husband was elected Governor of Texas and refused any visitors inside the mansion except her own relatives. Margaret Lea Houston's great-great granddaughter Jean Houston Baldwin Daniel also served as First Lady of Texas from 1957 to 1963.

Frances Cox Henderson, the wife of the state's first governor James Pinckney Henderson, was an outgoing supporter of women's suffrage and a multi-linguist who had been a book translator before she met Henderson.

The first first gentleman of Texas was James E. Ferguson, the husband of Miriam A. Ferguson. He had previously served as governor himself and was impeached on charges of misapplication of public funds and failing to enforce the banking laws of the state and resigned from office in 1917.

Mildred Paxton Moody had been a newspaper columnist and a professor at Hardin-Simmons University before she married Dan Moody. She used her influence as a former first lady to get the Texas State Legislature to create the Board of Mansion Supervisors to oversee the finances of maintaining the official residence. Rita Crocker Clements not only restored the Governor's Mansion, but had been involved in politics decades before she married Bill Clements. Former first lady Anita Thigpen Perry had a background in nursing and two nursing educational endowments bear her name.

== Republic of Texas ==
First ladies of the Republic of Texas
Name	Image	Birth–Death	Term	President	Ref(s)
Hannah Burnet		(1800–1858)	March 16 – October 22, 1836	David G. Burnet	
—	—	—	October 22, 1836 – December 10, 1838	Sam Houston	
—	—	—	December 10, 1838 – December 13, 1841	Mirabeau B. Lamar	(Note: Lamar was widowed in 1830 and did not remarry until 1851.)
Margaret Lea Houston	Margaret Lea Houston	(1819–1867)	December 13, 1841 – December 9, 1844	Sam Houston	
Mary Smith Jones	Mary Smith Jones	(1819–1907)	December 9, 1844 – February 19, 1846	Anson Jones	

== State of Texas ==
First ladies and gentlemen of the State of Texas
Name	Image	Birth–Death	Term	Governor	Ref(s)
Frances Cox Henderson		(1820–1897)	February 19, 1846 – December 21, 1847	James Pinckney Henderson	
Martha Evans Gindratt Wood		(d. 1861)	December 21, 1847 – December 21, 1849	George T. Wood	
—	—	—	December 21, 1849 – November 23, 1853	Peter Hansborough Bell	
Laura A. Hooker Henderson		(d. 1856)	November 23, 1853 – December 21, 1853	James W. Henderson	
Lucadia Christiana Niles Pease		(1813–1905)	December 21, 1853 – December 21, 1857	Elisha M. Pease	(Note: Elisha and Lucadia Pease were the first occupants of the official Governor's Mansion.)
—	—	—	December 21, 1857 – December 21, 1859	Hardin Richard Runnels	
Margaret Lea Houston		(1819–1867)	December 21, 1859 – March 18, 1861	Sam Houston	
Martha Melissa Evans Clark			March 18, 1861 – November 7, 1861	Edward Clark	
Adele Baron Lubbock		(1819–1882)	November 7, 1861 – November 5, 1863	Francis R. Lubbock	
Sue Ellen Taylor Murrah		(b. 1835)	November 5, 1863 – June 17, 1865	Pendleton Murrah	
—	—	—	June 11, 1865 – June 16, 1865	Fletcher Summerfield Stockdale	
Mary Jane Bowen Hamilton		(1828–1916)	June 17, 1865 – August 9, 1866	Andrew J. Hamilton	
Ann Rattan Throckmorton		(1828–1895)	August 9, 1866 – August 8, 1867	James W. Throckmorton	
Lucadia Christiana Niles Pease		(1813–1905)	June 8, 1867 – September 30, 1869	Elisha M. Pease	
Anne Elizabeth Britton Davis		(b. 1838)	January 8, 1870 – January 15, 1874	Edmund J. Davis	
Mary Evans Horne Coke		(1837–1900)	January 15, 1874 – December 21, 1876	Richard Coke	
Janie Roberts Hubbard		(1848–1887)	December 21, 1876 – January 21, 1879	Richard B. Hubbard	
Frances Wickliffe Edwards Roberts		(1819–1883)	January 21, 1879 – January 16, 1883	Oran Milo Roberts	
Anna Maria Penn Ireland		(1833–1911)	January 16, 1883 – January 20, 1887	John Ireland	
Elizabeth Dorothy Tinsley Ross		(1846–1905)	January 18, 1887 – January 20, 1891	Lawrence Sullivan Ross	
Sarah Ann Stinson Hogg		(1854–1895)	January 20, 1891 – January 15, 1895	James Stephen Hogg	
Sallie Harrison Culberson		(1861–1926)	January 15, 1895 – January 17, 1899	Charles A. Culberson	
Orline Walton Sayers		(1851–1943)	January 17, 1899 – January 20, 1903	Joseph D. Sayers	
Sarah Beona Meng Lanham		(1845–1908)	January 20, 1903 – January 15, 1907	S. W. T. Lanham	
Fannie Bruner Campbell		(1856–1934)	January 15, 1907 – January 17, 1911	Thomas Mitchell Campbell	
Alice Murrell Colquitt		(1865–1949)	January 17, 1911 – January 19, 1915	Oscar Branch Colquitt	
Miriam A. Ferguson		(1875–1961)	January 19, 1915 – August 25, 1917	James E. Ferguson	
Willie Cooper Hobby		(1876–1929)	August 25, 1917 – January 18, 1921	William P. Hobby	
Myrtle Mainer Neff			January 18, 1921 – January 20, 1925	Pat Morris Neff	
James E. Ferguson		(1871–1944)	January 20, 1925 – January 17, 1927	Miriam A. Ferguson	
Mildred Paxton Moody		(1897–1983)	January 17, 1927 – January 20, 1931	Dan Moody	
Maud Gage Sterling		(1874–1963)	January 20, 1931 – January 17, 1933	Ross S. Sterling	
James E. Ferguson		(1871–1944)	January 17, 1933 – January 15, 1935	Miriam A. Ferguson	
Joe Betsy Miller Allred		(1905–1993)	January 15, 1935 – January 17, 1939	James V. Allred	
Merle Estella Butcher O'Daniel		Unknown	January 17, 1939 – August 4, 1941	W. Lee O'Daniel	
Fay Wright Stevenson		(1896–1942)	August 4, 1941 – January 2, 1942	Coke Stevenson	(Note: Fay died January 1942)
Mable Buchanan Jester		Unknown	January 21, 1947 – July 11, 1949	Beauford H. Jester	
Marialice Shary Shivers		(1910–1996)	July 11, 1949 – January 15, 1957	Allan Shivers	
Jean Daniel		(1916–2002)	January 15, 1957 – January 15, 1963	Price Daniel	
Nellie Connally		(1919–2006)	January 15, 1963 – January 21, 1969	John Connally	
Ima Mae Smith		(1911–1998)	January 21, 1969 – January 16, 1973	Preston Smith	
Betty Jane Slaughter Briscoe		(1923–2000)	January 16, 1973 – January 16, 1979	Dolph Briscoe	
Rita Crocker Clements		(1931–2018)	January 16, 1979 – January 18, 1983	Bill Clements	
Linda Gale White		(b. 1942)	January 18, 1983 – January 20, 1987	Mark White	
Rita Crocker Clements		(1931–2018)	January 20, 1987 – January 15, 1991	Bill Clements	
—	—	—	January 15, 1991 – January 17, 1995	Ann Richards	(Note: Richards was divorced in 1984.)
Laura Bush		(b. 1946)	January 17, 1995 – December 21, 2000	George W. Bush	
Anita Thigpen Perry		(b. 1952)	December 21, 2000 – January 20, 2015	Rick Perry	
Cecilia Phalen Abbott		(b. 1959)	January 20, 2015	Greg Abbott	
John Philip Donisi		(b. 1965)	January 20, 2027	Gina Hinojosa	

== Notes ==
=== References ===
- Alvarez, Elizabeth Cruce; Plocheck, Robert (2011). Texas Almanac 2012–2013. Texas A & M University Press. ISBN 978-0-87611-247-2.
- Biles, Stephen P. (2014). Encyclopedia of Early Texas History: A Compendium of Texas Antiquity for the Inquisitive Mind. Charleston, SC: The History Press. ISBN 978-1-62619-454-0.
