= Frances Cox Henderson =

First Lady of Texas (1820–1897)

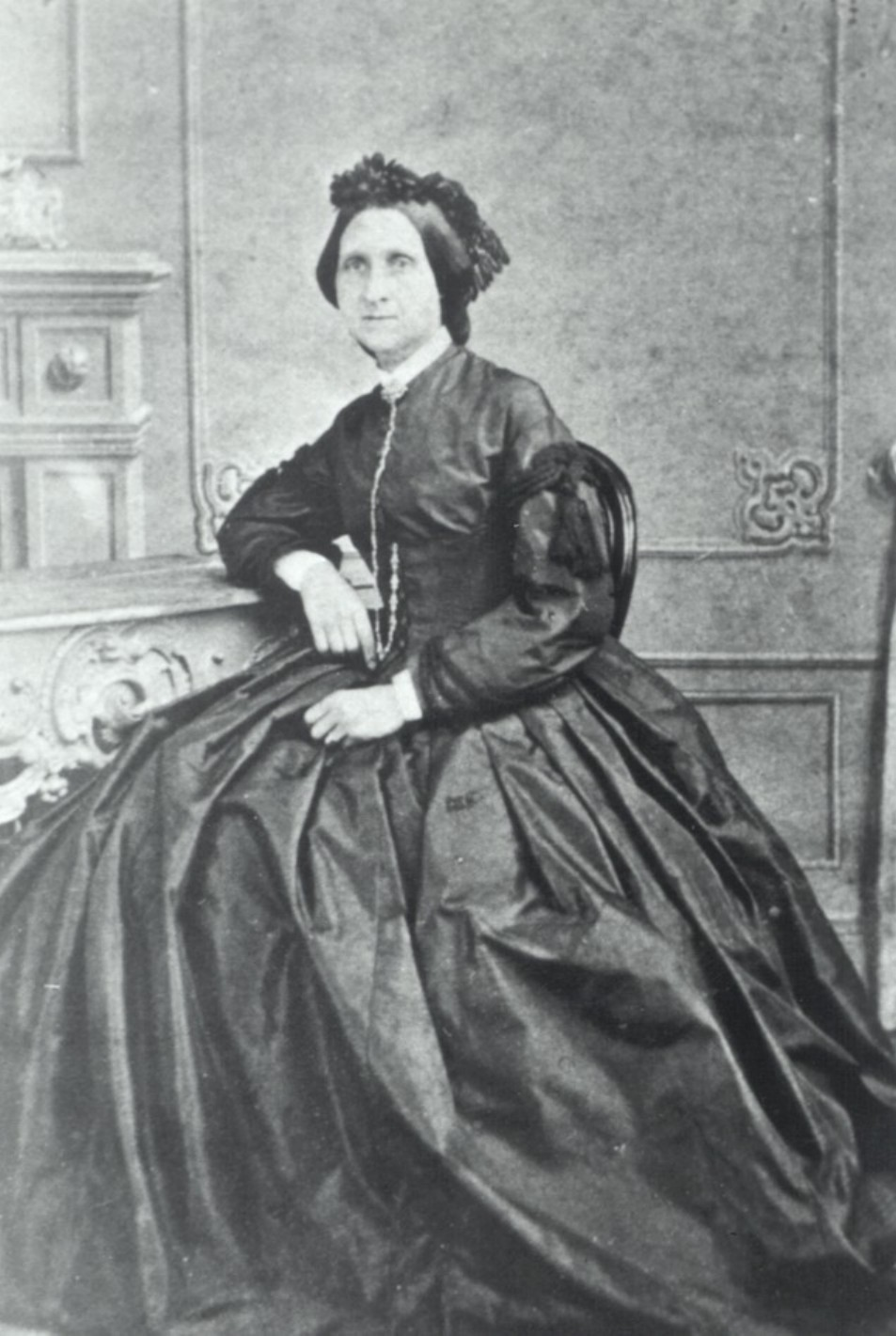

First Lady of Texas
- In role February 19, 1846 – December 21, 1847
- Governor: James Pinckney Henderson
- Preceded by: Position established
- Succeeded by: Martha Evans Gindratt Wood

Personal details
- Born: Frances Cox; July 21, 1820 Philadelphia, Pennsylvania, U.S.
- Died: January 25, 1897 (aged 76) East Orange, New Jersey, U.S.
- Resting place: Rosedale Cemetery, Orange, New Jersey, U.S.
- Party: Democratic
- Spouse: James Pinckney Henderson (m. 1839; died 1858)
- Children: 5

Frances Cox Henderson (July 21, 1820 – January 25, 1897) was the First Lady of Texas and the wife of the first Governor of the State of Texas, James Pinckney Henderson. She was well-educated and multi-lingual, translating books in Europe. Throughout her life, she was involved in civic work such as women's suffrage, and helped run her husband's law office. She was instrumental in helping the Episcopal Church establish individual congregations in East Texas. In her final years living in New Jersey, she established the Good Shepherd home for women.

== Early life and education ==
She was born to John Cox and his wife Martha Lyman Cox on July 21, 1820, in Philadelphia, Pennsylvania. In 1829, John Cox sent Frances and her siblings to Europe for their educations. Frances became fluent in eighteen of the twenty-five languages she eventually learned to speak., becoming a literary translator at age fourteen. She became adept at mathematics and showed talent as a musician. Later in life, she would exhibit organizational abilities that enabled her in civic endeavors. She was also a supporter of women's suffrage.

== Move to Texas ==
The future First Lady of Texas met James Pinckney Henderson when he represented the Republic of Texas as a minister to France at the Tuileries Palace, and to England at the Court of St. James's. On October 30, 1839, the couple were wed at St George's, Hanover Square. They established a residence and law office in San Augustine. Frances became educated in the practice of the law in order to help run her husband's office.

== Faith ==
Frances Henderson was a member of the Episcopal Church and helped establish churches in the East Texas towns of Trinity, San Augustine, Rusk, Palestine and Nacogdoches. In her final years, she was a devoted member of St. Mark's Episcopal Church in New Jersey.

== Later years and death ==
The Hendersons had five children, of which daughters Martha, Fanny and Julia lived to adulthood.

Governor Henderson died in Washington, D.C., in 1858 while he was serving as Senator for the Republic of Texas. He is buried at the Texas State Cemetery. During the Civil War, Frances sold the Henderson's land holdings in Texas and moved to Europe with her daughters. With the war's end, Frances moved to East Orange, New Jersey, with her daughter Julia and son-in-law Edward White Adams. Frances was involved in civic work and established the Good Shepherd home for women. she died in 1897

== Bibliography ==
- Henderson, Frances Cox (1874). Priscilla Baker: Freed Woman.
- Henderson, Frances Cox (1881). Dunderviksborg, and Other Tales. Lippincott.
- Henderson, Frances Cox (1882). An Epitome of Modern European Literature. Lippincott.

Honorary titles
Preceded by N/A	First Lady of Texas; 1846–1847	Succeeded by Martha Gindrat Wood
