= Nellie Connally =

First Lady of Texas from 1963 to 1969

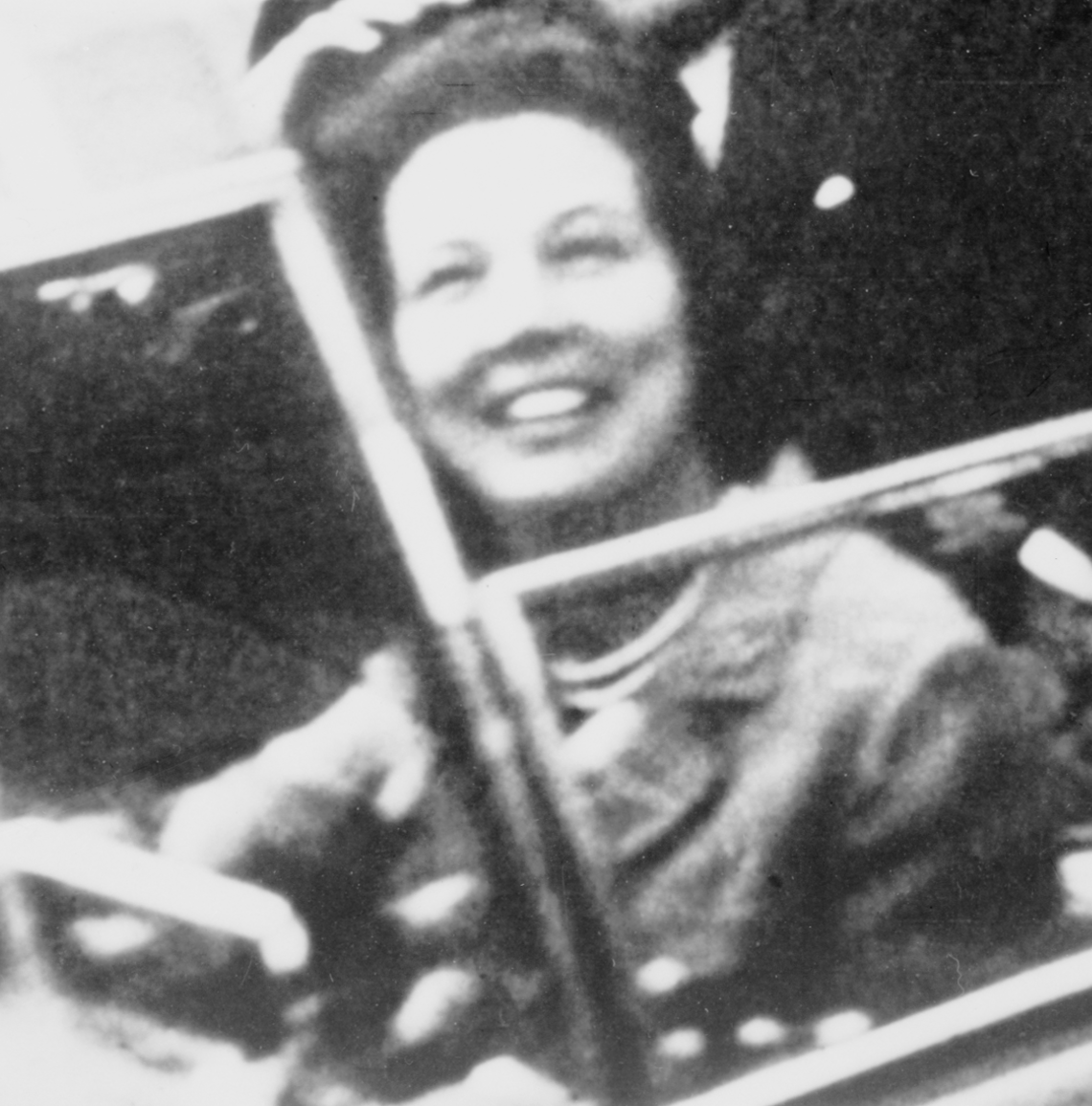
- Connally in the presidential limousine on November 22, 1963

First Lady of Texas
- In role January 15, 1963 – January 21, 1969
- Governor: John Connally
- Preceded by: Jean Daniel
- Succeeded by: Ima Smith

Personal details
- Born: Idanell Brill; February 24, 1919 Austin, Texas, U.S.
- Died: September 1, 2006 (aged 87) Austin, Texas, U.S.
- Resting place: Texas State Cemetery
- Spouse: John Connally (m. 1940; died 1993)
- Children: 4
- Education: University of Texas

Idanell Brill Connally (née Brill; February 24, 1919 – September 1, 2006) was the First Lady of Texas from 1963 to 1969. She was the wife of John Connally, who served as Governor of Texas and later as Secretary of the Treasury. She and her husband were passengers in the Presidential limousine carrying United States President John F. Kennedy when he was assassinated in Dallas, Texas on November 22, 1963.

== Early life ==
Connally was born Idanell Brill in Austin, Texas, the eldest of five children of Kathleen Annie (née Inks) and Arno W. Brill. She attended the University of Texas where she was named "Sweetheart of the University" in 1938 and was initiated as a member of Delta Delta Delta. Connally initially had aspirations to become an actress but gave up those plans after meeting her future husband, John Connally, while attending UT in 1937. The two married in 1940.

== First Lady of Texas ==
John Connally began his career in politics working for then-Congressman (and future United States President) Lyndon B. Johnson. John Connally was elected Governor of Texas in 1962. He was subsequently re-elected for two additional terms. During her tenure as First Lady, Connally created the gardens at the Texas Governor's Mansion and also collected the state silver.

=== Kennedy assassination ===
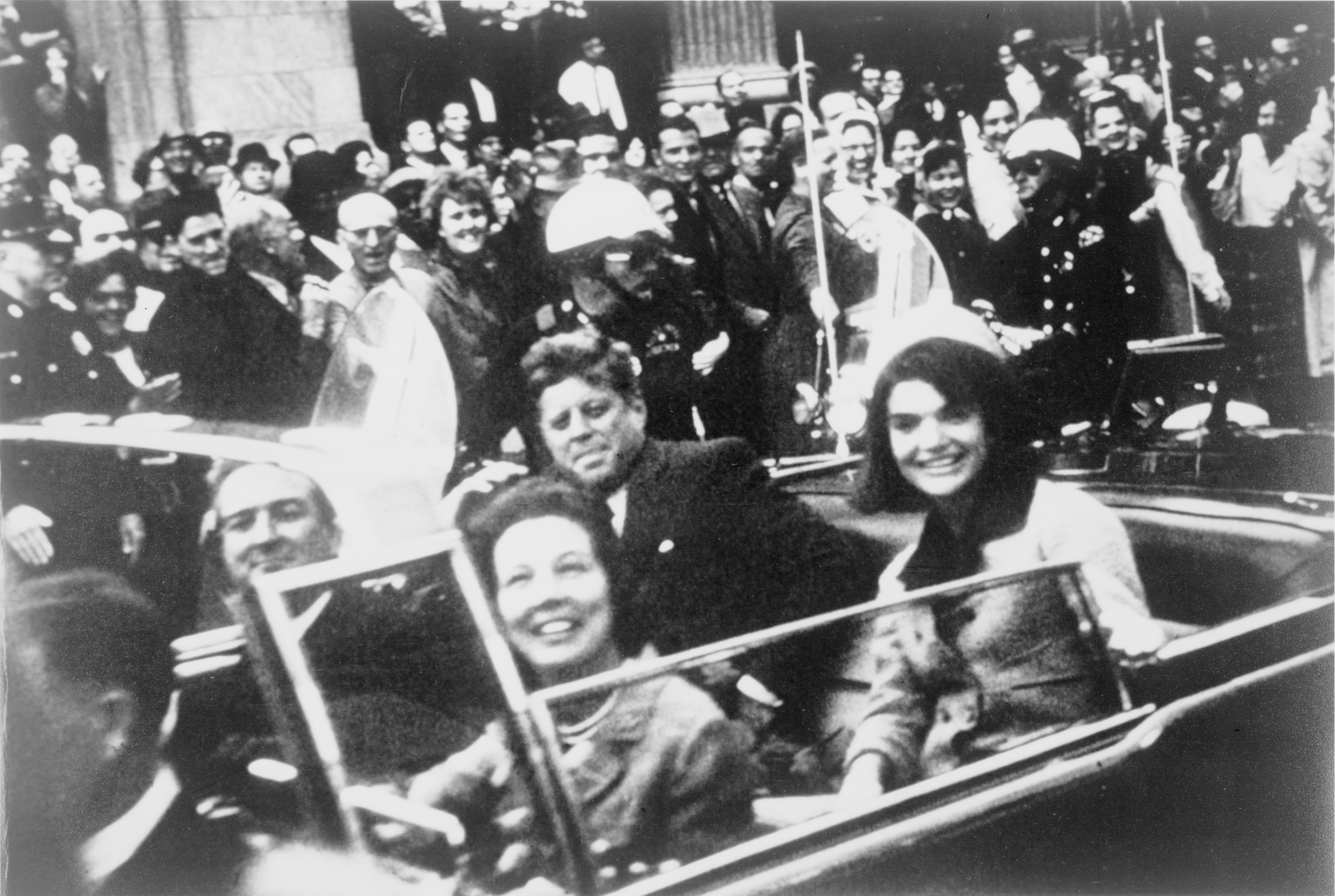
United States President John F. Kennedy, First Lady Jacqueline Kennedy and the Connallys in the presidential limousine before the assassination

On November 22, 1963, Connally and her husband were riding in the presidential limousine that carried United States President John F. Kennedy when he was assassinated in Dallas, Texas. While riding in the car with President Kennedy, Connally told President Kennedy, "Mr. President, you can't say Dallas doesn't love you," which President Kennedy acknowledged by saying "No, you certainly can't." Within a few seconds, she heard the first of what she later concluded were three gunshots in quick succession.

The President and Governor Connally were shot, resulting in fatal wounds to the President and serious ones to the Governor. Nellie Connally got down in the car to take care of her husband, who had slumped after the second shot. "I never looked back again. I was just trying to take care of him," she said. Connally had said the most enduring image she had of the assassination in Dallas was of a mixture of blood and roses. "It's the image of yellow roses and red roses and blood all over the car ... all over us", she said in a 2003 interview with The Associated Press. "I'll never forget it. ... It was so quick and so short, so potent."

In her 2003 book From Love Field—Our Final Hours with John F. Kennedy, Connally shared her personal diary of the event written in the days immediately after the assassination. In her book, she said that she believed that her husband was hit by a bullet that was separate from the two that had hit Kennedy.

== Later years ==
=== Advocacy and charity work ===
After serving as Texas's First Lady, Connally worked to raise money for several charities including the Children's Miracle Network Telethon for Hermann Children's Hospital. She served on the University of Texas MD Anderson Cancer Center Board of Visitors from 1984, and a fund in her name raised millions for research and patient programs. She was later named Woman of Distinction by the Crohn's and Colitis Foundation. Connally was also a member of the Texas Historical Commission and helped to complete Tranquility Park located in Houston.

In 1988, Connally was diagnosed with breast cancer. She was treated and went into remission. The following year, Richard Nixon, Donald Trump, and Barbara Walters turned out for a gala to honor her and raise money for diabetes research. In 1998, ten years after her breast cancer diagnosis, Connally celebrated her birthday with fellow breast cancer survivors at a ceremony in the Nellie B. Connally Breast Center at Anderson Hospital in Houston.

=== Bankruptcy ===
Private business ventures after 1980 were less successful than John Connally's career as a politician and dealmaking Houston lawyer. An oil company in which he invested encountered trouble, and $200 million of real-estate projects failed. He filed for reorganization of his personal finances under Chapter 11 of the federal bankruptcy code and for liquidation, under Chapter 7, of the Barnes–Connally Partnership, the Austin-based real-estate venture that he founded with former Lt. Gov. Ben Barnes. The auction paid only a fraction of the $93 million in debts that Connally listed with the bankruptcy court in Austin.

== Personal life ==
John Connally and Nellie were married at the First United Methodist Church in Austin on December 21, 1940. They had four children: Kathleen, John B. Connally III, Sharon, and Mark Madison. In 1959, Robert Allen Hale was cleared by a coroner's jury in Florida of responsibility related to the April 1959 shooting death of Connally's teenaged daughter (Kathleen Connally Hale). Robert Hale and Kathleen Connally Hale had been married 44 days at the time of her death. The Connallys remained married until John's death from pneumonia in 1993.

=== Death ===
On September 1, 2006, Connally died in her sleep at the age of 87. At the time of her death, she was living at Westminster Manor, an assisted living facility in Austin where she had lived for approximately one year. She is buried in the Texas State Cemetery in Austin.

Honorary titles
Preceded by Jean Houston Baldwin Daniel	First Lady of Texas; 1963–1969	Succeeded by Ima Mae Smith
