= Rita Crocker Clements =

First Lady of Texas

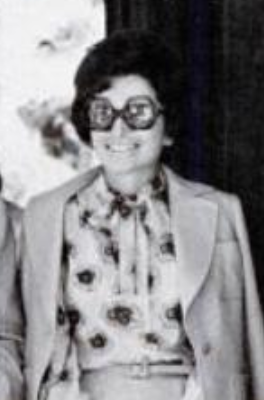
- Clements in 1975

First Lady of Texas
- In role January 20, 1987 – January 15, 1991
- Governor: Bill Clements
- Preceded by: Linda Gale White
- Succeeded by: Laura Bush (1995)
- In role January 16, 1979 – January 18, 1983
- Governor: Bill Clements
- Preceded by: Janey Slaughter Briscoe
- Succeeded by: Linda Gale White

Personal details
- Born: Rita Crocker; October 30, 1931 Newton, Kansas, U.S.
- Died: January 6, 2018 (aged 86) Dallas, Texas, U.S.
- Cause of death: Alzheimer's disease
- Resting place: Grove Hill Memorial Park; Dallas, Texas, U.S.
- Party: Republican
- Spouse(s): Richard Bass (m. 1952; div. 1974) Bill Clements (m. 1975; died 2011)
- Children: 4
- Education: University of Texas

Rita Crocker Clements (October 30, 1931 – January 6, 2018) was an American Republican Party organizer, an activist in historic preservation, and a First Lady of the U.S. state of Texas.

== Early life ==
She was born in Newton, Kansas, on October 30, 1931, to rancher and political activist Mason Crocker and his wife Florabel. The family relocated to Brady, Texas, when she was 10 years old. She attended The Hockaday School in Texas, graduating in 1949. She then studied at Wellesley College, Massachusetts, before completing her undergraduate degree in 1953 at the University of Texas at Austin. She graduated with honors in Spanish and also minored in history and government. Her 1952 marriage to Richard Bass produced four children. They divorced in 1974, and in 1975 she married Bill Clements.

Beginning her political career as a volunteer for Dwight D. Eisenhower's 1952 campaign for President of the United States, by 1958, she had risen to Republican Party precinct chairman in Dallas County. Her continued involvement in party politics helped elect John Tower to the United States Senate in 1961. She served as state co-chair of the 1964 committee for the Barry Goldwater presidential campaign. Clements was appointed to the Republican National Committee in 1973. From 1972 to 1975 she was a member of the National Advisory Council for Economic Opportunity.

Serving as First Lady of Texas during the two non-consecutive terms (1979–1983 and 1987–1991) of her husband Governor Bill Clements, she was a key strategist in each of her husband's election campaigns.

Her leadership of the Texas Main Street program, part of the Texas Historic Commission, put her in the forefront of preserving the state's history. The program aimed to maintain local town centers through the preservation of landmarks and the revival of sustaining businesses. During 1979–1982, she also spearheaded the renovation of the Texas Governor's Mansion. She and the Governor founded the non-profit organization Friends of the Governor's Mansion to raise private money for the project, as well as to fund future maintenance of the mansion. The non-profit organization initially raised $3 million. The state legislature appropriated an additional $1 million for the restoration. During her husband's second term in office, Clements contributed to the campaign to have the 1888 Texas Capitol restored.

== Later life ==
In her post-First Lady of Texas life, she continued to be active in business and civic organizations on heritage preservation, education, volunteerism and advocacy of women's issues. She served on the boards of La Quinta Motor Inns, Team Bank, Bank One, Texas, Dr Pepper, the Dallas Historical Society and the educational foundation The O'Donnell Foundation of Dallas, which she had co-founded in 1957. In 1996, she was appointed to the University of Texas Board of Regents by Governor George W. Bush, and re-appointed by Governor Rick Perry, serving until November 2007.

== Death ==
Clements died in Dallas on January 6, 2018, from complications of Alzheimer's disease at the age of 86. On news of her death, President George W. Bush and First Lady Laura Bush released a statement of condolence, acknowledging Clements' strength and service to the state of Texas.

== Honors and awards ==
Clements received the Miss Ima Hogg Special Award from the Winedale Society and the Ruth B. Lester Award from the Texas Historical Commission for her work on heritage preservation. In 1991, she was named a Distinguished Alumna of the University of Texas. In 1996, Clements was elected to the Texas Women's Hall of Fame.

In 2007, the Texas State History Museum Foundation bestowed former Governor and Rita Clements with the History-Making Texan Award. In 2009 the couple were recipients of the Santa Rita Award for their contributions to the University of Texas System.

Honorary titles
| Preceded by Linda Gail White | First Lady of Texas; January 20, 1987 – January 15, 1991 | Succeeded by vacant |
| Preceded by Janey Slaughter Briscoe | First Lady of Texas; January 16, 1979 – January 18, 1983 | Succeeded by Linda Gail White |
