= Marialice Shary Shivers =

American civic leader and philanthropist

First Lady of Texas
- In role July 11, 1949 – January 15, 1957
- Governor: Allan Shivers
- Preceded by: Mabel Buchanan Jester
- Succeeded by: Jean Houston Daniel

Personal details
- Born: Marialice Roettele; January 2, 1910 Omaha, Nebraska, U.S.
- Died: September 29, 1996 (aged 86) Austin, Texas, U.S.
- Resting place: Texas State Cemetery
- Spouse: Allan Shivers (m. 1937; died 1985)
- Children: 4
- Education: Our Lady of the Lake College (BA, 1932)
- Occupation: Civic leader, philanthropist

Marialice Shary Shivers (2 January 1910 – 29 September 1996) was an American civic leader and philanthropist who served as First Lady of Texas from 1949 to 1957 while her husband, Allan Shivers, was governor. She was known for directing a complete refurbishment of the Texas Governor's Mansion and later became an influential advocate for education, health care and the arts in the Rio Grande Valley and in Austin.

== Early life and education ==
Marialice Roettele was born in Omaha, Nebraska, to Charles and Anne O’Brien Roettele. In her teens, she was adopted by her maternal aunt and uncle, Mary O'Brien Shary and citrus pioneer John H. Shary, and moved to the Shary family estate near Mission, Texas. She attended schools in Omaha and Mission before enrolling at Our Lady of the Lake College in San Antonio, where she earned a Bachelor of Arts degree in 1932.

== Career ==
Shary married attorney and state senator Allan Shivers in Mission on October 5, 1937. When Lieutenant Governor Shivers succeeded to the governorship on July 11, 1949, she became First Lady of Texas and remained so until January 1957 after her husband’s record three elected terms. During those seven and a half years she personally supervised an extensive structural restoration and interior re-decoration of the Governor’s Mansion, oversaw its day-to-day management and used the residence to showcase Texas fine arts and crafts.

After leaving the mansion, Shivers turned to higher-education governance. In 1965 she joined the Board of Regents of Pan American University (now the University of Texas Rio Grande Valley) and chaired the board from 1974 to 1978, guiding its integration into the University of Texas System and championing expanded fine-arts and medical programmes for the border region.

== Philanthropy ==
Shivers was also active as a philanthropist. She helped found the Seton Development Board in Austin in 1973 and was a driving force behind the Marialice Shary Shivers Regional Neonatal Center at Seton Medical Center, dedicated in 1995. She and her husband endowed the Marialice Shary Shivers Chair in Fine Arts at Pan American University in 1975, and later donated funds and land that allowed construction of the campus's Marialice Shary Shivers Administration Building, opened in 1990. In Austin she served on boards or auxiliaries of the Laguna Gloria Art Museum, the Austin Symphony League, Junior Helping Hand, the Settlement Club and other cultural and social-service organisations.

== Personal life ==
The Shiverses made their principal home at Woodlawn, the historic Pease Mansion in west Austin, while maintaining close ties to the Rio Grande Valley and to Woodville, where the Allan Shivers Library and Museum preserves a Victorian parlour devoted to her life and charitable work. The couple had four children: John Shary Shivers, Mary Alice “Cissy” Shivers, Robert Allan “Bud” Shivers Jr. and Brian McGee Shivers. Marialice Shary Shivers died in Austin on September 29, 1996, and was buried beside her husband in the Texas State Cemetery.

== Awards and honours ==
Shivers was named one of Austin's Outstanding Women in 1980 and received numerous community citations, including "Outstanding Mother of the Year" from the Austin American-Statesman in 1983. In higher-education circles she was honoured by Pan American University with its first Presidential Medal in 1978 and by Our Lady of the Lake University as a distinguished alumna. Buildings, endowed chairs and scholarship programmes across the University of Texas System continue to carry her name.
