= 1845 Texas gubernatorial election =

- December 15, 1845
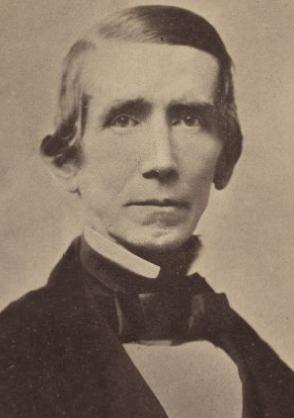

Nominee	James P. Henderson	James B. Miller
Party	Independent	Independent
Popular vote	8,190	1,672
Percentage	83.04%	16.96%
- County results Henderson: 50–60% 60–70% 70–80% 80–90% 90–100% Miller: 80–90% No Data/Vote
Governor-elect
James Pinckney Henderson

The 1845 Texas gubernatorial election was held on December 15, 1845, to elect the first governor of Texas. The election was held in preparation for the annexation of Texas by the United States. As such the election actually predated Texas' entry into the Union by 14 days. James Pinckney Henderson was elected over James B. Miller with 83% of the vote and became the first governor of the new state.

== General election ==
Organized political parties did not exist in the Republic, with factions generally revolving around presidents Sam Houston and Mirabeau B. Lamar. Both Henderson and Miller had served in Houston's cabinet during his times in office. The first political party in state history, the Democrats, would not be organized for another year and both candidates ran nominally independent campaigns.

=== Candidates ===
- James Pinckney Henderson, former Republic of Texas minister to the United Kingdom and France
- James B. Miller, physician, Secretary of the Treasury of the Republic of Texas, former chief justice of Fort Bend County, delegate at the Conventions of 1833 and 1845

=== Results ===
1845 Texas gubernatorial election (Note: Sources differ as to the vote totals in 1845. The Texas Almanac gives the votes as 7,853 (81.99%) for Henderson, 1,673 (17.47%) for Miller, and 52 (0.54%) Scattering. Micheal J. Dubin's United States Gubernatorial Elections, 1776 1860 gives the totals as reflected in official state records and these are shown below, however his own results by county add up to 6,321 (82.62%) for Henderson, 1,324 (17.30%) for Miller, and 6 (0.08%) for Thomas Pillsbury.)
Party	Candidate	Votes	%
Independent	James Pinckney Henderson	8,190	83.04%
Independent	James B. Miller	1,672	16.96%
Total votes		9,862	100.00%

==== By county ====
1845 Texas gubernatorial election by county
County (Note: The totals in this list do not add up to the official tabulation of the vote in the Journal of the Texas House of Representatives, February 17, 1846. The total according to the Journal is at the bottom of this list, however.)	James P. Henderson		James B. Miller		Timothy Pillsbury		Margin		Total
County	#	%	#	%	#	%	#	%	Total
Austin	99	53.2%	87	46.8%	0	0.0%	12	6.4%	186
Bowie	299	73.1%	110	26.9%	0	0.0%	189	46.2%	409
Brazoria	96	100.0%	0	0.0%	0	0.0%	96	100.0%	96
Brazos*	45	54.9%	37	45.1%	0	0.0%	8	9.8%	82
Colorado	218	89.7%	25	10.3%	0	0.0%	193	70.4%	243
Fort Bend	23	16.0%	121	84.0%	0	0.0%	98	68.0%	144
Galveston	334	96.3%	13	3.7%	0	0.0%	321	92.6%	347
Harris	318	57.4%	236	42.6%	0	0.0%	82	14.8%	554
Harrison	120	96.0%	0	0.0%	5	4.0%	116	92.0%	125
Houston	331	98.8%	4	1.2%	0	0.0%	327	97.6%	335
Jackson*	74	79.6%	19	20.4%	0	0.0%	55	59.2%	93
Jasper	201	91.8%	18	8.2%	0	0.0%	183	83.6%	219
Lamar	331	99.1%	3	0.9%	0	0.0%	328	98.2%	334
Matagorda	106	67.5%	51	32.5%	0	0.0%	55	35.0%	157
Milam	152	74.5%	52	25.5%	0	0.0%	100	49.0%	204
Montgomery	541	73.1%	199	26.9%	0	0.0%	342	46.2%	740
Nacogdoches	711	99.9%	0	0.0%	1	0.1%	710	99.8%	712
Red River	449	98.0%	9	2.0%	0	0.0%	440	96.0%	458
Robertson	276	83.6%	54	16.4%	0	0.0%	222	67.2%	330
Rusk	271	100.0%	0	0.0%	0	0.0%	271	100.0%	271
Sabine	250	96.2%	10	3.8%	0	0.0%	240	92.4%	260
San Augustine	256	95.9%	11	4.1%	0	0.0%	245	91.8%	267
San Patricio	111	91.7%	10	8.3%	0	0.0%	101	83.4%	121
Shelby	375	90.4%	40	9.6%	0	0.0%	335	86.8%	415
Travis	185	86.0%	30	14.0%	0	0.0%	155	72.0%	215
Victoria	66	62.3%	40	37.7%	0	0.0%	26	24.6%	106
Washington	202	50.1%	201	49.9%	0	0.0%	1	0.2%	403
Totals	8,190	83.0%	1,672	17.0%	0	0.0%	6,518	66.0%	9,862

* counties whose results were not included in the official tabulation

== See also ==
- 1844 Republic of Texas presidential election, the last presidential election in the Republic of Texas
