= J. Pinckney Henderson =

Governor of Texas from 1846 to 1847

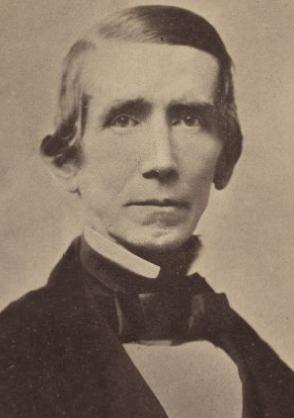

United States Senator from Texas
- In office November 9, 1857 – June 4, 1858
- Appointed by: Elisha M. Pease
- Preceded by: Thomas Jefferson Rusk
- Succeeded by: Matthias Ward

1st Governor of Texas
- In office February 19, 1846 – December 21, 1847
- Lieutenant: Albert Clinton Horton
- Preceded by: Anson Jones (as president of the Republic of Texas)
- Succeeded by: George Tyler Wood

Minister to the United Kingdom and France Republic of Texas
- In office 1837–1840

Personal details
- Born: James Pinckney Henderson; March 31, 1808 Lincolnton, North Carolina, U.S.
- Died: June 4, 1858 (aged 50) Washington, D.C., U.S.
- Party: Democratic
- Spouse: Frances Cox (m. 1839)
- Children: 5
- Education: University of North Carolina
- Occupation: Lawyer; diplomat

James Pinckney Henderson (March 31, 1808 – June 4, 1858) was an American and Texan lawyer, politician, and soldier who served as the first governor of Texas from 1846 to 1847.

== Early life ==
He was born in Lincolnton, North Carolina, on March 31, 1808, to Lawson Henderson and his wife, Elizabeth Carruth Henderson. His birthplace Woodside, was listed on the National Register of Historic Places in 1973. After graduating from Pleasant Retreat Academy, Henderson enrolled as a law student at the University of North Carolina. Upon his graduation, he studied 18 hours a day to pass his bar examination, and was admitted to the North Carolina State Bar in 1829.

== Military service and move to Texas ==
After becoming a lawyer, Henderson served in the North Carolina militia, rising to colonel. In 1835, Colonel Henderson moved to Canton, Mississippi, where he opened a law practice. He enslaved people.

His attention soon turned to Texas' struggle against Mexico. Henderson began making speeches to raise money and an army to go to the aid of the Texas cause. Henderson and several volunteers traveled to Texas hoping to participate in the fight for independence, but by the time the group arrived in June 1836, many major events had already occurred. The Texas Declaration of Independence had already been signed on March 2, David G. Burnet was elected interim President of the new Republic of Texas on March 10, and Antonio López de Santa Anna had already signed the Treaties of Velasco, agreeing to withdraw his troops from Texas. For his efforts, Interim President Burnet commissioned Henderson as a brigadier general in the Texas Army, with orders to return to North Carolina to raise troops to serve in Texas, which Henderson followed at his own expense.

== Government service in the Republic ==
Sam Houston became President of the Republic of Texas on September 5, 1836, and appointed Henderson the republic's attorney general. In December of that same year, Henderson was named by Houston to replace recently deceased Stephen F. Austin as secretary of state for the republic. In early 1837, Houston decreed Henderson as minister from the Republic of Texas to France at the Tuileries Palace and to England at the Court of St. James's. During his tenure as minister, he was successful in securing the recognition of the independence of the Republic of Texas and negotiated trade agreements with both countries.

== Governor of Texas, war with Mexico, United States Senator ==
In 1840, Henderson returned to Texas and set up a private law practice in San Augustine. He was sent to Washington, DC, in 1844 to work in coordination with Isaac Van Zandt to secure the annexation of Texas to the United States. Although the annexation treaty was signed, it was rejected by the United States Senate; Henderson was recalled to Texas. An annexation treaty approved by the United States Senate was finally passed on December 29, 1845.

In preparation for anticipated statehood, the Texas gubernatorial election, 1845, elected Henderson as its first governor. He took office on February 19, 1846. When the Mexican–American War broke out in April of that year, Henderson took a leave of absence as governor to command a Texas volunteer cavalry division. He served with the rank of major general under Zachary Taylor. He returned home to resume his duties as governor but did not run for a second term. He later served in the United States Senate from November 9, 1857, until his death on June 4, 1858.

== Personal life and death ==
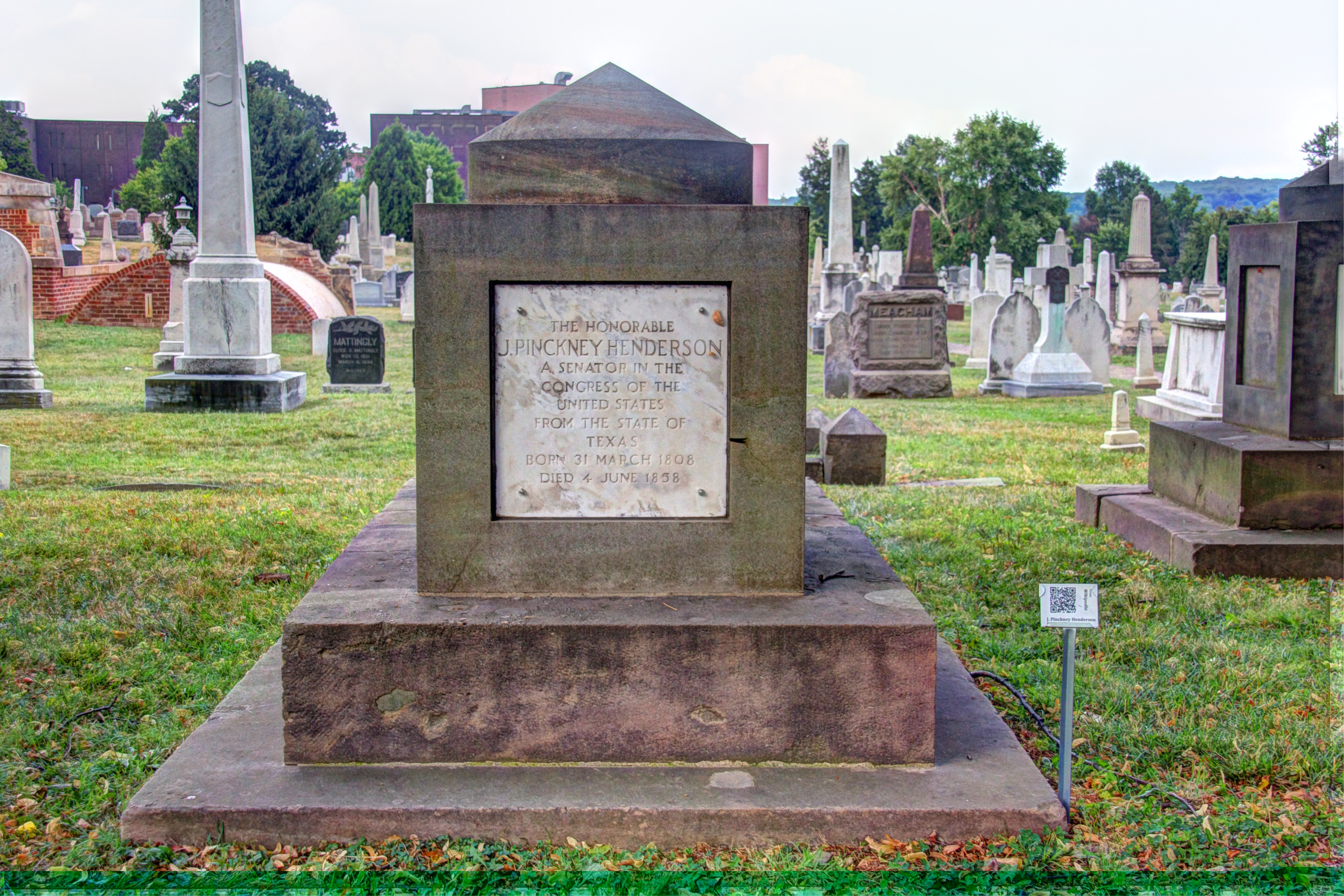
Henderson's cenotaph at the Congressional Cemetery in Washington, DC

Henderson met his future wife, Frances Cox, when he represented the Republic of Texas as a minister to France and England. Cox was born in Philadelphia, Pennsylvania, and educated in Europe. She was a multilingual literary translator. On October 30, 1839, they were wed at St George's, Hanover Square. In 1840, the new couple established a residence and law office in San Augustine, Texas. The couple had five children: daughters Martha, Fanny, and Julia lived to adulthood.

Henderson died from tuberculosis in Washington, D.C., in 1858, while serving as a senator for the State of Texas. He is buried at the Texas State Cemetery. After his death, during the Civil War years, his widow and daughters moved to Europe. Martha died at age 18. Fanny married into the Austrian aristocracy. Julia married an American sugar plantation owner. Frances Cox Henderson died in 1897 and is buried at Rosedale Cemetery in New Jersey, where she lived with daughter Julia and son-in-law Edward White Adams.

== Legacy ==
Henderson County, which was established in 1846, and the city of Henderson, founded in 1843 in Rusk County, are named in his honor. James Pinckney Henderson Elementary School, in Houston, is named for him.

== See also ==
- List of members of the United States Congress who died in office (1790–1899)

Party political offices
First	Democratic nominee for Governor of Texas; 1845	Vacant Title next held by Hardin Richard Runnels
Diplomatic posts
New title Mission established	Texas Minister to the United Kingdom and France; 1837-1842	Succeeded by Ashbel Smith
Political offices
New title State admitted to Union	Governor of Texas; 1846-1847	Succeeded by George Tyler Wood
U.S. Senate
Preceded by Thomas J. Rusk	United States Senator for Texas; 1857–1858; Served alongside: Sam Houston	Succeeded by Matthias Ward
