= 1844 Republic of Texas presidential election =

- September 2, 1844
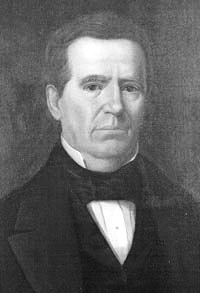

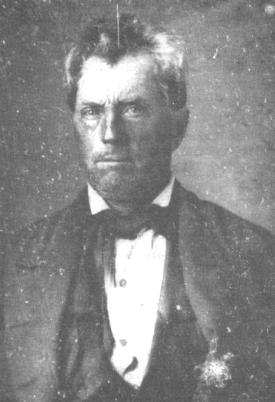
Nominee	Anson Jones	Edward Burleson
Party	Nonpartisan	Nonpartisan
Popular vote	7,037	5,661
Percentage	55.2%	44.4%
President before election
Sam Houston
Nonpartisan
Elected President
Anson Jones
Nonpartisan

The 1844 Republic of Texas presidential election was the fourth and last presidential election. It was held on September 2, 1844. The contest was held between Anson Jones and Edward Burleson, the vice president of the Republic of Texas. Jones defeated Burleson by a margin of 1,376 votes to become the fourth and final President of Texas.

On December 29, 1845, one year and three months after the election, the Republic of Texas was annexed by the United States and was admitted as its 28th state.

== See also ==
- 1845 Texas gubernatorial election, the first gubernatorial election in the State of Texas
