= Cecilia Phalen Abbott =

First Lady of Texas since 2015

Cecilia Abbott
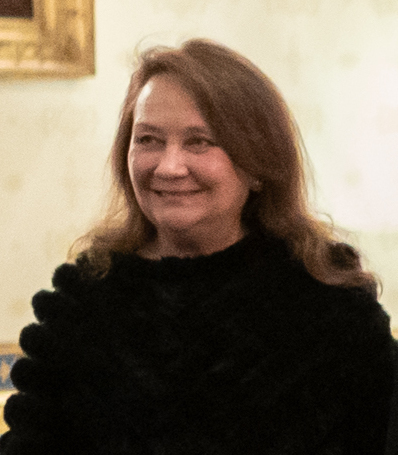
- Abbott in 2020

First Lady of Texas
- Current
- Assumed role January 20, 2015
- Governor: Greg Abbott
- Preceded by: Anita Thigpen Perry

Personal details
- Born: Cecilia Phalen; November 13, 1959 (age 66) Houston, Texas, U.S.
- Party: Republican
- Spouse: Greg Abbott (m. 1981)
- Children: 1
- Education: University of Texas at Austin; University of St. Thomas (BA, MEd, MA)

Cecilia Phalen Abbott (née Phalen; born November 13, 1959) is the First Lady of Texas since 2015, as she is married to the Governor of Texas Greg Abbott. She is also the first Hispanic First Lady of Texas.

== Early life and education ==
Cecilia Phalen was born on November 13, 1959 in Houston, TX. Abbott was raised in San Antonio, Texas by her parents, both of whom were educators, and she had three siblings. Abbott graduated from Thomas Jefferson High School. She then attended the University of Texas at Austin, where she met her future husband, Greg Abbott. She later attended the University of St. Thomas, where she received a bachelor's degree in psychology, a master's degree in education, and a master's degree in theology.

== Career ==
Abbott has been a principal at various Catholic schools in Texas; most recently, she served as principal of Cathedral School of Saint Mary in Austin between 1996 and 2001. She later worked in the health care industry as a managing director of Community Relations for a senior adult health care company. Throughout her career, she has served on various boards and organizations. Abbott took the position of First Lady of Texas on January 20, 2015, succeeding Anita Thigpen Perry. Abbott is the first Hispanic First Lady of Texas as the granddaughter of Leonara and Augustin Segura, who settled in San Antonio from Mexico before 1935. Abbott is a Republican.

== Personal life ==
In 1981, she married Abbott, with whom she shares a birthday. They have one adopted daughter, Audrey. The Abbott family lives in the Texas Governors Mansion in Austin, Texas. They have three dogs: Pancake, known as the First Dog of Texas, Peaches, known as the First Puppy of Texas, and Honey Butter Chicken Biscuit.
