= Linda Gale White =

First Lady of Texas from 1983 to 1987

First Lady of Texas
- In role January 18, 1983 – January 20, 1987
- Governor: Mark W. White Jr.
- Preceded by: Rita Clements
- Succeeded by: Rita Clements

Personal details
- Born: Linda Gale Thompson; June 13, 1942 (age 84) Dallas County, Texas, U.S.
- Spouse: Mark W. White Jr. (m. 1966; died 2017)
- Children: 3
- Education: Baylor University (BBA)
- Occupation: Educator, civic leader

Linda Gale Thompson White (born June 13, 1942) is an American educator and civic leader who served as the first lady of Texas from January 18, 1983, to January 20, 1987, during the administration of Governor Mark W. White Jr.

== Early life and education ==
White was born in Dallas County and raised in Irving, the eldest child of Robert L. and Lisa Marie Thompson. She graduated from Irving public schools and earned a Bachelor of Business Administration from Baylor University in 1964. She married Mark White in 1966 while he was completing studies at Baylor Law School.

== Career ==
White began her career teaching English at Johnston High School in Austin and later in the Houston public‑school system.

=== First lady of Texas (1983–1987) ===
As first lady, she helped introduce the Communities In Schools (CIS) dropout‑prevention model to Texas, overseeing its initial rollout in five cities. In February 1984, she toured Paris, Ennis, Belton, Brownwood and Goliad to launch Texas Main Street preservation projects that linked historic conservation with economic development. In October 1986, she spoke at the University of Texas at Tyler on statewide education reforms. That month, she also presented the Texas Employment Awards recognizing inclusive workplaces.
