= Mildred Paxton Moody =

American politician

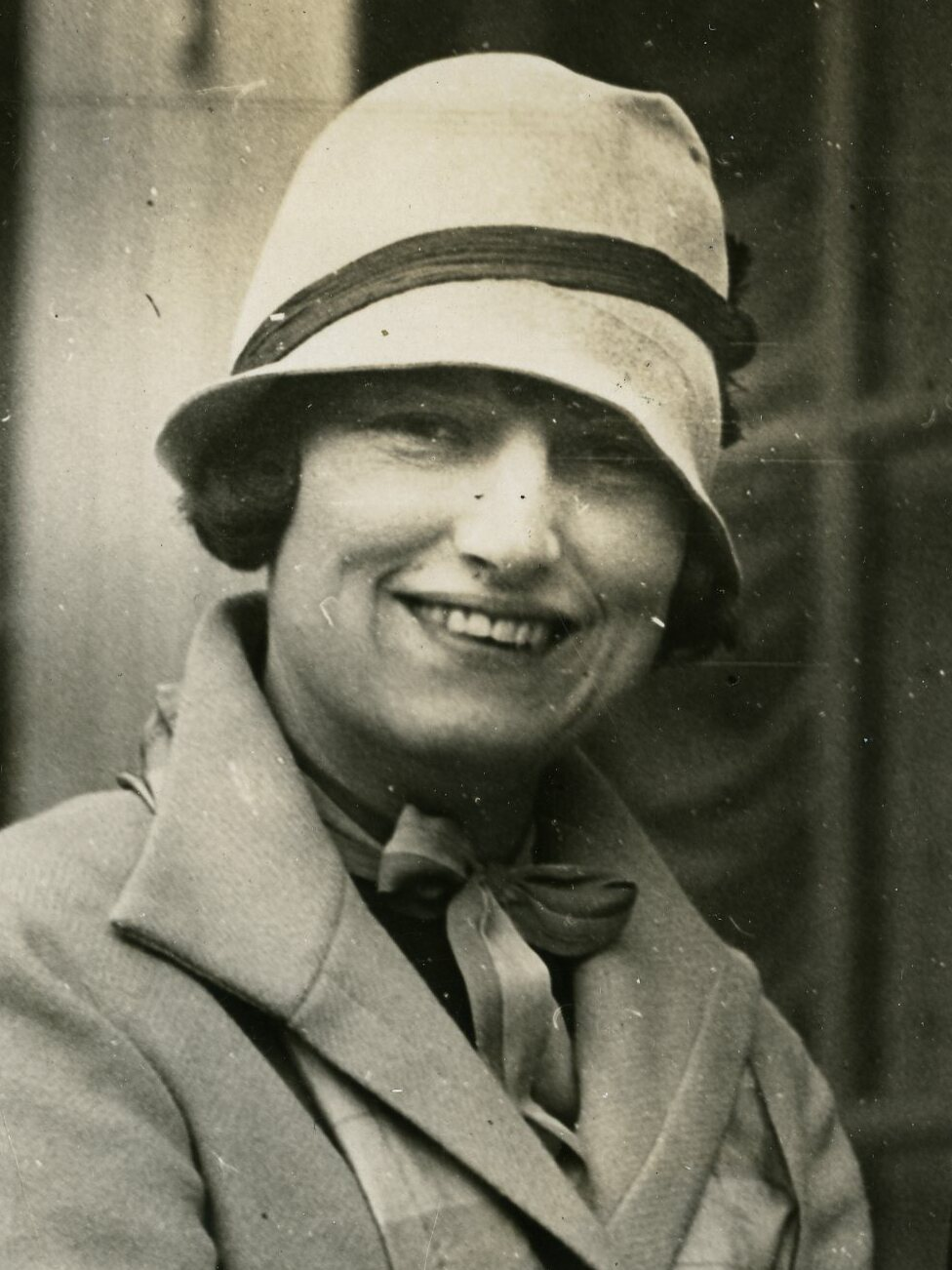

First Lady of Texas
- In role January 17, 1927 – January 20, 1931
- Governor: Dan Moody
- Preceded by: James E. Ferguson (Note: as first gentleman)
- Succeeded by: Maud Gage Sterling

Personal details
- Born: April 20, 1897 Abilene, Texas, US
- Died: March 1, 1983 (aged 85) Austin, Texas, US
- Resting place: Texas State Cemetery
- Spouse: Daniel J. Moody Jr. (m. 1926; died 1966)
- Education: Hardin–Simmons University (BA); University of Texas at Austin (MA); Columbia University
- Known for: First Lady of Texas (1927–1931); Preservation of the Texas Governor's Mansion

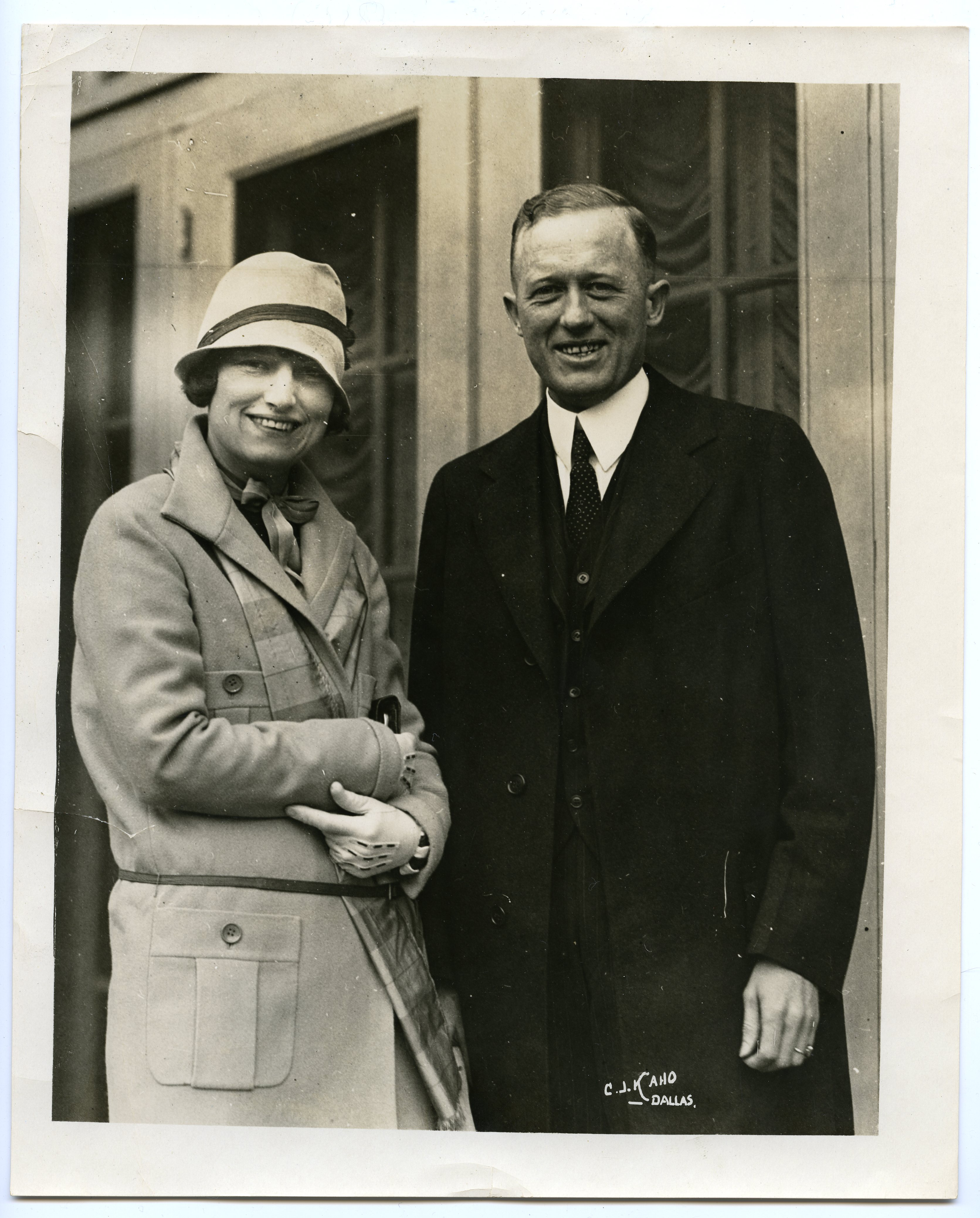
Mildred Paxton and Dan Moody

Mildred Paxton Moody (April 20, 1897 – March 1, 1983) was the wife of Texas Governor Dan Moody. Upon her recommendation the 42nd Texas Legislature established the Board of Mansion Supervisors in 1931, with Mrs. Moody as the first head of the Board. Until its abolishment in 1965, the Board oversaw all interior and exterior upkeep and enhancements to the Texas Governor's Mansion.

== Early life ==
She was born Mildred Paxton in Abilene, Texas on April 20, 1897, to banker George Paxton and his wife Mathilde Warren Paxton. With a B.A. from Hardin-Simmons and an M.A. from the University of Texas, she was the women's editor for the Abilene Reporter-News while also teaching at Hardin-Simmons. Moody also received a degree from Columbia University. During her enrollment at the University of Texas, Moody had been one of the editors at The Daily Texan student newspaper.

== First Lady of Texas ==
Her marriage to Texas politician Dan Moody was on April 20, 1926, on her 29th birthday. Months later on election night, her new husband defeated the sitting Governor Miriam Ferguson. The 73-year-old Governor's Mansion was in a state of neglect and disrepair when the Moodys moved in. Mrs. Moody appealed to the state Board of Control, and was granted monies to renovate the State Dining Room. For additional renovations and structural improvements, she received funding from her father. The lengthy process of bringing the mansion up to livable modern standards left her determined to convince the State of Texas to provide regular funding for the mansion's future. After her husband's term expired in 1931, she authored a perspective of her tenure as the First Lady of Texas for The Dallas Morning News, including her recommendation that an entity needed to be created to oversee the mansion's upkeep. When the Forty-second Texas Legislature created the Board of Mansion Supervisors shortly after her recommendation, Governor Ross Sterling appointed her to head the board.

== Final years ==
Governor and Mrs. Moody spent their remaining years in Austin. The couple had two children, Daniel Jr. and Nancy. Dan Moody died in 1966 and was buried at the Texas State Cemetery. Mildred outlived him by 17 years, dying in 1983. She is buried next to him.

== Notes ==
Honorary titles
Preceded by James E. Ferguson	First Lady of Texas; 1927–1931	Succeeded by Maud Abbie Gage Sterling
