= St. Mark's Episcopal Church (West Orange, New Jersey) =

Historic church in New Jersey, United States

- U.S. National Register of Historic Places
- New Jersey Register of Historic Places
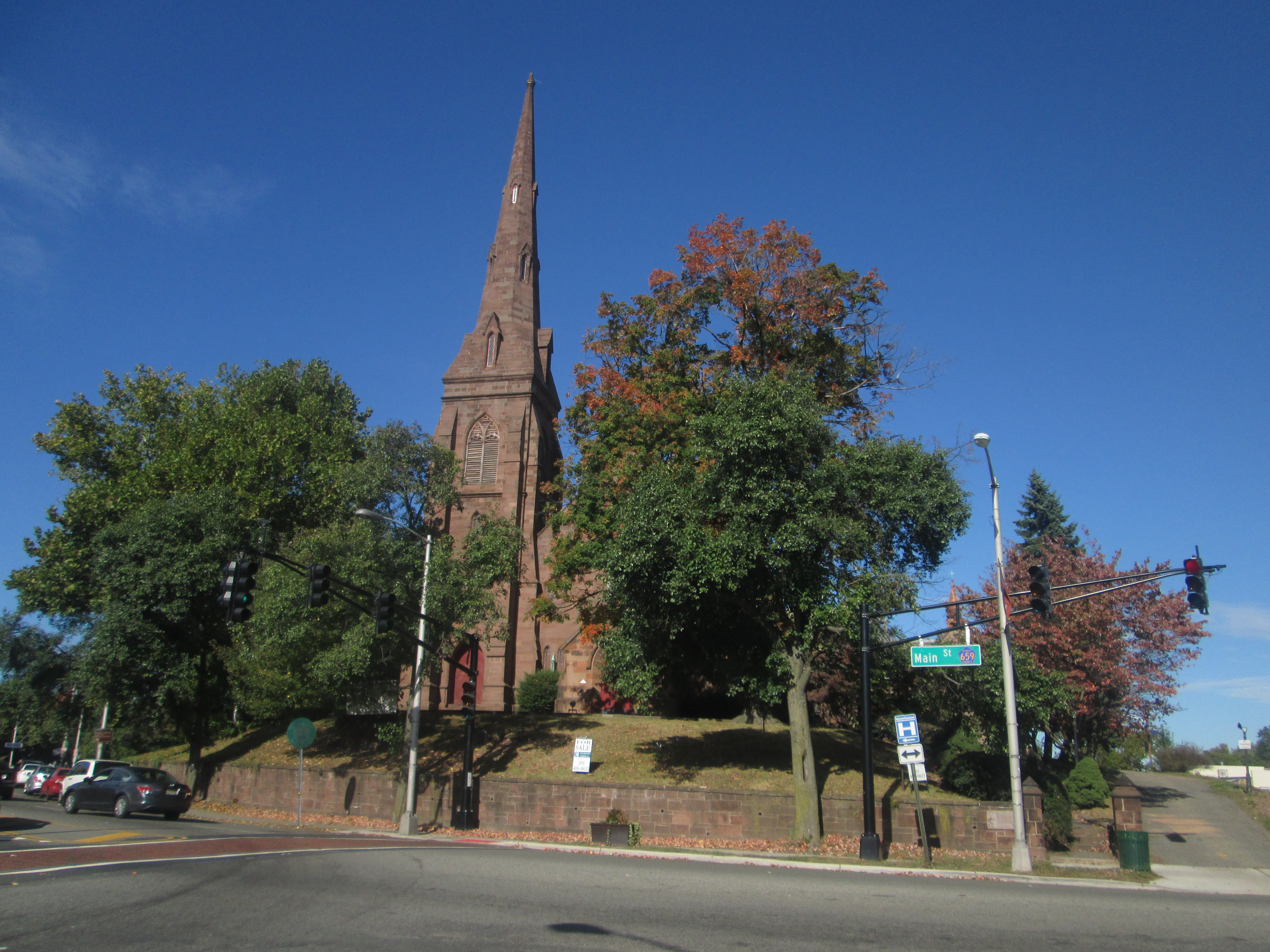
- The former St. Mark's Episcopal Church as seen from Main Street in October 2013.

- Location within Essex County, New Jersey Location within New Jersey Location within the United States
- Location: 13 Main Street, West Orange, New Jersey
- Coordinates: 40°46′37″N 74°14′20″W
- Area: 2.5 acres (1.0 ha)
- Built: 1828
- Architects: Upjohn, Richard M.
- Architectural style: Gothic Revival
- NRHP reference No.: 77000868
- NJRHP No.
- Added to NRHP: September 22, 1977

St. Mark's Episcopal Church is a historic church located at 13 Main Street at Valley Road in West Orange, Essex County, New Jersey, United States. After the Episcopal congregation dwindled, the building subsequently housed the Primera Iglesia Evangelica Metodista Libra de los Oranges, a Methodist congregation. The building's interior was destroyed, and exterior badly damaged, by fire on January 1, 2016.

The church was called an "outstanding example of Gothic Revival architecture" by Preservation New Jersey, and was listed as one of the ten most endangered historic sites in New Jersey in 1996. It has been said that the building "represents the beginning and the end of the ecclesiological style in the United States." The Ecclesiological style movement in church architecture advocated Gothic revival architecture using theological arguments.

== History ==
The original Episcopal congregation was founded in 1828 as an offshoot of Trinity Parish in Newark. Within a few decades it had become the largest and wealthiest Episcopal congregation in and around "The Oranges" of New Jersey.

Work on the brownstone main church began in 1828. An addition completed in 1860–1861, including the steeple, is attributed to architect Richard Upjohn.

St. Mark's ran the first elementary school in West Orange beginning in 1865. This school building was destroyed by fire in 1926. It also ran the first high school in West Orange, which graduated a class of nine students in 1893. A new high school building was opened in 1898, which was destroyed by fire on February 27, 1913.

The parish prospered until the 1960s, when declining attendance led to mounting financial hardships. The church was added to the National Register of Historic Places in 1977, but the church and its adjacent cemetery fell into disrepair. In 2004, the Episcopal Diocese of Newark leased it to Lamb of God Fellowship, a Renewal congregation, for what was intended to be a long-term stay, but the Fellowship left in 2009 due to the high cost of maintaining the property. The cross atop the structure was shaken loose in the 2011 earthquake and fell to the ground. The Diocese sold the property to another religious organization in early 2015.

The church caught fire on January 1, 2016 around 5 a.m. (1000 UTC) and was ablaze for three hours. No injuries were reported in the historic church.

Update: January 1, 2017. The church currently in the construction phase of being fully restored by architects Zachary Gidich and David Sepulveda. [Zachary Gidich Architecture + Design]

== See also ==
- National Register of Historic Places listings in Essex County, New Jersey
