= Anita Thigpen Perry =

First Lady of Texas (2000–2015)

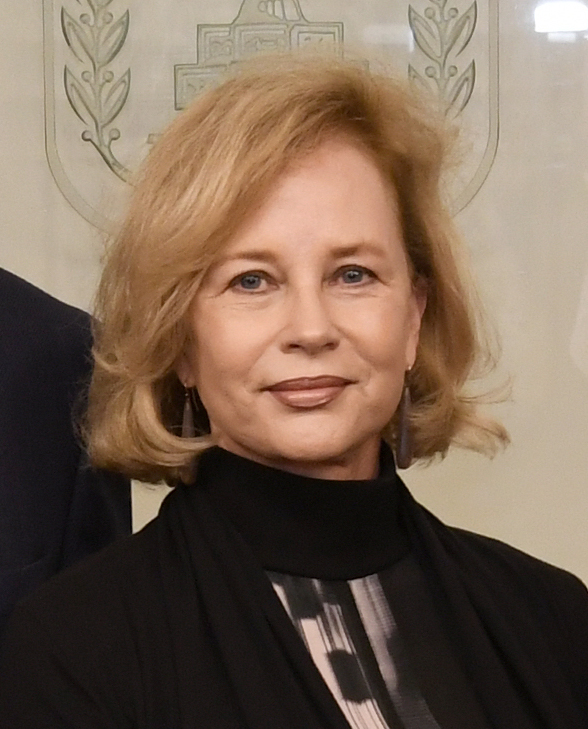
- Perry in 2019

First Lady of Texas
- In role December 21, 2000 – January 20, 2015
- Governor: Rick Perry
- Preceded by: Laura Bush
- Succeeded by: Cecilia Abbott

Second Lady of Texas
- In role January 19, 1999 – December 21, 2000
- Lieutenant Governor: Rick Perry
- Preceded by: Gloria Bullock
- Succeeded by: Sally Ratliff

Personal details
- Born: Mary Anita Thigpen; May 5, 1952 (age 74) Haskell, Texas, U.S.
- Party: Republican
- Spouse: Rick Perry (m. 1982)
- Children: 2
- Education: Texas Tech University; West Texas A&M University (BS); UT Health San Antonio (MS)

Mary Anita Thigpen Perry (born May 5, 1952) is an American nurse who was the longest-serving First Lady of Texas, being in that role from 2000 to 2015. She is married to former Texas Governor Rick Perry. As First Lady of Texas, she had been an active advocate for nursing and other health care issues.

The Anita Thigpen Perry Endowment at the University of Texas Health Science Center at San Antonio focuses on nutrition, cardiovascular disease, health education, and early childhood development. In 2008, the Anita Thigpen Perry School of Nursing at Texas Tech University Health Sciences Center was renamed in her honor.

== Early life and education ==
Perry was born in Haskell, Texas. She is the youngest daughter of family physician Joseph Eltidge Thigpen (1920–2013), a native of Bay Springs, Mississippi, and homemaker Beunis Fay Ratliff Thigpen, originally from Haskell. Her parents met in Tyler, where Beunis was visiting relatives. Her father had a distinguished flight record in World War II and earned several medals, including the Bronze Star. He also flew his own plane and was known for making house calls long after the practice ceased to be the norm. Her paternal grandfather was also a doctor and also named Joseph Thigpen. She is named for a paternal aunt, Anita Thigpen Yelverton (1918–1999). She had three siblings: Joseph Emmitt Thigpen (1945–2013), an attorney in Austin who is a former county attorney and former district attorney), Peggy Hairgrove, and Emily Solis. Like Rick, she is a graduate of Haskell High School. She spent her first year of college at Texas Tech University, but because they did not have a nursing program at the time, she switched to West Texas State University in Canyon, where she received a bachelor's degree in nursing in 1974. She then obtained a Master of Science degree in nursing from the University of Texas Health Science Center at San Antonio. She worked in the nursing profession for more than 17 years, including surgery, pediatrics, intensive care, administration, and teaching and as a consultant. she married in 1982 and has 2 adult children

== First Lady of Texas ==
Perry became First Lady of Texas in 2000 when Rick became governor after the resignation of President-elect George W. Bush. He previously served for two years as lieutenant governor.

In October 2000, she and Rick hosted the first Texas Conference for Women which became an annual event. The conference addresses such issues as professional development, health care, and personal growth.

Texas Tech University Health Sciences Center renamed its nursing school in Perry's honor on August 22, 2008, and two nursing endowments are also set up in her name: the Anita Thigpen Perry Nursing Excellence Scholarship at West Texas A&M University and the Anita Thigpen Perry Endowment at the University of Texas at San Antonio.
