= Good Shepherd Homes =

British charity

Good Shepherd Homes is a British charity which provides care for street children and orphans in West India. The charity also has registered charity status in India and the United States. The main bases of the organisation are found in the cities of Pune, Talegaon, Parandhwadi and Nasik. Good Shepherd Homes (GSH) operates in small units of twelve children, staffed by house parents.

== Origins ==
GSH’s first homes were founded in 1996 in India in Pune, Maharashtra. Large numbers of street children are still found in both Pune, Mumbai, and other Indian cities. The charity seeks, together with other organisations, to give children the necessary accommodation, care and education that they would otherwise do without. A number of children in the care of Good Shepherd Homes came directly out of child labour at the time of admission. Some children were occupied as beggars, whilst others were employed as hotel staff or cleaners.

== Street children ==
Approximately 18 million street children and orphans survive on India‘s streets. Many of these children are born in, or migrate to, India's urban centres. Pune has about 8.000 street children, and Mumbai, with a population of over 20 million inhabitants, has close to 100.000 street children. These children improvise a living by begging, collecting and selling scrap and waste, brushing shoes and other forms of child labour.

GSH does not receive fees from the children under its care or their family members, and is exclusively supported by donations and free will contributions. Presently the charity houses 110 children and employs 35 full-time staff.

== Victoria Terminus and new construction development ==
Good Shepherd Homes produced a 40-minute film called 'Victoria Terminus' in 2009. The documentary film, which deals with the plight of street children in Mumbai, was screened numerous times including at three Unchosen film events in Bristol and at the Keele University

Good Shepherd Homes constructed a residential project consisting of eight buildings with a capacity for 430 children and 80 staff members during 2014 and 2015. The facility is to be opened in 2016.
