= Texas Governor's Mansion =

Historic house in Texas, United States

- U.S. National Register of Historic Places
- U.S. National Historic Landmark
- Texas State Antiquities Landmark
- Recorded Texas Historic Landmark
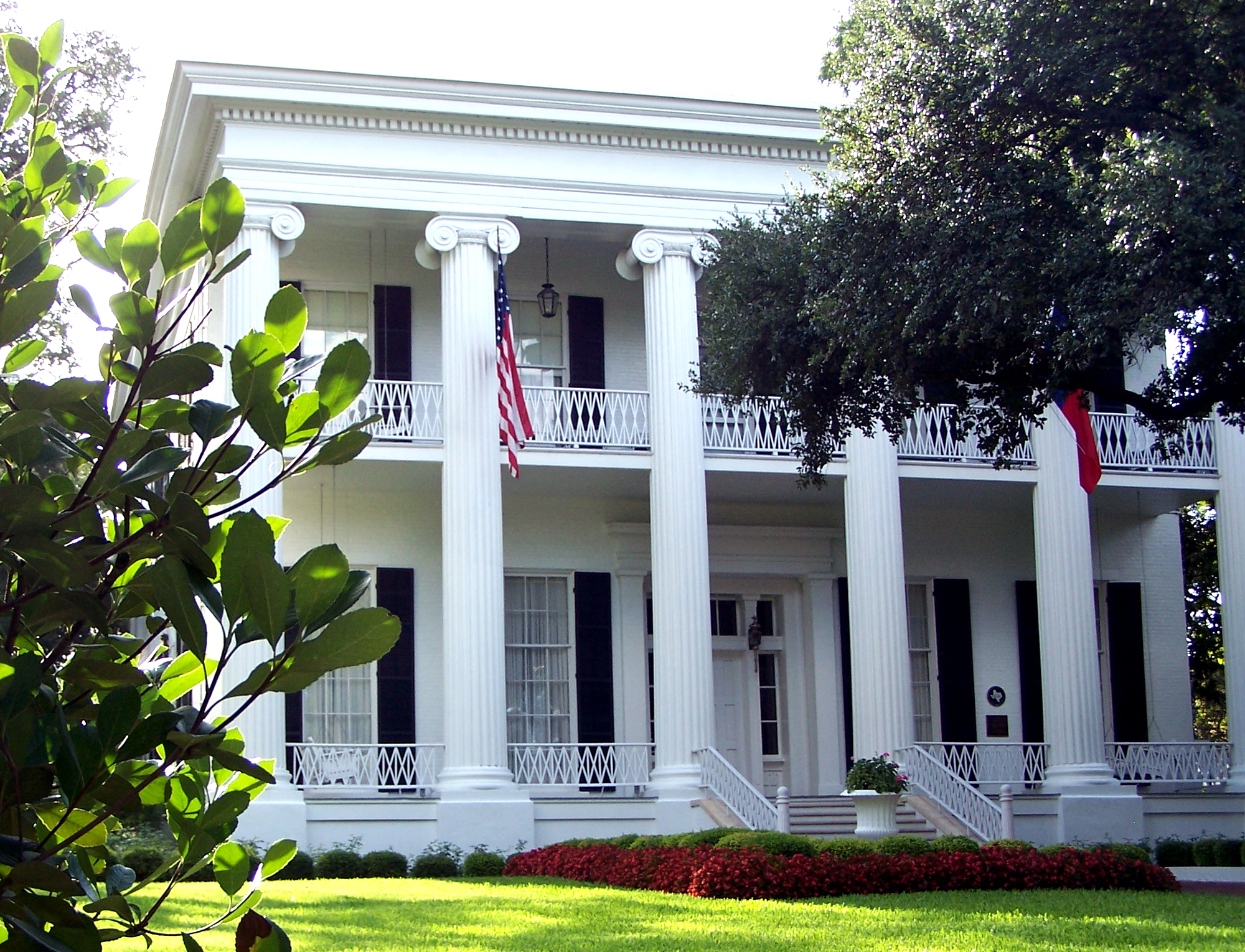
- The Texas Governor's Mansion in 2006.

- Location within Texas Location within the United States
- Interactive map showing the location of Texas Governors' Mansion
- Location: 1010 Colorado St., Austin, Texas, USA
- Coordinates: 30°16′21.72″N 97°44′34.79″W
- Built: 1854
- Architect: Abner Cook
- Architectural style: Greek Revival
- NRHP reference No.: 70000896
- TSAL No.: 613
- RTHL No.: 13932

Significant dates
- Added to NRHP: August 25, 1970
- Designated NHL: December 2, 1974
- Designated TSAL: May 28, 1981
- Designated RTHL: 1962

The Texas Governor's Mansion is a historic home for the governor of Texas in downtown Austin, Texas. Designed by prominent architect Abner Cook, it was built in 1854 and has been the home of every governor since 1856. Governor Greg Abbott and First Lady Cecilia Phalen Abbott are the current residents.

On June 8, 2008, while midway through a major renovation, the mansion was badly damaged by an arson fire.

== History ==
The mansion is the oldest continuously inhabited house in Texas and fourth oldest governor's mansion in the United States that has been continuously occupied by a chief executive. The mansion was the first-designated Texas historic landmark, in 1962. It was listed in the National Register of Historic Places as "Governor's Mansion" in 1970, and further was declared a U.S. National Historic Landmark in 1974.

== Original architecture ==
Built by Abner Cook in a Greek Revival style and completed in 1856, the building occupies the center of a block and is surrounded by trees and gardens. The original mansion was 6,000 square feet (560 m^{2}). Remodeling in 1914 increased the size of the mansion to 8,920 square feet (829 m^{2}). The original mansion had 11 rooms but no bathrooms. The remodeling brought the room count to 25 rooms and seven bathrooms. In 1931, at the recommendation of former Texas First Lady Mildred Paxton Moody, the Texas Legislature established the Board of Mansion Supervisors to oversee all interior and exterior upkeep and enhancements to the mansion. The Board was abolished in 1965, and its responsibilities transferred to the Texas Commission on the Arts.

== 2008 fire ==
The mansion was partially destroyed by a four-alarm fire during the early morning of June 8, 2008, caused by a Molotov cocktail. Governor Rick Perry and his wife Anita Thigpen Perry were in Europe at the time of the fire. They had relocated in October 2007 for a $10 million major deferred maintenance project that began in January 2008. The project was to include a fire suppression system. State Fire Marshal Paul Maldonado said the next Sunday that investigators had evidence that an arsonist targeted the 152-year-old building.

On February 17, 2011, Texas Department of Public Safety Director Steve McCraw announced that two persons of interest had been identified as the arsonists. However, ultimately no one was charged with a crime resulting from the fire. According to Travis County Assistant District Attorney Gregg Cox, who led the arson investigation, the ten-year statute of limitations on felony arson in Texas has since expired, saying "chances are, they got away with it."

In May 2009, $22 million was allocated to the restoration of the Governor's Mansion, $11 million of which came from the American Recovery and Reinvestment Act of 2009. An additional $3.4 million was raised through private fund raising. The restoration was completed in 2012.

== See also ==
- National Register of Historic Places in Travis County, Texas
- List of National Historic Landmarks in Texas
