= Republic of Texas =

Country in North America (1836–1846)

Republic of Texas República de Tejas (Spanish)
- 1836–1846
- Top: Flag (1836–1839); Bottom: Flag (1839–1845) Top: Seal (1836–1839); Bottom: Seal (1839–1845)
- Motto: "Remember the Alamo"
- Map of the Republic of Texas. Since the Republic was not recognized by Mexico, its entire territory was disputed. The area that was controlled by the Republic is in dark green, while the territory claimed by the Republic but not effectively controlled is in light green.
- Capital: San Antonio de Bexar (Mexican Texas); San Felipe de Austin (1835, provisional); Washington-on-the-Brazos (1836, interim); Harrisburg (1836, interim); Galveston (1836, interim); Velasco (1836, interim); Columbia (1836–1837); Houston (1837–1839); Austin (1839–1846)
- Official languages: English and Spanish
- Other languages: German, French, Portuguese, Native languages (Caddo, Comanche)
- Demonyms: Texian and Tejano
- Government: Unitary presidential republic
- President^{1}
  - 1836: David G. Burnet
  - 1836–1838: Sam Houston, 1st term
  - 1838–1841: Mirabeau B. Lamar
  - 1841–1844: Sam Houston, 2nd term
  - 1844–1846: Anson Jones
- Vice President^{1}
  - 1836: Lorenzo de Zavala
  - 1836–1838: Mirabeau B. Lamar
  - 1838–1841: David G. Burnet
  - 1841–1844: Edward Burleson
  - 1844–1845: Kenneth L. Anderson
- Legislature: Congress
  - Upper house: Senate
  - Lower house: House of Representatives
- Historical era: Western Expansion
  - Independence from Mexico: March 2, 1836
  - Annexation by the United States: December 29, 1845
  - Transfer of power: February 19, 1846

Population
  - 1845 est.: 135,000
- Currency: Texas dollar
Preceded by
Coahuila y Tejas
Centralist Republic of Mexico
Succeeded by
Texas
New Mexico Territory
Utah Territory
Public Land Strip
Nebraska Territory
Kansas Territory
- Today part of: United States; ∟Colorado; ∟Kansas; ∟Oklahoma; ∟New Mexico; ∟Texas; ∟Wyoming
- ^{1}Interim period (March 16 – October 22, 1836): President: David G. Burnet, Vice President Lorenzo de Zavala

The Republic of Texas (Spanish: República de Tejas), or simply Texas, was a short-lived sovereign country in North America from March 2, 1836, to February 19, 1846. Texas was bordered by Mexico to the west and southwest, the Gulf of Mexico to the southeast, the two U.S. states of Louisiana and Arkansas to the east and northeast, and U.S. unorganized territory encompassing parts of the current U.S. states of Oklahoma, Kansas, Colorado, and Wyoming to the north. The Texas Revolution began when hostilities broke out on October 2, 1835, shortly before the regime of Mexican president and general Antonio López de Santa Anna adopted a new Mexican constitution known as the Siete Leyes that abolished the authority of the states under the federal republic and established a centralized government. The revolution lasted for over six months. On March 2, 1836, delegates in convention proclaimed the Texas Declaration of Independence. Major fighting ended on April 21, 1836, with the Treaties of Velasco that ended the fighting and secured Texas' independence.

The Mexican Congress refused to recognize the independence of the Republic of Texas, as the Treaties of Velasco were signed by Santa Anna under duress as prisoner, and the treaties were not approved by the Mexican Congress. Much of the territory claimed by the new republic was controlled and disputed by Mexico or the Comancheria; Mexico considered it a rebellious province during its entire existence. The Anglo-American residents of the area and of the republic were referred to as Texians, while Texans of Mexican descent were referred to as Tejanos.

Having gained independence following the revolution, Texas engaged in complex relations with various countries. European powers (France and the United Kingdom), along with the United States, hesitated to recognize the new republic, in deference to established relations with Mexico, but over time recognized Texas and adopted trade relations. Intermittent conflicts between Mexico and Texas continued into the 1840s.

Texas was annexed by the United States on December 29, 1845, and was admitted to the Union as the 28th state on that day, with the transfer of power from the Republic to the new state of Texas formally taking place on February 19, 1846. However, the United States inherited the southern and western border disputes with Mexico, which had refused to recognize Texas' sovereignty or to accept U.S. offers to purchase the territory. Consequently, the annexation led to the Mexican–American War.

== History ==
=== Spanish Texas ===
During the late Spanish colonial era, Texas had been one of the Provincias Internas, and the region is known in the historiography as Spanish Texas. Though claimed by Spain, it was not formally colonized by the empire until competing French interests at Fort St. Louis were a catalyst for Spain to establish permanent settlements in the area.

The region was long occupied and claimed by the existing indigenous groups of Native Americans. During the period from the 1690s–1710s, sporadic missionary expeditions took place before the Spanish established San Antonio as a permanent civilian settlement.

Following defeats by the British in North America and Europe, in 1762 Bourbon France ceded to Bourbon Spain most of its claims to the interior of North America, including its claim to Texas, as well as the vast interior west of the Mississippi River, which became Spanish Louisiana. During the years 1799 to 1803, the height of the Napoleonic Empire in France, Spain returned Louisiana to France.

Following the loss of numerous troops and failure to suppress the revolution by slaves and free people of color in Saint-Domingue, Napoleon decided to abandon North America; he sold what became known as the Louisiana Purchase to the United States. The status of Texas during these transfers was unclear and was not resolved until 1819, when the Adams–Onís Treaty between Spain and the United States ceded Spanish Florida to the United States, and established a clear boundary between Texas and Louisiana.

Starting in 1810 with the outbreak of the Mexican War of Independence, New Spain sought a different relationship with the Spanish crown. Some Anglo Americans fought on the side of Mexico against Spain in filibustering expeditions. One of these, the Gutiérrez–Magee Expedition (also known as the Republican Army of the North), consisted of a group of about 130 Anglo Americans under the leadership of Bernardo Gutiérrez de Lara. Gutiérrez de Lara initiated Mexico's secession from Spain with efforts contributed by Augustus Magee. Bolstered by new recruits, and led by Samuel Kemper (who succeeded Magee after his death in battle in 1813), the expedition gained a series of victories against soldiers led by the Spanish governor, Manuel María de Salcedo.

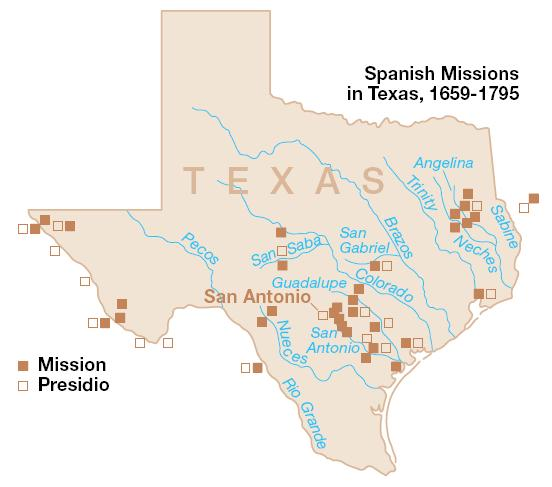
Spanish missions in Texas

Their victory at the Battle of Rosillo Creek convinced Salcedo to surrender on April 1, 1813; he was executed two days later. On April 6, 1813, the victorious Republican Army of the North drafted a constitution and declared the independent Republic of Texas, with Gutiérrez as its president. Soon disillusioned with the Mexican leadership, the Anglo Americans under Kemper returned to the United States.

The ephemeral Republic of Texas came to an end on August 18, 1813, with the Battle of Medina, where the Spanish Army crushed the Republican Army of the North. The harsh reprisals against the Texas rebels created a deep distrust of the Royal Spanish authorities. Veterans of the Battle of Medina became leaders of the Texas Revolution and signatories of the Texas Declaration of Independence from Mexico 20 years later.

After the failure of the expedition, there was no serious push for a "Republic of Texas" for another six years, until 1819. That year Virginian filibuster James Long invaded Spanish Texas in an attempt to liberate the region. The Americans were eager to gain territory where they could extend slavery for agricultural and other development.

=== Mexican Texas ===
The establishment of Mexican Texas in 1821 coincided with the Austin-led colonization, leading to animosity between Mexican authorities and the acceleration of American immigration to Texas. The First Mexican Empire was short-lived, being replaced by a republican form of government in 1823. In 1824, the sparsely populated territories of Texas and Coahuila were joined to form the state of Coahuila y Tejas. The capital was controversially located in southern Coahuila, the part farthest from Texas.

Mexico's independence from Spain in 1821 had Texas become part of the newly formed Mexican state. During this period, Stephen F. Austin led a group of American settlers, known as the Old Three Hundred, who were granted permission to establish colonies in Texas. However, tensions between the Mexican government and these American settlers grew, fueled by cultural differences, economic disparities, and the issue of slavery. The Mexican government's attempts to restrict American immigration and enforce its laws led to increased resentment among the settlers, culminating in the Texas Revolution.

Following Austin's lead, additional groups of immigrants, known as Empresarios, continued to colonize Mexican Texas from the United States. A spike in the price of cotton, and the success of plantations in Mississippi, encouraged large numbers of white Americans to migrate to Texas and obtain slaves to try to replicate the plantation business model. In the Law of April 6, 1830, Mexican President Anastasio Bustamante outlawed American immigration to Texas, following several conflicts with the Empresarios over the status of slavery, which had been abolished in Mexico in 1829, but which the Texians refused to end. Texians replaced slavery with long-term indentured servitude contracts signed by "liberated" slaves in the United States to work around the abolition of slavery. Angered at the interference of the Mexican government, the Empresarios held the Convention of 1832, which was the first formal step in what became the Texas Revolution.

=== Texas Revolution ===
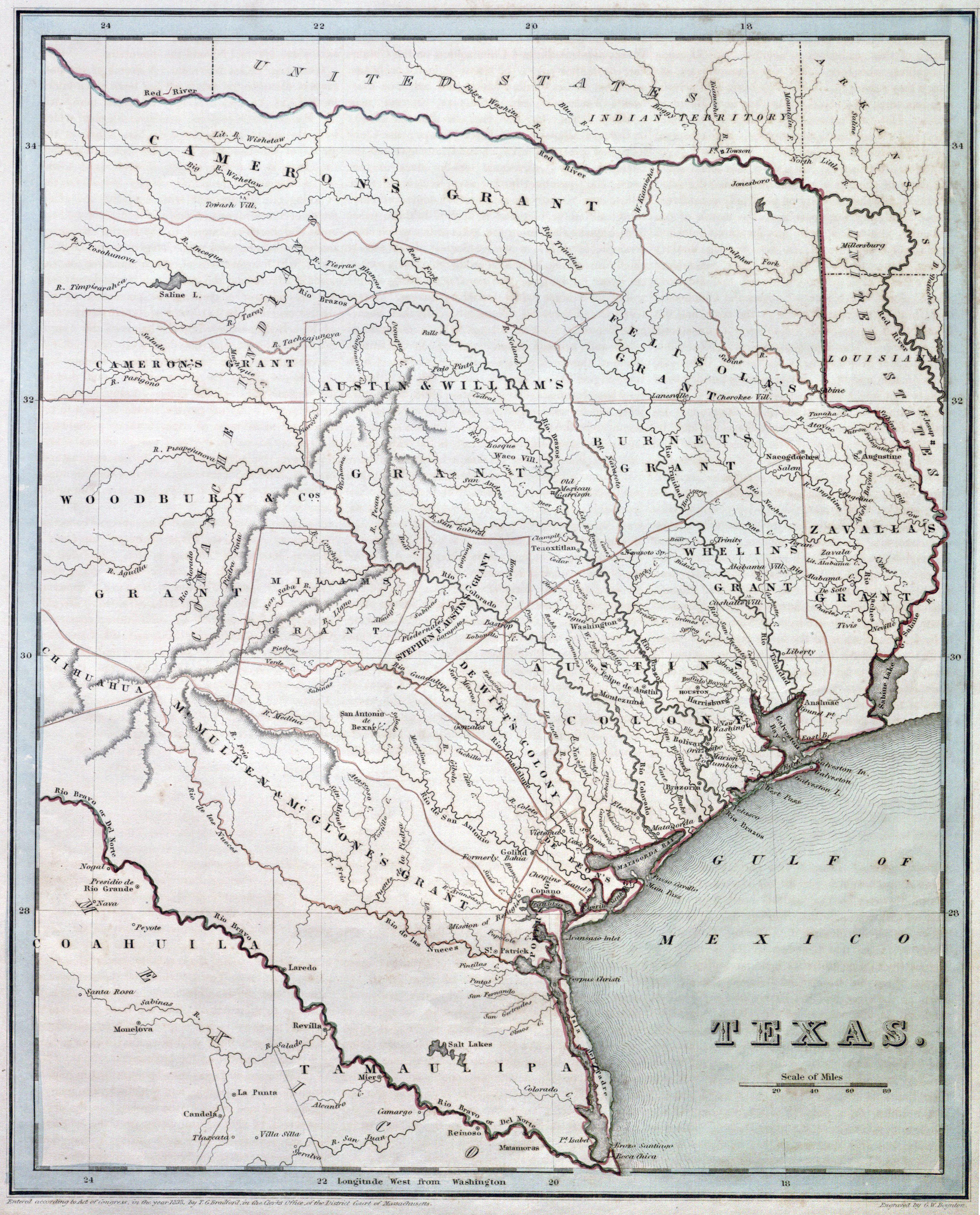
Map of the Republic of Texas by Thomas Gamaliel Bradford, 1838

By 1834, American immigrants in the area greatly outnumbered Mexicans. Following a series of minor skirmishes between Mexican authorities and the immigrants, the Mexican government increased its military presence in Texas throughout 1834 and early 1835. Mexico created a new constitution formalized under President Antonio Santa Anna, called Siete Leyes, and began to strengthen the central government. American immigrants described it as restoring pre-enlightened forms of governance, depriving them of their rights and liberties. They objected to mandatory Catholicism and, when Santa Anna began enforcing anti-slavery laws, many feared religious coercion could be next.

In 1835, the central government split Coahuila y Tejas into two separate departments. The Texian leadership under Austin began to organize its own military, and hostilities broke out on October 2, 1835, at the Battle of Gonzales, the first engagement of the Texas Revolution. In November 1835, a provisional government known as the Consultation was established to oppose the Santa Anna regime (but stopped short of declaring independence from Mexico). On March 1, 1836, the Convention of 1836 came to order, and the next day declared independence from Mexico, establishing the Republic of Texas. The influences of English, Mexican, and American revolutionary traditions were embedded into the Texas Declaration of Independence.

=== Independent republic ===
==== Politics ====
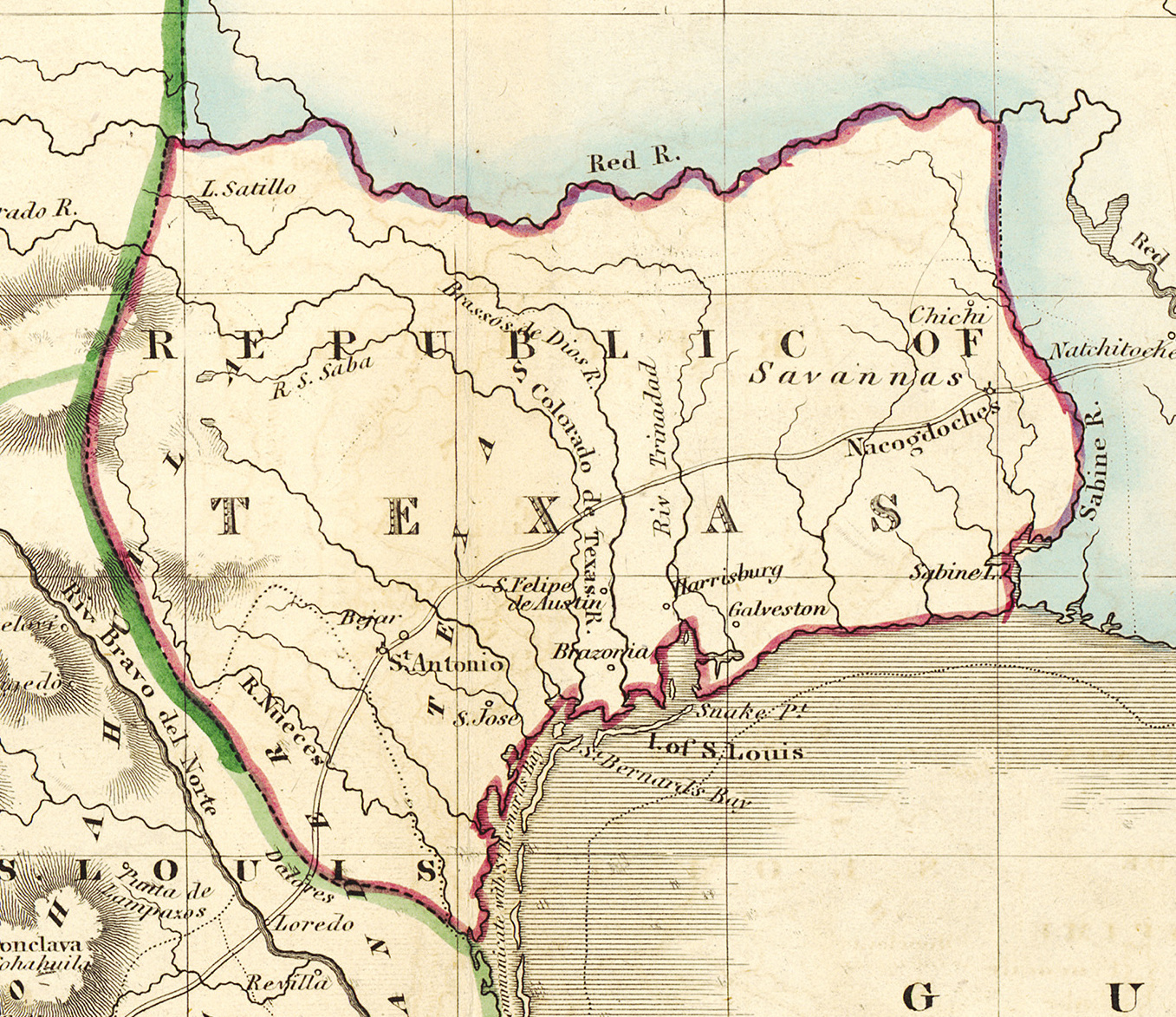
Detail of a map showing the Republic of Texas by William Home Lizars, 1836

In March 1836, David G. Burnet became the interim president of Texas, and appointed Lorenzo de Zavala as vice president at the same time, following a vote where Burnet won among convention delegates. Burnet declined to run for reelection, thereafter Sam Houston was elected as the new President of the Republic of Texas on September 5, 1836, with Burnet resigning. The second Congress of the Republic of Texas convened a month later, in October 1836, at Columbia (now West Columbia). Stephen F. Austin, known as the Father of Texas, died December 27, 1836, after serving two months as Secretary of State for the new Republic.

In 1836, five sites served as temporary capitals of Texas (Washington-on-the-Brazos, Harrisburg, Galveston, Velasco and Columbia), before President Sam Houston moved the capital to Houston in 1837. The next president, Mirabeau B. Lamar, moved the capital to the new town of Austin in 1839.

The first flag of the republic was the "Burnet Flag" (a single gold star on an azure field), followed in 1839 by official adoption of the Lone Star Flag.

Internal politics of the Republic were focused on two factions. The nationalist faction, led by Lamar, advocated the continued independence of Texas, the expulsion of the Native Americans, and the expansion of Texas to the Pacific Ocean. Their opponents, led by Houston, advocated the annexation of Texas to the United States and peaceful coexistence with the Native Americans where possible. The Congress of the Republic of Texas even passed a resolution over Houston's veto, claiming The Californias for Texas. The 1844 Republic of Texas presidential election split the electorate dramatically, with the newer western regions of the Republic preferring the nationalist candidate Edward Burleson, while the cotton country, particularly east of the Trinity River, went for Anson Jones.

==== Armed conflicts ====
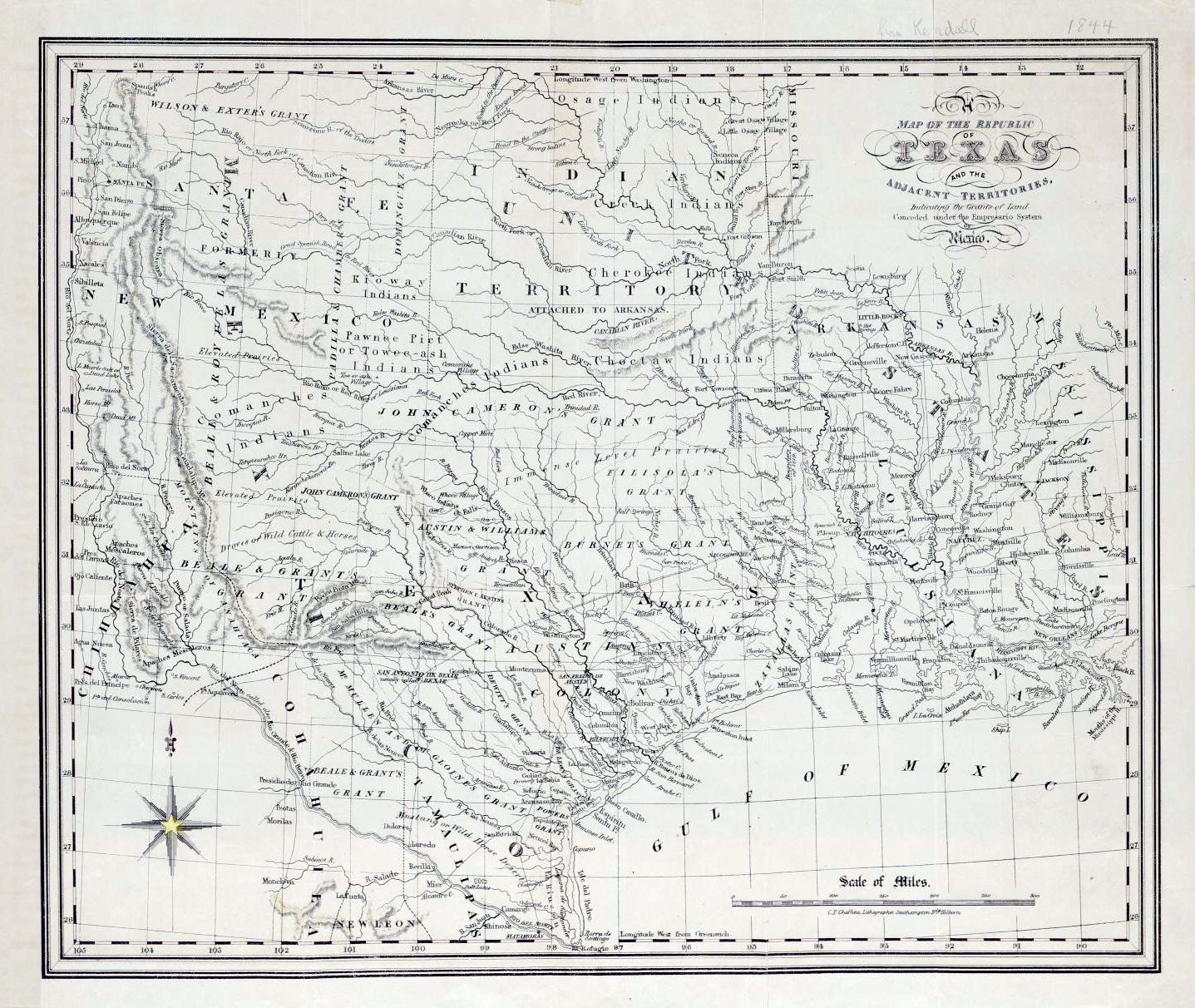
Map of the Republic of Texas and the Adjacent Territories by C.F. Cheffins, 1841

The Comanche Indians, whose territory included northwest Texas, furnished the main tribal opposition to the Republic, manifested in multiple raids on Mexican, indigenous, and European settlements. In the late 1830s, Sam Houston negotiated peace between Texas and the Comanches. When Lamar ascended to presidency in 1838 he reversed the Houston administration's policy towards the Native Americans. War soon resumed with the Comanches and Lamar ordered an invasion of Comancheria itself. In retaliation, the Comanches attacked Texas in a series of raids. After peace talks in 1840 ended with the massacre of 34 Comanche leaders in San Antonio, the Comanches launched a major attack deep into Texas, known as the Great Raid of 1840. Under command of Potsanaquahip (Buffalo Hump), 500 to 700 Comanche cavalry warriors swept down the Guadalupe River valley, killing and plundering all the way to the shore of the Gulf of Mexico, where they sacked the towns of Victoria and Linnville. The Comanches retreated after being pursued by 186 rangers and were caught at the Battle of Plum Creek, in which they lost the plunder they had taken. Houston became president again in 1841 and, with both Texians and Comanches exhausted by war, a new peace was established.

The newly-founded Republic of Texas had ambitions to increase its territory, including the annexation of eastern New Mexico, and to control and plunder the trade along the Santa Fe Trail from the United States to New Mexico. In 1841, to those ends, President Lamar unofficially supported the Santa Fe Expedition. Texas merchants accompanied by 320 soldiers invaded New Mexico. The expedition failed; the participants were captured and imprisoned, although eventually released to return to Texas. In 1843, Texans, with the support of their government, conducted two large raids on New Mexico and commercial traffic on the Santa Fe Trail. Both raids failed. The raiders killed several Mexican citizens and soldiers, but were defeated by New Mexican ciboleros to end the first raid and forced to surrender to the U.S. army on the second.

On its part, Mexico refused to recognize Texas's independence. On March 5, 1842, a Mexican force of over 500 men, led by Ráfael Vásquez, invaded Texas for the first time since the revolution. They soon headed back to the Rio Grande after briefly occupying San Antonio. About 1,400 Mexican troops, led by the French mercenary general Adrián Woll, launched a second attack and captured San Antonio on September 11, 1842. A Texas militia retaliated at the Battle of Salado Creek while simultaneously, a mile and a half away, Mexican soldiers massacred a militia of fifty-three Texas volunteers who had surrendered after a skirmish. That night, upon their defeat, the Mexican Army retreated from San Antonio, back to Mexico, while being pursued by Texas soldiers. The Texas Army took the city of Laredo, at which point they were given official orders from Sam Houston to return to San Antonio. Several soldiers ignored this order, and launched a failed battle to retake Ciudad Mier.

The Naval Battle of Campeche took place in two engagements on April 30, 1843, and May 16, 1843. The battle featured the most advanced warships of its day, including the Mexican steamer Guadalupe and the equally formidable Montezuma which engaged a squadron of vessels from the Republic of Yucatan and the Republic of Texas. The latter force consisted of the Texas Navy flagship sloop-of-war Austin, commanded by Commodore Edwin Ward Moore, the brig Wharton, and several schooners and five gunboats from the Republic of Yucatán, commanded by former Texas Navy Captain James D. Boylan. The battles were inconclusive. A scene from this battle is engraved on the cylinder of every Colt 1851 Navy, 1860 Army, and 1861 Navy revolver.

The Republic of Texas's relationship with Native American tribes was marked by persistent conflict. Tribes such as the Comanche and the Cherokee occupied much of the territory claimed by the Republic, leading to significant controversy. Although some treaties were signed to establish peace, the terms were frequently violated, resulting in ongoing violence. The Republic struggled to maintain a strong military presence to defend its borders against these tribes due to limited resources. To resolve these tensions, Tehuacana Creek Councils, with the absence of the Comanches, led to a treaty. The negotiated treaty is known as the Treaty of Tehuacana Creek, which was signed in 1844. The agreement led to the effective dismantilation of the Tehuacana Creek Council, which included tribes such as, the Cherokees, Wacos, Caddos, Anadarkos, Hainas, Delawares, Shawnees, Tawakonis,Lipan Apaches, and southern Comanches.

Chief Tosahwi of the Penateka Comanche

The Treaty of Tehuacana Creek, while significant in its attempt to establish lasting peace, faced considerable challenges in implementation. The diverse tribal groups involved held varying levels of commitment to the agreement, and the Republic of Texas lacked the resources and manpower to consistently enforce its terms. Furthermore, ongoing disputes over land and resources, coupled with the continued encroachment of settlers, fueled tensions and undermined the treaty's effectiveness. The fragile peace established by the treaty ultimately proved short-lived, as conflicts between the Republic and various Native American tribes persisted throughout the remainder of the Republic's existence.

Conflicts between Texas and Mexico intensified conflicts between political factions, including an incident known as the Texas Archive War. To "protect" the Texas national archives, President Sam Houston ordered them removed from Austin. The archives were eventually returned to Austin, albeit at gunpoint. The Texas Congress admonished Houston for the incident, and this episode in Texas history solidified Austin as Texas's seat of government for the Republic and the future state.

There were also domestic disturbances. The Regulator–Moderator War involved a land feud in Harrison and Shelby Counties in East Texas from 1839 to 1844. The feud eventually involved Nacogdoches, San Augustine, and other East Texas counties. Harrison County Sheriff John J. Kennedy and county judge Joseph U. Fields helped end the conflict, siding with the law-and-order party. Sam Houston ordered 500 militia to help end the feud.

== Borders ==
Map of region, 1835–1846 Territory which declared its independence from Mexico, 1835–1846 Territory claimed by the Republic of Texas Territory claimed by the Republic of the Rio Grande Other rebellions

The Republic of Texas claimed borders based upon the Treaties of Velasco between the newly created Republic of Texas and General Antonio López de Santa Anna. The eastern boundary had been defined by the Adams–Onís Treaty of 1819 between the United States and the Spanish Empire, which recognized the Sabine River as the eastern boundary of Spanish Texas and western boundary of Louisiana and the Missouri Territory.

Under that treaty, the United States had renounced its claim to Spanish land to the east of the Rocky Mountains and to the north of the Rio Grande, which it claimed to have acquired as part of the Louisiana Purchase of 1803.

The Texian leaders at first intended to extend their national boundaries to the Pacific Ocean, but ultimately decided to claim the Rio Grande as boundary, including much of New Mexico, which the Republic never controlled. They also hoped, after peace was made with Mexico, to run a railroad to the Gulf of California to give "access to the East Indian, Peruvian and Chilean trade". When negotiating for the possibility of annexation to the U.S. in late 1836, the Texian government instructed its minister Wharton in Washington that if the boundary were an issue, Texas was willing to settle for a boundary at the watershed between the Nueces River and Rio Grande, and leave out New Mexico.

The southern and western boundary of the Republic of Texas with Mexico was disputed throughout the republic's existence, since Mexico refused to acknowledge the independence of Texas. Texas claimed the Rio Grande as its southern boundary, while Mexico insisted that the Nueces River was the boundary. In practice, much of the disputed territory was occupied by the Comanche people and outside the control of either state. Texian claims included the eastern portions of New Mexico, which was administered by Mexico throughout this period. Some contested regions (such as modern Texas southwest of the Pecos River) remained essentially self-governing while sending representatives to both the Mexican and Texian Congresses.

== Criteria of citizenship ==
Citizenship was not automatically granted to all previous inhabitants of Texas, and some residents were not allowed to continue living legally within the Republic without the consent of Congress. The Constitution of the Republic of Texas (1836) established different rights according to the race and ethnicity of each individual. Section 10 of the General Provisions of the Constitution stated that all persons who resided in Texas on the day of the Declaration of Independence were considered citizens of the Republic, excepting "Africans, the descendants of Africans, and Indians." For white immigrants, Section 6 established to become citizens, they needed to reside in Texas for at least six months and take an oath of loyalty to the Republic; in contrast, under Section 9, African slaves brought to Texas were to remain slaves and could not be emancipated without the consent of Congress. Furthermore, the Congress was not allowed to make laws banning or restricting either slavery or the slave trade. Section 9 also established that: "No free person of African descent, either in whole or in part, shall be permitted to reside permanently in the Republic, without the consent of Congress."

The Republic of Texas experienced significant immigration from both the United States and Europe. Settlers from the southern states brought their cultural and social norms, which included slavery. Slavery became a "cornerstone" of the Texian economy particularly in the agricultural sector. The institution of slavery had fueled the economy but also was able to reinforce social inequality. While slavery was officially abolished in Mexico in 1829, many Texians continued to practice it. This led to tensions with the Mexican government.

Women in the Republic of Texas, while often marginalized, still played crucial roles in society. They contributed to the economy through domestic labor, agriculture, and business. However, their legal rights were very limited and they faced significant social and economic obstacles.

== Government ==
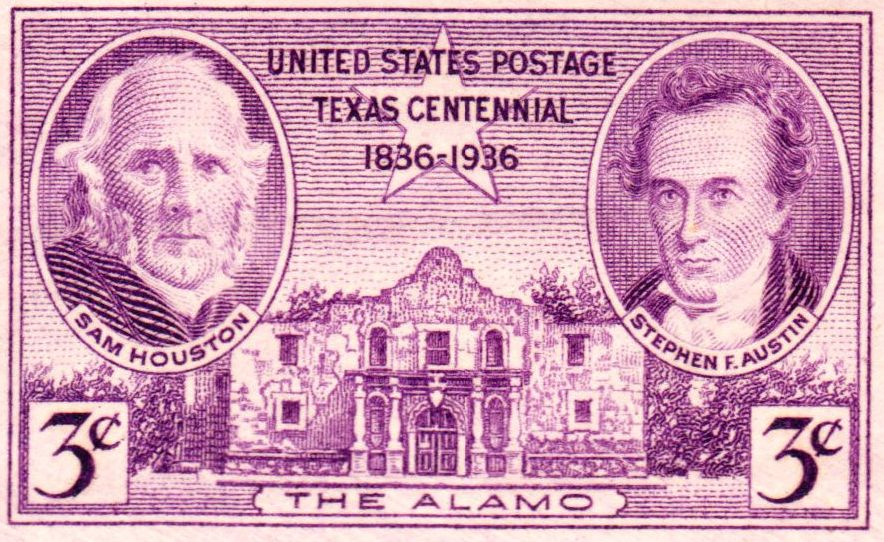
Sam Houston and Stephen F. Austin depicted on a 1936 US postage stamp commemorating 100th anniversary of the Texas Republic

In September 1836 Texas elected a Congress of 14 senators and 29 representatives. The Constitution allowed the first president to serve for two years and subsequent presidents for three years. To hold an office or vote, a man had to be a citizen of the Republic.

The first Congress of the Republic of Texas convened in October 1836 at Columbia (now West Columbia). Stephen F. Austin, often referred to as the "Father of Texas", died on December 27, 1836, after serving just two months as the republic's secretary of state. Due mainly to the ongoing war for independence, five sites served as temporary capitals of Texas in 1836: (Washington-on-the-Brazos, Harrisburg, Galveston, Velasco and Columbia). The capital was moved to the new city of Houston in 1837.

In 1839, a small pioneer settlement situated on the Colorado River in central Texas was chosen as the republic's seventh and final capital. Incorporated under the name Waterloo, the town was renamed Austin shortly thereafter in honor of Stephen F. Austin.

Unlike the constitution of the United States which provided for federalism, Texas had instead established a centralized unitary state.

The Republic of Texas established a robust legal system, including a Supreme Court to interpret and uphold the Constitution. The Constitution itself could be amended through a two-thirds vote in both houses of Congress, followed by ratification by the people. Major constitutional changes during this period often related to issues of land grants, taxation, and the powers of the executive and legislative branches. The court system inaugurated by Congress included a Supreme Court consisting of a chief justice appointed by the president and four associate justices, elected by a joint ballot of both houses of Congress for four-year terms and eligible for re-election. The associates also presided over four judicial districts. Houston nominated James Collinsworth to be the first chief justice. The county-court system consisted of a chief justice and two associates, chosen by a majority of the justices of the peace in the county. Each county was also to have a sheriff, a coroner, justices of the peace, and constables to serve two-year terms. Congress formed 23 counties, whose boundaries generally coincided with the existing municipalities. In 1839, Texas became the first nation in the world to enact a homestead exemption, under which creditors cannot seize a person's primary residence.

The Republic's political landscape was marked by factionalism with two primary groups emerging, the War Party and the Peace Party. The War Party, led by figures like Mirabeau B. Lamar, advocated for a more aggressive stance against Native American tribes and Mexico, expansion, and military action. The Peace Party, associated with Sam Houston, prioritized diplomacy, compromise, and a more cautious approach to foreign policy. These factions often clashed over key issues shaping the Republic's domestic and foreign affairs.

== Education ==
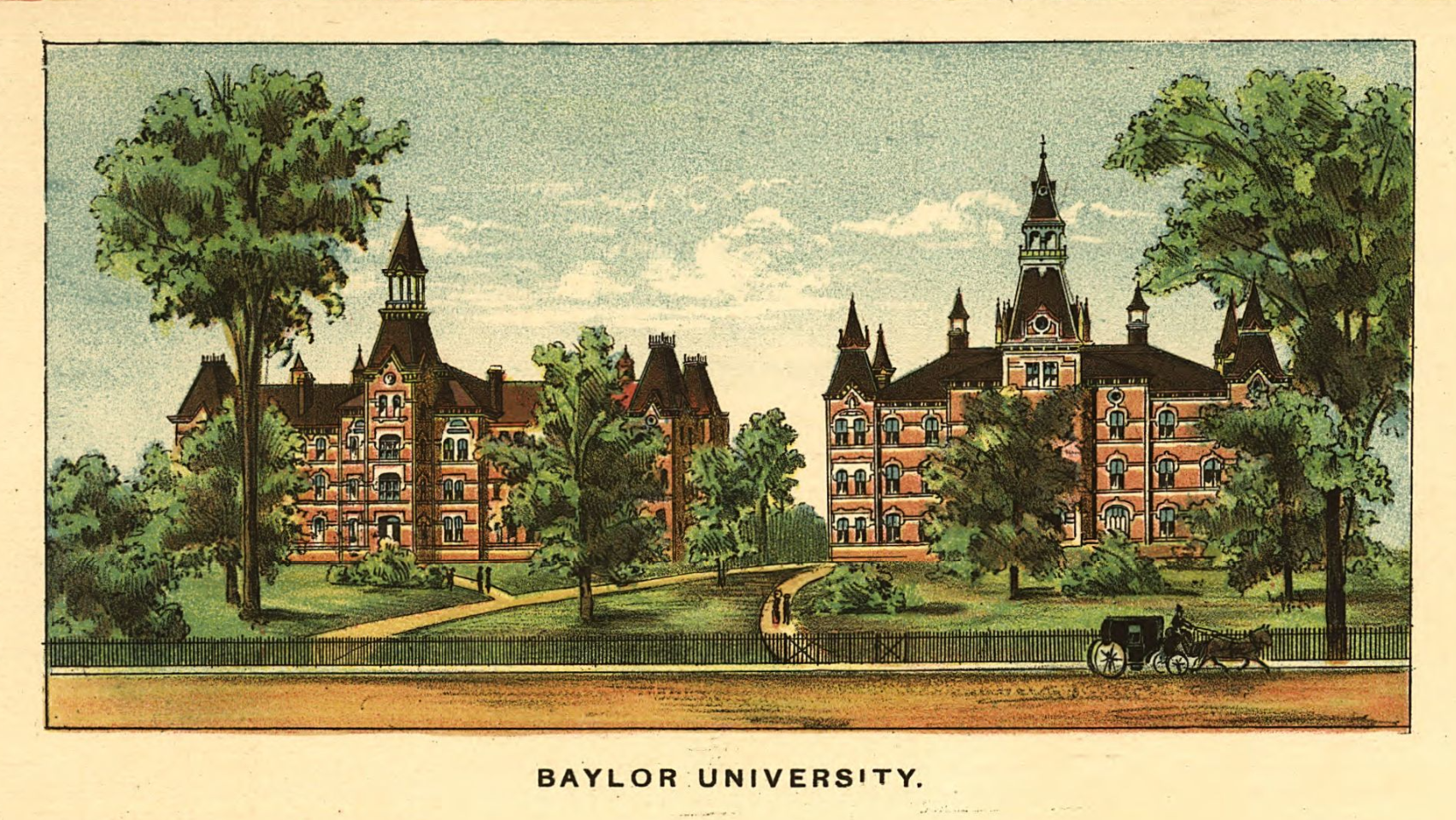
Baylor University, 1892 lithograph

President Anson Jones signed the charter for Baylor University in the fall of 1845. Henry Lee Graves was elected Baylor's first president. It is believed to be the oldest university in Texas; however, Rutersville College was chartered in 1840 with land and the town of Rutersville. Chauncey Richardson was elected Rutersville first president. The college later became Southwestern University in Georgetown, Williamson county. University of Mary Hardin-Baylor was also chartered by the Republic of Texas in 1845, and received lands in Belton, Texas. Wesleyan College, chartered in 1844 and signed by president Sam Houston, another predecessor to Southwestern did not survive long due to competition from other colleges. Mirabeau Lamar signed a charter in 1844 for the Herman University for medicine but classes never started due to lack of funds. The University of San Augustine was chartered June 5, 1837, but did not open until 1842 when Marcus A. Montrose became president. There were as many as 150 students enrolled. However, attendance declined to 50 in 1845, and further situations including animosity and embittered factions in the community closed the university in 1847. Later it became the University of East Texas, and soon after that became the Masonic Institute of San Augustine in 1851. Guadalupe College at Gonzales was approved January 30, 1841; however, no construction efforts ensued for the next eleven years.

== Diplomatic relations and foreign trade ==
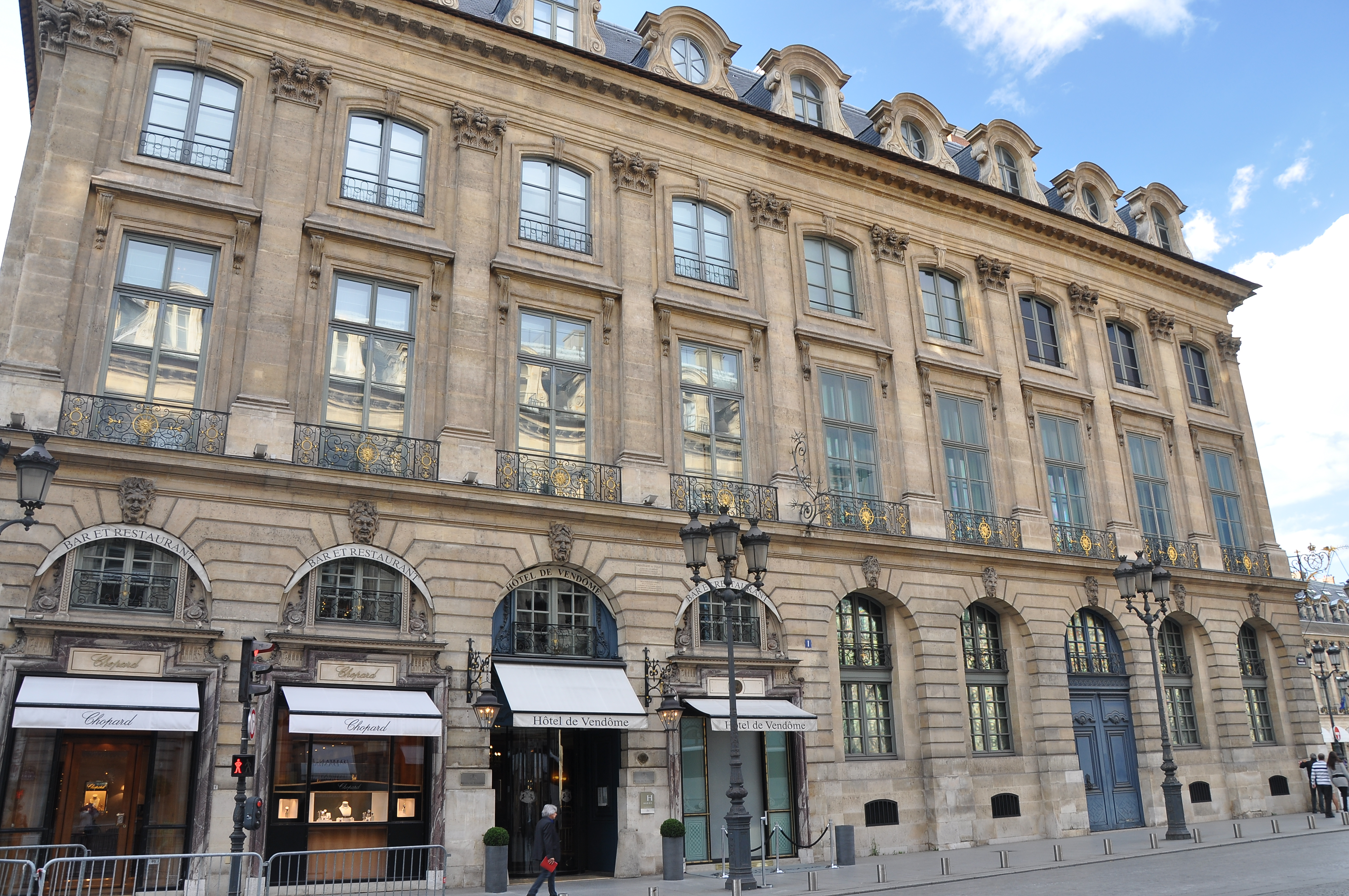
The Hôtel Bataille de Francès (now Hôtel de Vendôme), Place Vendôme in Paris, housed the Embassy of the Republic of Texas.

During its existence, the Republic of Texas received diplomatic recognition from only seven nations: Belgium, France, the Netherlands, Denmark, the Republic of Yucatán, the United Kingdom, and the United States of America. Texas' status as a slaveholding country and Mexico's claim on the territory caused significant problems in the foreign relations of Texas with other nations.

Despite this, these nations adopted trade relations with Texas, and in turn, provided for friendly relations with them. Its main exports were predominantly crops, such as cotton and corn. Raw materials like iron, as well as machinery and other consumer goods like tea, beer, and chocolate were traded as well. Outside of these countries, Texas did export some goods to Denmark, and in some instances, to Russia and Spain, though amounts were minimal.

Although it was supported by the vast majority of Texians at the time of independence, annexation by the United States was prevented by the leadership of both major U.S. political parties, the Democrats and the Whigs, who opposed the introduction of a vast slave-holding region into a country already divided into pro- and anti-slavery sections and wished to avoid a war with Mexico.

On March 3, 1837, U.S. President Andrew Jackson appointed Alcée La Branche as chargé d'affaires to the Republic of Texas, thus officially recognizing Texas as an independent republic. France granted official recognition of Texas on September 25, 1839, appointing Alphonse Dubois de Saligny to serve as chargé d'affaires. The French Legation was built in 1841, and still stands in Austin as the oldest frame structure in the city. Conversely, the Republic of Texas embassy in Paris was located in what is now the Hôtel de Vendôme, adjacent to the Place Vendôme in the 1st arrondissement of Paris. The Kingdom of Denmark gave recognition to Texas in turn for free trade. Although no embassy was established, Texas had created a legation in Austin.

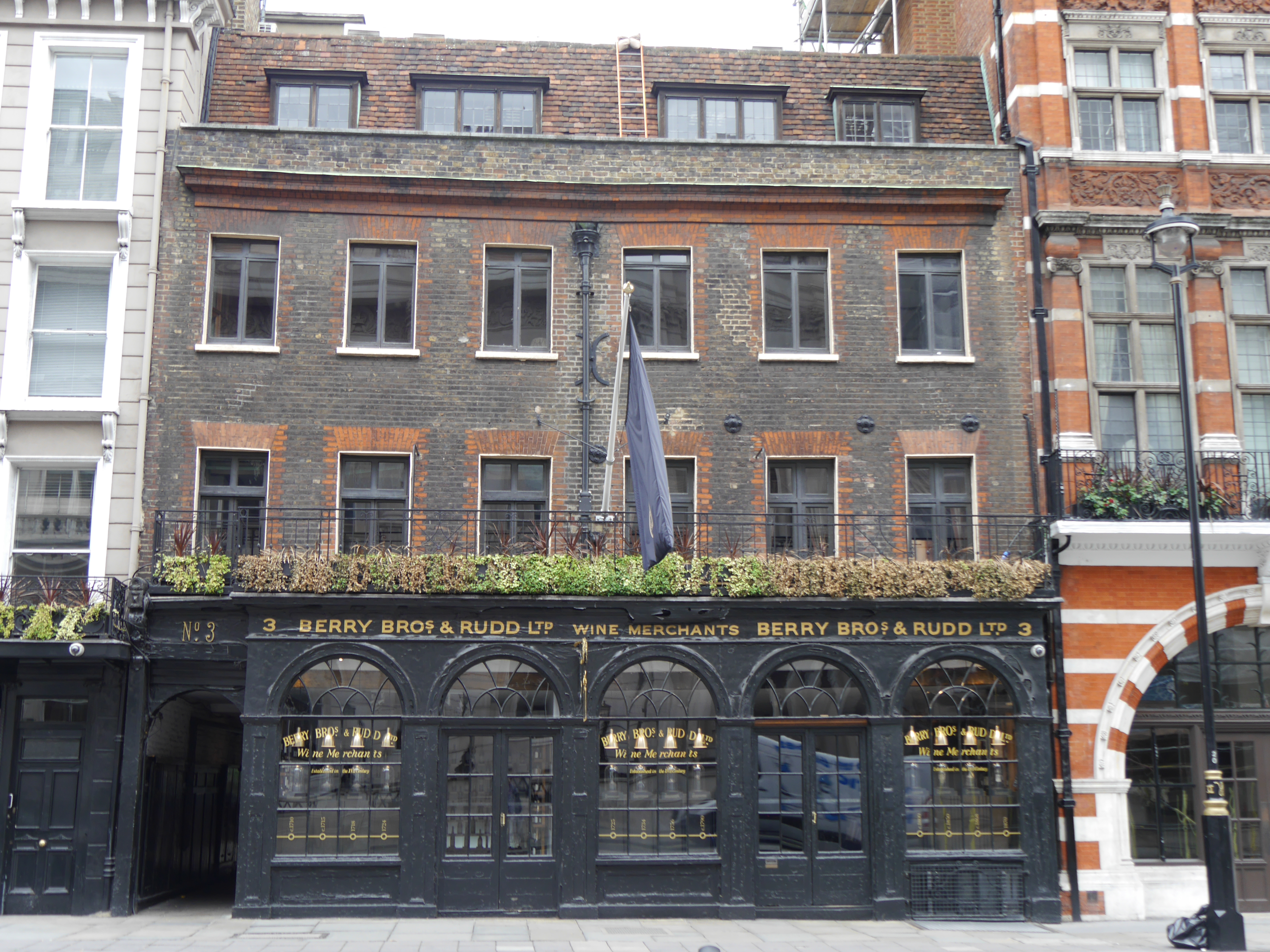
Building housing the Texas Legation from 1842-1845, London

The United Kingdom hesitated to grant official recognition to the Republic of Texas due to its own friendly relations with Mexico, but nevertheless admitted Texian goods into British ports. In London, opposite the gates to St. James's Palace, the original Embassy of the Republic of Texas is now a hat shop but is clearly marked with a large plaque and there was a nearby restaurant in Trafalgar Square called the Texas Embassy Cantina, which closed in June 2012. A plaque on the exterior of 3 St. James's Street in London notes that the upper floors of the building housed the Texas Legation.

The United Kingdom eventually recognized Texas in the 1840s after a cotton price crash, in a failed attempt to coerce Texas to give up slavery (replacing slave-produced cotton from southern U.S. states) and to stop expansion of the United States to the southwest. The cotton price crash of the 1840s bankrupted the Republic, increasing the urgency of finding foreign allies who could help prevent a reconquest by Mexico.

The Republic of Texas faced significant economic challenges, including the establishment of a stable financial system.While some banks were established, the lack of a centralized banking system and the volatility of the Texas dollar made financial transactions difficult. Private banking played a crucial role, but it was often unregulated and subject to fluctuations in the market.

== Presidents and vice presidents ==
Presidents and vice presidents of the Republic of Texas
No.	Portrait	President	Term of office	Party	Term	Previous office	Vice President
—		David G. Burnet; April 18, 1788 – December 5, 1870 (aged 82)	March 16, 1836 – October 22, 1836	Nonpartisan	Interim	Delegate to the Convention of 1833	Lorenzo de Zavala
1		Sam Houston; March 2, 1793 – July 26, 1863 (aged 70)	October 22, 1836 – December 10, 1838	Nonpartisan	1 (1836)	Commander-in-Chief of the Texian Army (1836)	Mirabeau B. Lamar
2		Mirabeau Lamar; August 16, 1798 – December 19, 1859 (aged 61)	December 10, 1838 – December 13, 1841	Nonpartisan	2 (1838)	1st Vice President of the Republic of Texas (1836–1838)	David G. Burnet
3		Sam Houston; March 2, 1793 – July 26, 1863 (aged 70)	December 13, 1841 – December 9, 1844	Nonpartisan	3 (1841)	1st President of the Republic of Texas (1836–1838)	Edward Burleson
4		Anson Jones; January 20, 1798 – January 9, 1858 (aged 59)	December 9, 1844 – February 19, 1846	Nonpartisan	4 (1844)	11th Secretary of State of the Republic of Texas (1841–1844)	Kenneth Anderson; December 9, 1844 – July 3, 1845

== Annexation by the U.S. ==
On February 28, 1845, the U.S. Congress passed a bill that authorized the United States to annex the Republic of Texas. On March 1, U.S. President John Tyler signed the bill. The legislation set the date for annexation for December 29 of the same year. Faced with imminent American annexation of Texas, Charles Elliot and Alphonse de Saligny, the British and French ministers to Texas, were dispatched to Mexico City by their governments. Meeting with Mexico's foreign secretary, they signed a "Diplomatic Act" in which Mexico offered to recognize an independent Texas with boundaries determined with French and British mediation. Texas President Anson Jones forwarded both offers to a specially elected convention meeting at Austin, and the American proposal was accepted with only one dissenting vote. The Mexican proposal was never put to a vote. Following the previous decree of President Jones, the proposal was then put to a vote throughout the republic.

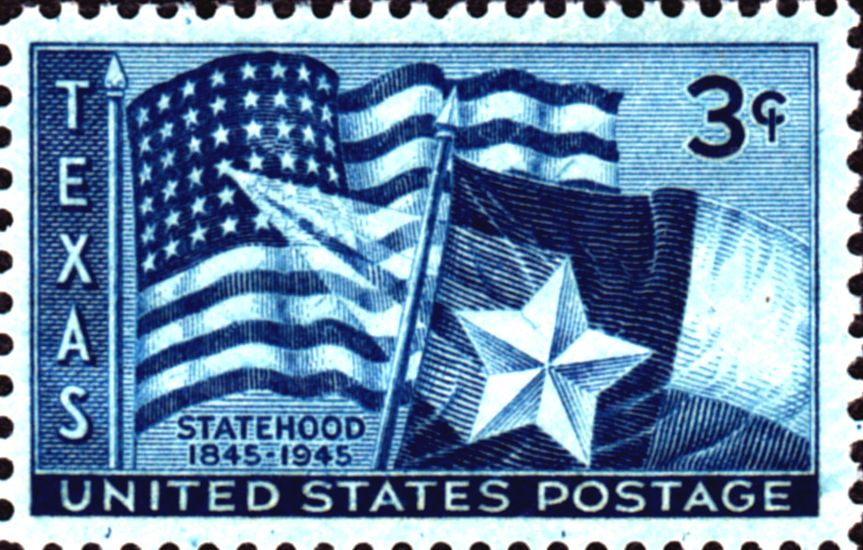
Postage stamp issued on the 100th anniversary of Texas statehood, 1945

Proposals for Texas's north and west boundaries in 1850 debate

On October 13, 1845, a large majority of voters in the republic approved both the American offer and the proposed constitution that specifically endorsed slavery and immigrants bringing slaves to Texas. This constitution was later accepted by the U.S. Congress, making Texas a U.S. state on the same day annexation took effect, December 29, 1845 (therefore bypassing a territorial phase). One of the motivations for annexation was the huge debts which the Republic of Texas government had incurred. As part of the Compromise of 1850, in return for $10,000,000 in Federal bonds, Texas dropped claims to territory that included parts of present-day Colorado, Kansas, Oklahoma, New Mexico, and Wyoming.

The resolution included two unique provisions: First, it said up to four additional states could be created from Texas' territory with the consent of the State of Texas and pursuant to the admissions process of the federal constitution. New states north of the Missouri Compromise Line would be free states, while those south of the line could opt to become slave states. Though the resolution did not make exceptions to the constitution, the U.S. Constitution does not require Congressional consent to the creation of new states to be ex post to applications, nor does the U.S. Constitution require applications to expire. Second, Texas did not have to surrender its public lands to the federal government. While Texas did cede all territory outside of its current area to the federal government in 1850, it did not cede any public lands within its current boundaries. Consequently, the lands in Texas that the federal government owns are those it subsequently purchased. This also means the state government controls oil reserves, which it later used to fund the state's public university system through the Permanent University Fund. In addition, the state's control over offshore oil reserves in Texas runs out to 3 nautical leagues (9 nautical miles, 10.357 statute miles, 16.668 km) rather than three nautical miles (3.45 statute miles, 5.56 km) as with other states.

== See also ==
- Vermont Republic
- Indian Territory
- Kingdom of Hawaii / Republic of Hawaii
- Timeline of the Republic of Texas
- The Texas Legation
- History of slavery in Texas
- Republic of Texas (group), late 20th century

== Citations ==
- Huson, Hobart (1974), Captain Phillip Dimmitt's Commandancy of Goliad, 1835–1836: An Episode of the Mexican Federalist War in Texas, Usually Referred to as the Texan Revolution, Austin, TX: Von Boeckmann-Jones Co
- Hämäläinen, Pekka (2008), The Comanche Empire, Yale University Press, ISBN 978-0-300-12654-9
- Lack, Paul D. (1992), The Texas Revolutionary Experience: A Political and Social History 1835–1836, Texas A&M University Press, ISBN 0-89096-497-1
- Fehrenbach, T. R. (2000), Lone Star: a history of Texas and the Texans, Da Capo Press, ISBN 978-0-306-80942-2
- Republic of Texas Historical Resources
- Republic of Texas from the Handbook of Texas Online
- Hosted by Portal to Texas History:
  - Texas: the Rise, Progress, and Prospects of the Republic of Texas, Vol. 1, by William Kennedy, published 1841
  - Texas: the Rise, Progress, and Prospects of the Republic of Texas, Vol. 2, published 1841
  - Laws of the Republic, 1836–1838 from Gammel's Laws of Texas, Vol. I.
  - Laws of the Republic, 1838–1845 from Gammel's Laws of Texas, Vol. II.
- The Avalon Project at Yale Law School: Texas – From Independence to Annexation
- Early Settlers and Indian Fighters of Southwest Texas by Andrew Jackson Sowell 1900
