= Surfside Vykruta Jetty Trail =

Man-made jetty in Surfside Beach, Texas, U.S.

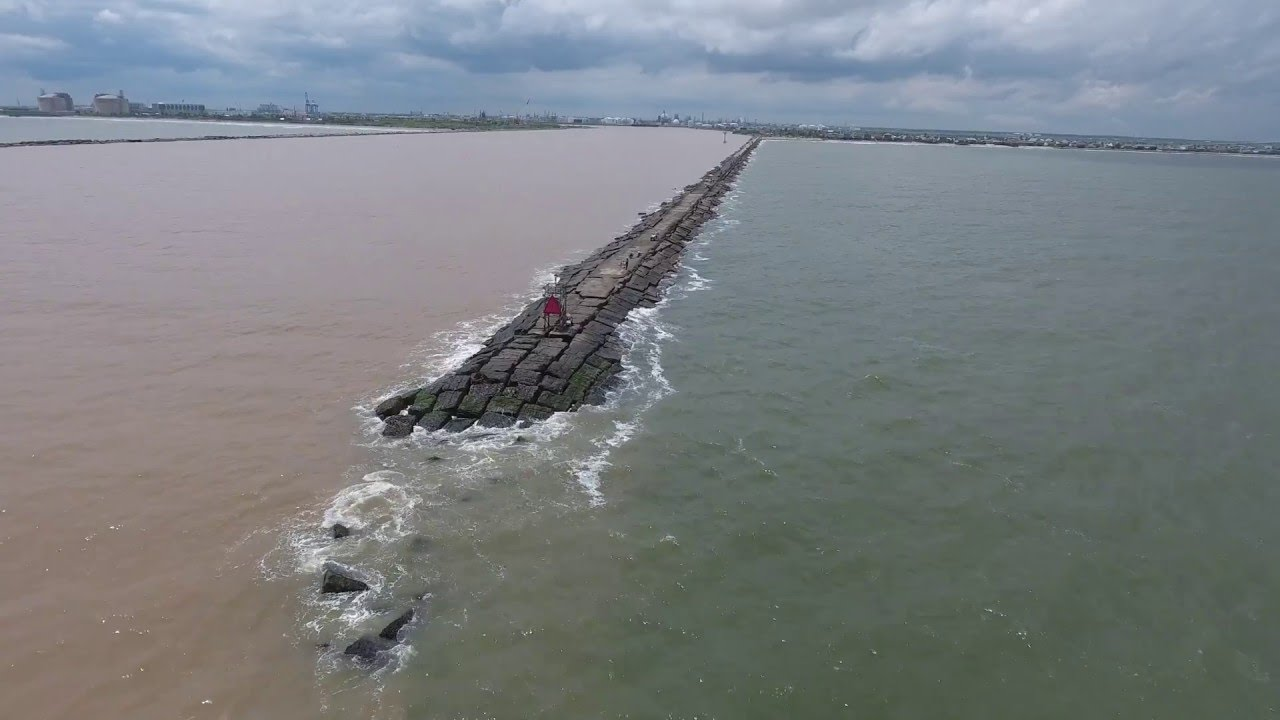
Vykruta Surfside Jetty Trail outer most section, nearly 1 mile out to sea. Zoom in to see small light house.

The Surfside Vykruta Jetty Trail is a 4300' long man-made jetty constructed primarily of large granite slabs located in the southeast tip of Surfside Beach, Texas. The jetty extends 3464' into the Gulf of Mexico and protects the Freeport Harbor Channel. The trailhead is accessible from the Surfside Jetty County Park, a 15-acre day use beach park.

== Walkway and lighthouse ==
The jetty is covered with a concrete walkway for easy access by foot. The jetty is earmarked with a small lighthouse at the outermost section.

== Recreational activities ==
=== Fishing ===
The jetty frequented by fishermen, during daytime and night when assisted with large, gas generator powered flood lights to attract fish. Dozens of fisherman gather daily to catch red drum, speckled trout, spanish mackerel and other species. The Surfside area is a popular spot for fishing hobbyists and competitive anglers because there are several marinas visitors can utilize, like CCA STAR Tournament official weigh-in station Surfside Marina, for their fishing and boating needs.

=== Surfing ===
Surfing is popular just north of the jetty; surfers travel hours for the excellent surfing.

=== Photography, drone photography, bird watching ===
The Vykruta Jetty Trail is popular for photography and drone photography and seabird watching.
