= Surfside Beach =

Surfside Beach may refer to the following places in the United States:

- Surfside Beach, South Carolina
- Surfside Beach, Texas
- Surfside Beach (Surfside, Florida), a beach and adjacent neighborhood
