= Velasco, Texas =

Ghost town in Texas, United States

- Ghost Town
- Nicknames: Republic of Texas Capital; Town of Old Velasco
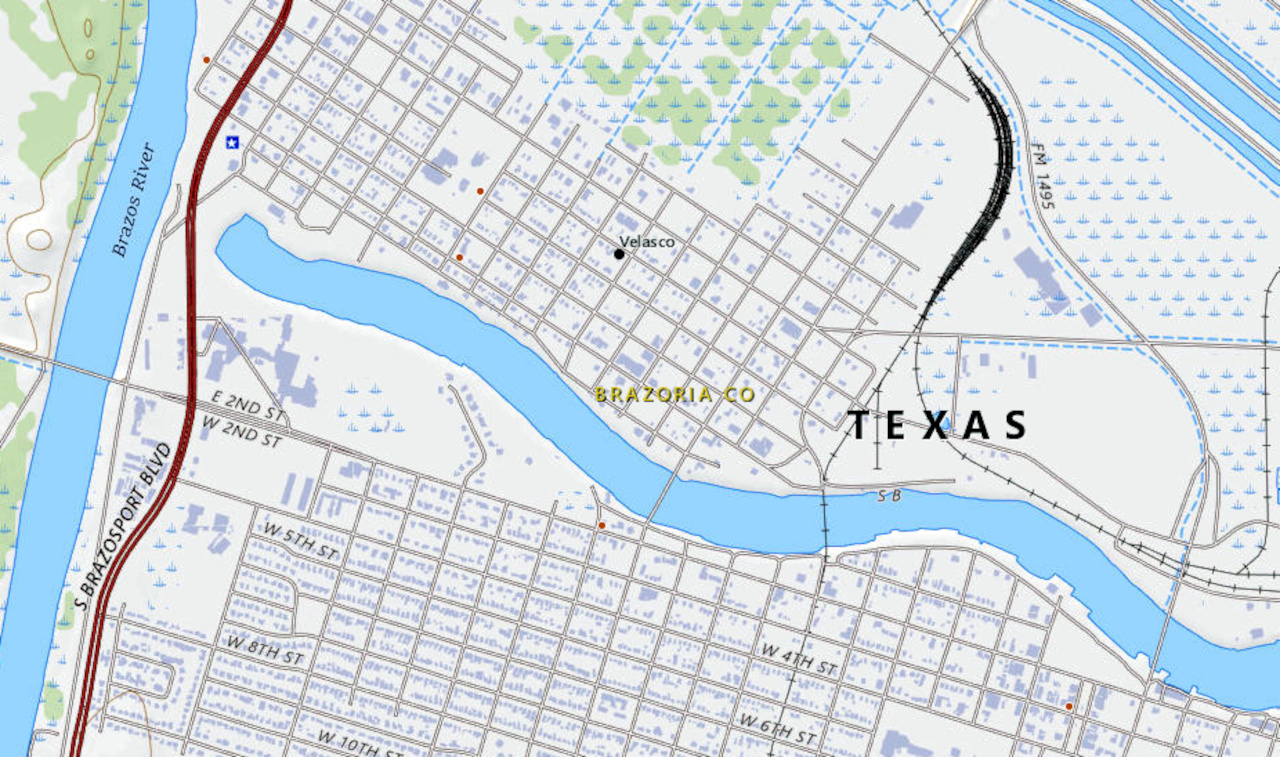
- Velasco in Brazoria County, Texas

- Location within Texas Location within the United States
- Coordinates: 28.96191°N 95.3605°W
- Country: United States
- U.S. State: Texas
- County: Brazoria County
- Incorporated Town: Freeport
- Founded in Mexican Texas: 1821
- Founder: Old Three Hundred
- Time zone: UTC-6 (Central (CST))
  - Summer (DST): UTC-5 (CDT)
- ZIP code: 77541
- North American Numbering Plan: 979
- GNIS feature ID: 1381075
- Website: Fort Velasco

Velasco was a town in Texas, United States, that was later merged with the city of Freeport by an election conducted by eligible voters of both municipalities on February 9, 1957. The consolidation effort passed by a margin of 17 votes. Founded in 1831, Velasco is situated on the east side of the Brazos River in southeastern Texas. It is 16 miles (26 km) south of Angleton, and 4 miles (6.4 km) from the Gulf of Mexico.

The town's early history is closely tied with the Battle of Velasco and the Texas Revolution. Velasco was an important entry point for American settlers in Texas. In 1836, following the decisive Battle of San Jacinto, Velasco was named a temporary capital of the Republic of Texas by the interim President, David G. Burnet. In 1837, the final actions of the Battle of the Brazos River took place there.

== History ==
Velasco was originally located on the Gulf Coast on the east side of the mouth of the Brazos River where Fort Velasco and present-day Surfside is located on the Texas Gulf Coast. In 1821, the schooner Lively landed at the site with 38 men, the first of Stephen F. Austin's colonists. At the time, Texas was part of Mexico, but Austin had obtained permission to bring American settlers into the area, with the first colonists settling in what is now southern Brazoria County.

Velasco consisted of a single house until 1831 when Mexico set up a customs port there and dispatched troops to help the customs collector. More than 25,000 settlers entered through the port. The town was named for a Mexican general, as was Quintana, on the opposite side of the river.

Velasco was the site of the Battle of Velasco in 1832. The battle was fought on June 26, 1832, between Texas colonists and Mexico four years before the Texas Revolution. The Mexican commander during the conflict, Domingo de Ugartechea, tried to stop the Texans from transporting a cannon up the Brazos River to attack the city of Anahuac. The Texans were led by Brazoria Alcalde, John Austin, and schoolteacher and farmer Henry Smith. The Texan militia eventually prevailed over the greatly outnumbered Mexicans. Ugartechea surrendered after a three-day battle, once he realized he would not be receiving reinforcements. His soldiers had also run out of ammunition.

In 1834, a cholera epidemic reduced the population to 100. After the Battle of San Jacinto, President David G. Burnet made the town the temporary capital of the Republic of Texas. Government records were housed at Fort Velasco until the first capital of Texas was established at Columbia. General Antonio López de Santa Anna signed the Treaties of Velasco on May 14, 1836, acknowledging Texas independence.

=== Antebellum period ===
Between the Texas Revolution and the American Civil War, Velasco and Quintana served as summer resorts for wealthy plantation families of the region. Galveston businessmen Samuel May Williams and Thomas F. McKinney established warehouses and organized shipping at the port. By 1838, a seminary for young ladies, Velasco Female Academy, and a school for young men, taught by Oxford graduates, were established. Comfortable hotels were built to accommodate visitors and patrons of the racetrack, which was located a short distance upriver. A local post office operated from 1846 until 1891 when mail was rerouted through Quintana. Antebellum Velasco had business houses, homes, a hotel, boardinghouses, wharves, and a customs house. Steamboats embarked from the wharves for Galveston and New Orleans. With the completion in 1856 of the first intracoastal canal to Galveston Bay, however, the town began to decline, as much of its shipping was diverted to Galveston.

=== U.S. Civil War ===
During the U.S. Civil War, the port of Velasco was fortified by Confederate troops and eight gun batteries, and Union ships were forced to go to New Orleans for drinking water, food, and fuel. The port played an active role in the exchange of cotton for European guns, ammunition, milled goods, and medicines for the army and home use. Federal vessels attempted to stop vital trade and fired upon shore defenses, patrols, and small craft seeking to outrun them.

=== Postbellum decline ===
With the ruin of the plantation system after the war, Velasco and Quintana declined as resorts. In 1875, a hurricane destroyed the old town records. By 1884, Old Velasco's residents numbered only 50.

=== New Velasco ===
The new town of Velasco was surveyed and laid out four miles upriver in 1891 when a new Velasco post office was established. The port was officially opened by the United States Secretary of the Treasury William Windom on July 7, 1891. Over $1,000,000 worth of lots were sold to Midwesterners looking for greener pastures and a seaside environment. By 1892, New Velasco had 136 business establishments and 167 residences, an electric light plant, and a planing mill. Jetties were built by the Brazos River Channel and Dock Company by 1897, and the newly dug deepwater port ran to a depth of 17½ feet.

Much of Velasco, first owned by John A. and William H. Wharton, was later sold to an agent of the English Rothschild family. They planned to establish a great seaport at the site. By 1896, the community had a new lighthouse, several churches, schools, hotels, a national bank, a cottonseed oil mill, cotton gins, special and general stores, and two weekly newspapers. Old Velasco and Crescent Beach could be reached by electric railroad.

=== Galveston Hurricane and aftermath ===
The population had reached 3,000 when the Galveston hurricane of 1900 wrecked the town. Velasco rebuilt slowly, enduring fluctuations of poverty and prosperity. By 1914, with a population of 1,000 and only one newspaper remaining, the community had a fish and oyster plant and shipped cattle, cotton, cane sugar, and syrup. The population dropped to a low of 400 in the mid-1930s during the Great Depression, when the town supported only 12 businesses.

=== Brazos River diversion and World War II ===
The port of Freeport had been built on the Brazos River four miles upstream. The river below the port required frequent dredging to accommodate larger ships. In 1929, the U.S. Army Corps of Engineers diverted the course of Brazos River three miles west, leaving the four-mile segment of the Old Brazos as a stand-alone ship channel.

Diversion of the Brazos River and the formation of a tidal estuary deep enough to accommodate large vessels in the old river channel subsequently revived both Velasco and nearby Freeport. Construction of chemical-industry facilities during World War II increased available jobs, and the population grew from 900 in 1940, when the city was incorporated with E. F. Roeller as mayor, to 5,200 by 1950.

With a population estimated at 4,000 in 1956, Velasco was annexed by Freeport on July 27, 1957. The community subsequently became part of the Brazosport industrial and port area and Brazosport Independent School District.

== Government and infrastructure ==
The Texas Department of Criminal Justice Clemens Unit is located in an unincorporated area in Brazoria County, near Velasco.

== Gallery ==
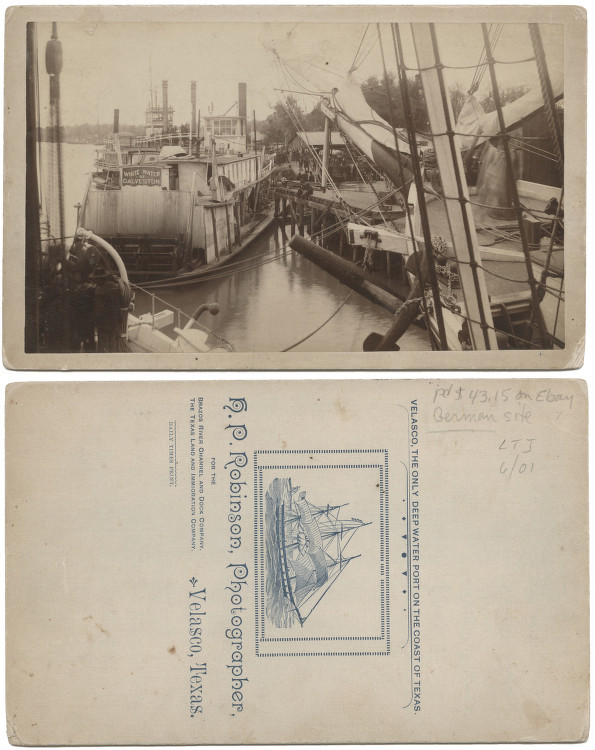
Riverboats at dock, Velasco, Texas
