= Fort Velasco =

Historical fort

- Velasco, Texas in Mexico (1821–1836); Republic of Texas (1836–1845); United States (1845–1865)
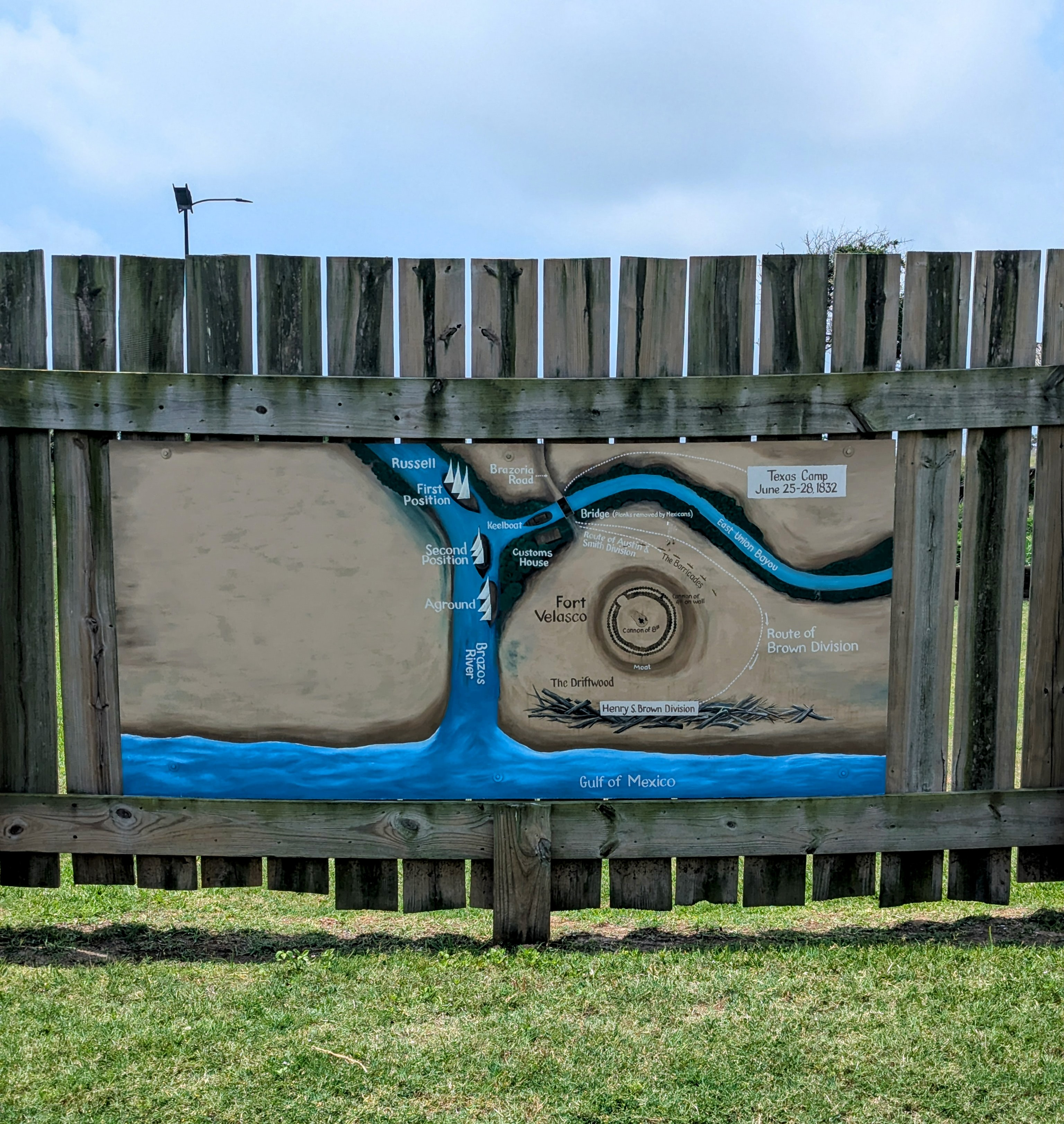
- Illustration of Fort Velasco

Site information
- Type: Garrison

Location
- Fort Velasco at Texas Brazos River Fort Velasco (the United States)
- Coordinates: 28.94217°N 95.30025°W

Site history
- Built: 1832
- In use: 1865
- Fate: Abandoned, demolished
- Battles/wars: Battle of Velasco
- Events: Treaties of Velasco

Garrison information
- Past commanders: Domingo Ugartechea

Fort Velasco was a small circular palisade fort built by a garrison of Mexican soldiers at (what would become known as) Velasco, Texas at the present-day location of Surfside Beach on the northeast bank at the mouth of the Brazos River and Texas Gulf Coast. The name also applies to at least three other forts built at almost the same location, one during the Texas Revolution, and two during the Civil War.

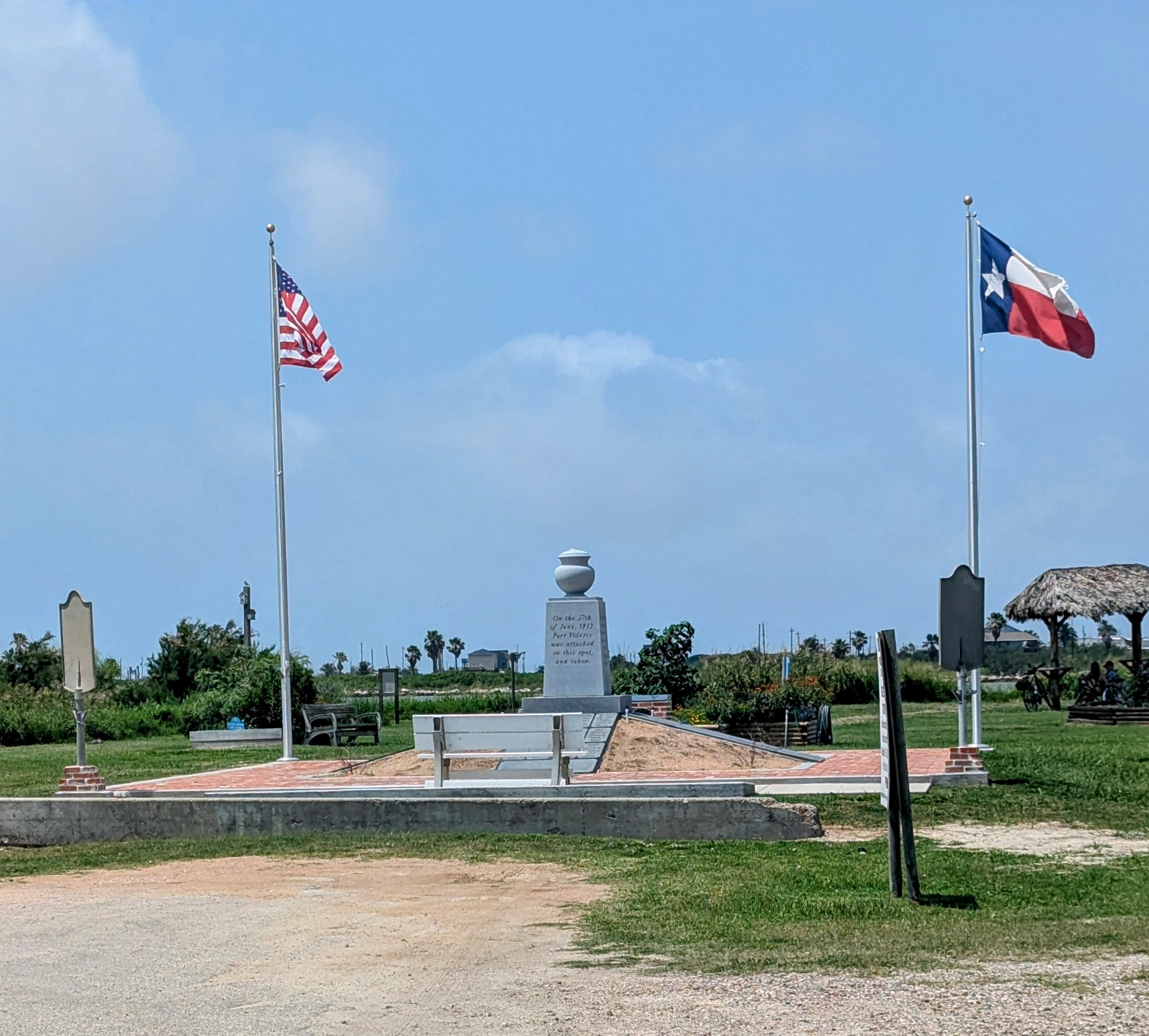
Fort Velasco Texas

In response to fear of annexation of Texas by the United States during the era of Mexican Texas, the Mexican Congress passed the Law of April 6, 1830, which halted legal immigration by Americans and established military occupation. Initially, sporadic efforts were made to establish a customs post at this location in 1830 and then again in 1831, but these efforts were less than successful. As a result, "Fortaleza de Velasco" was erected in April to May 1832 by the order of General Terán to enforce the customs and immigration provisions of the new law for the customs port of entry.

The original Fort Velasco has been briefly described in several first-hand or contemporaneous accounts. William J. Russell wrote “… The plan and structure of the fort were well understood, of circular form, of logs and sand, with strong stakes, sharpened, and placed close together, all around the embankment. In the center, stood a bastion, in height considerably above the outer wall, on top of which was mounted a long nine-pounder, worked on a pivot, and around which, on top of the bastion, was a parapet made of wood, about two feet in height.” Edwin Waller described it as "… fort of circular form, having in the center a mound or raised platform of earth, whereon the artillery was placed en barbette, so as to fire over the outer wall, and command a range on every side. This outer wall was surrounded by a fosse or ditch, and perhaps something intended for chevaux de frize or abattis." John H. Brown (whose father was in the Battle of Velasco) wrote “… The fort at Velasco stood about a hundred and fifty yards both from the river and the Gulf shore which formed a right angle. It consisted of parallel rows of posts six feet apart, filled between with sand, earth and shells, for the outer walls, Inside of the walls was an embankment on which musketeers could stand and shoot over without exposing anything but their heads. In the center was an elevation of the same material, inclosed by higher posts, on which the artillery was planted and protected by bulwarks."

Soon after its construction, the fort was the site of a skirmish called the Battle of Velasco in the period of June 25–29, 1832, as one episode of the Anahuac Disturbances, which was an early indication of unrest leading up to the Texas Revolution. After an overnight battle, the Mexican forces inside the fort surrendered (primarily due to lack of ammunition) to the Texian forces besieging the fort, and an armistice was signed on June 29, 1832, with the Mexican forces being allowed to return to Matamoros. Although the armistice agreement called for them to be transported by sea to Matamoros, the lack of a seaworthy vessel resulted in the troops marching overland via San Felipe de Austin and La Bahia back to Matamoros. After the battle, the fort was abandoned, and was probably scavenged for materials as the new town of Velasco grew up around its location.

In the period of late 1835 and early 1836, as the Texas Revolution began, a new fort was constructed nearby mounting several large cannon, known as the best protected location on the coast. The Treaties of Velasco which recognized Texas Independence from Mexico were signed at this location on May 14, 1836. This fort was occupied for an extended period, at least through 1840. After the Battle of San Jacinto resulted in the independence of Texas on April 21, 1836, the "interim" government chose to establish itself at Velasco, due to available accommodations (as many other towns had been destroyed in the Runaway Scrape or during the Revolution), and the protection offered by this fort and the newly built and robust Republic Of Texas Navy, in the period of May to Oct-1836. The government's records were kept at Velasco for a short period, and the fort was occupied with a small garrison. Financial warrants, notes and pay certificates were issued by the government from Velasco. Elections were held in Sep-1836, after which the government moved to a new capital at Columbia, as the first "democratically-elected" government. This second Fort Velasco was eventually abandoned after 1840 and was longer in existence by 1852.

During the early part of Civil War, an early fort (also named as Fort Velasco) was built near the location of the Republic Of Texas fort, mounting two 18-pound cannon, but was augmented in the winter of 1863-1863 by a larger stacked-earth emplacement with five gun platforms known as Fort Sulakowski or Fort Velasco, at a point nearer the existing town. Armament consisted of one 30-pound Parrot gun, one 32-pounder Navy gun, one 24-pound and one 18-pound Sea coast guns, and one 12-pounder.

== Texas Historical Commission Site ==
Velasco received a historical marker in 1965 by the Texas Historical Commission acknowledging the 1832 conflict between the Mexican Monarchy forces and the Texian colonists. The strife for Texas independence was confirmed on May 14, 1836, in Velasco debilitating the Mexican territorial boundary dispute and subsequently creating the Republic of Texas.

== Gallery ==
Fort Velasco Memorial Plaques

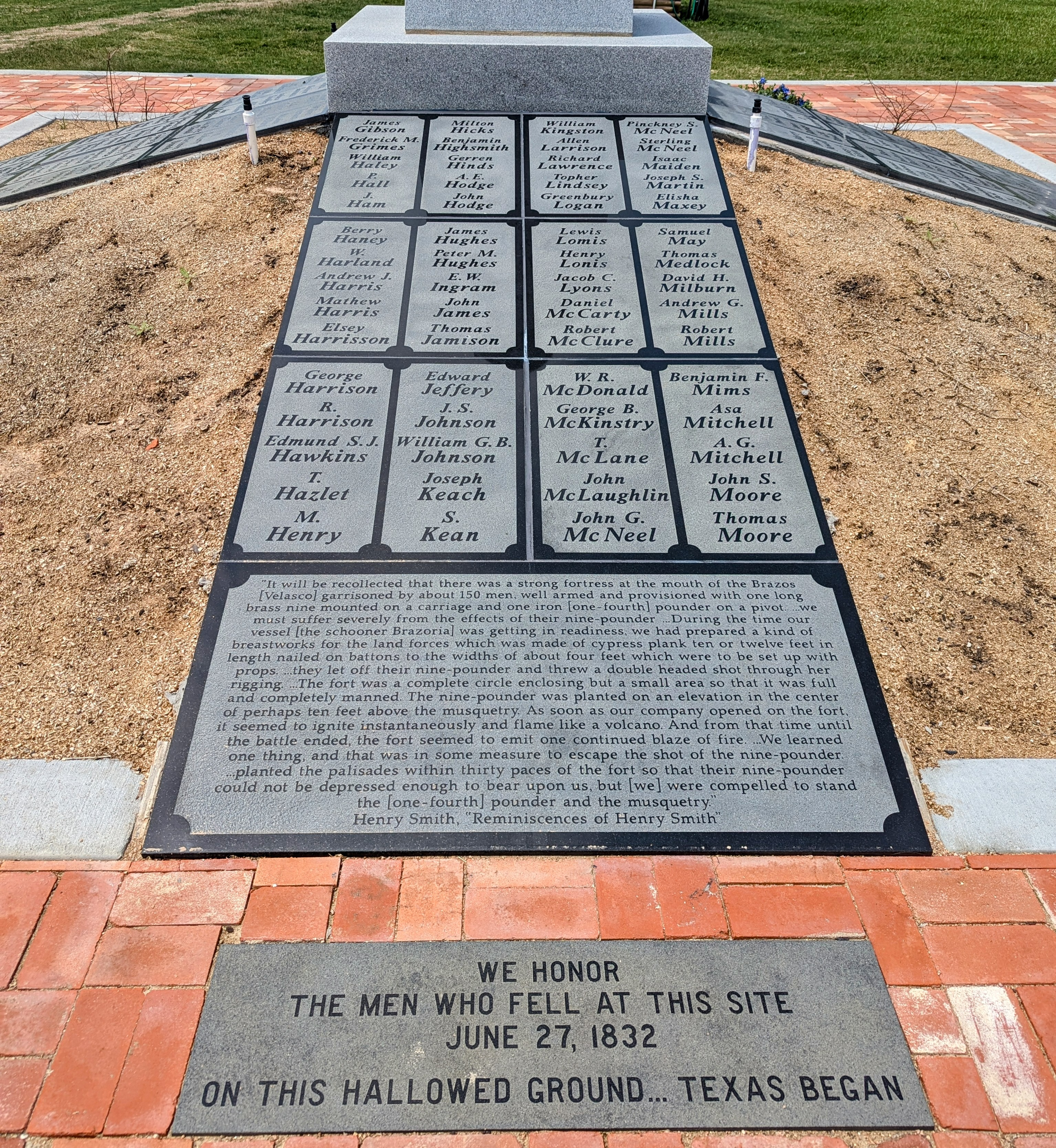
Fort Velasco Memorial Plaques 1 of 4

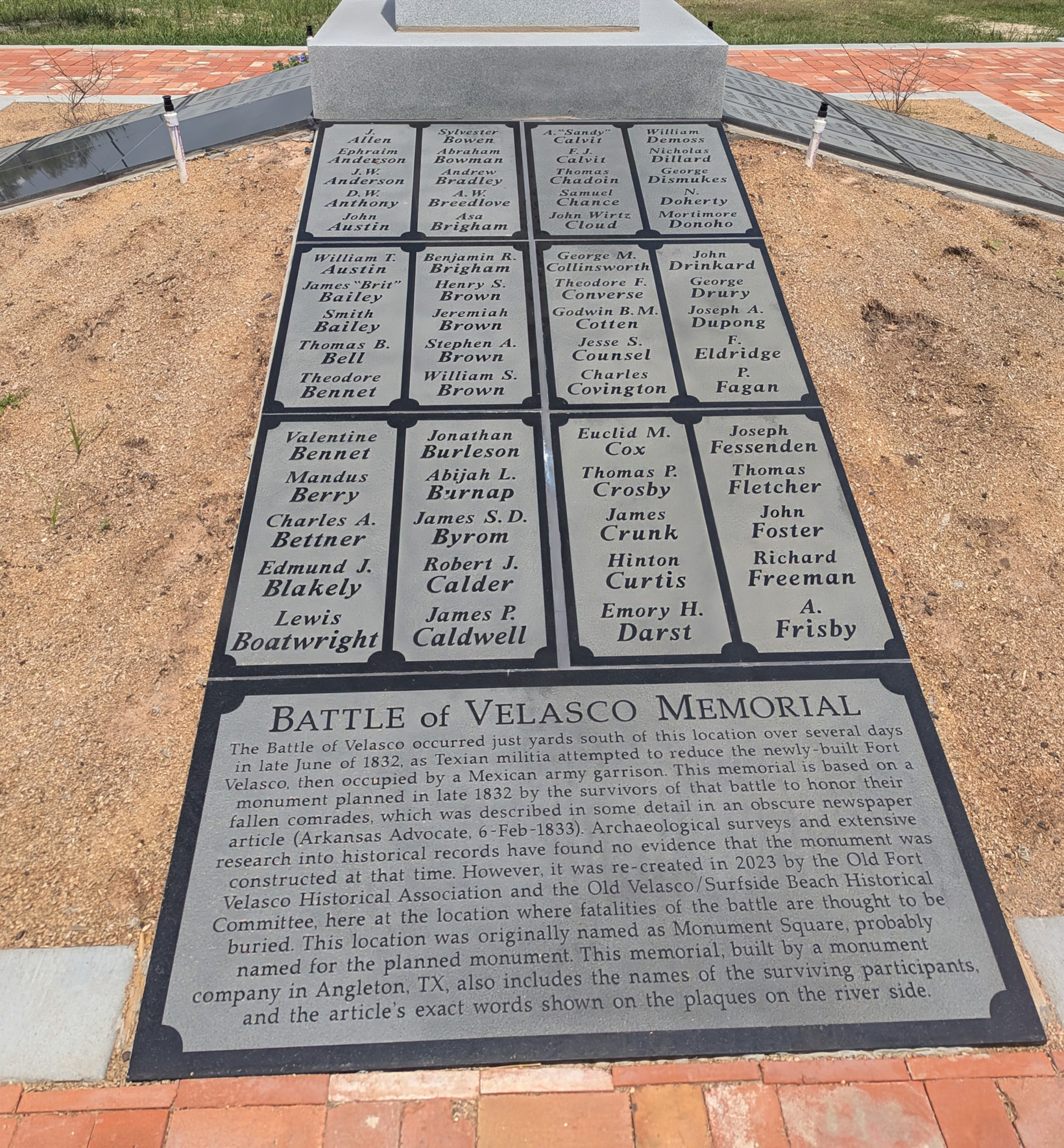
Fort Velasco Memorial Plaques 2 of 4

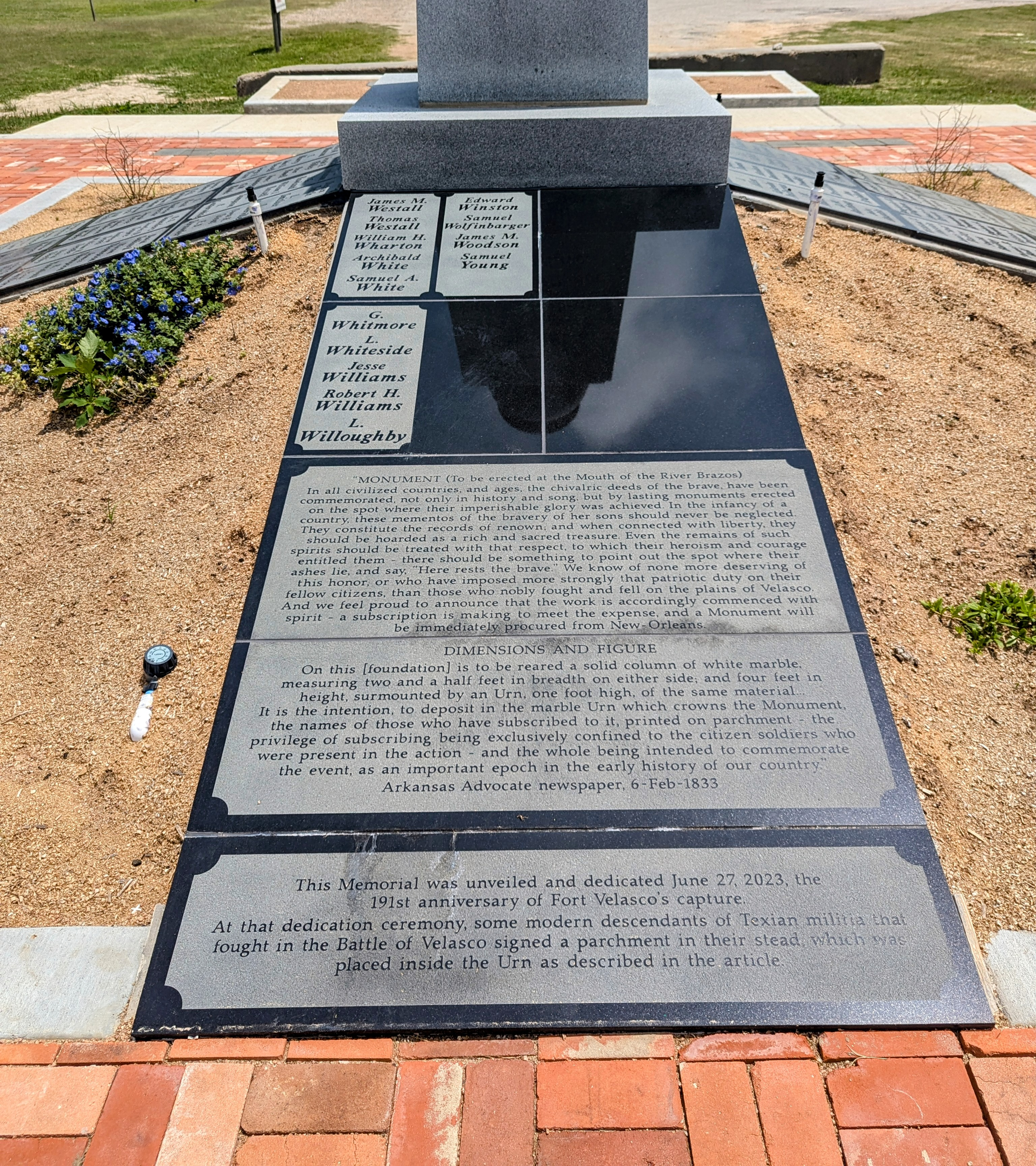
Fort Velasco Memorial Plaques 3 of 4

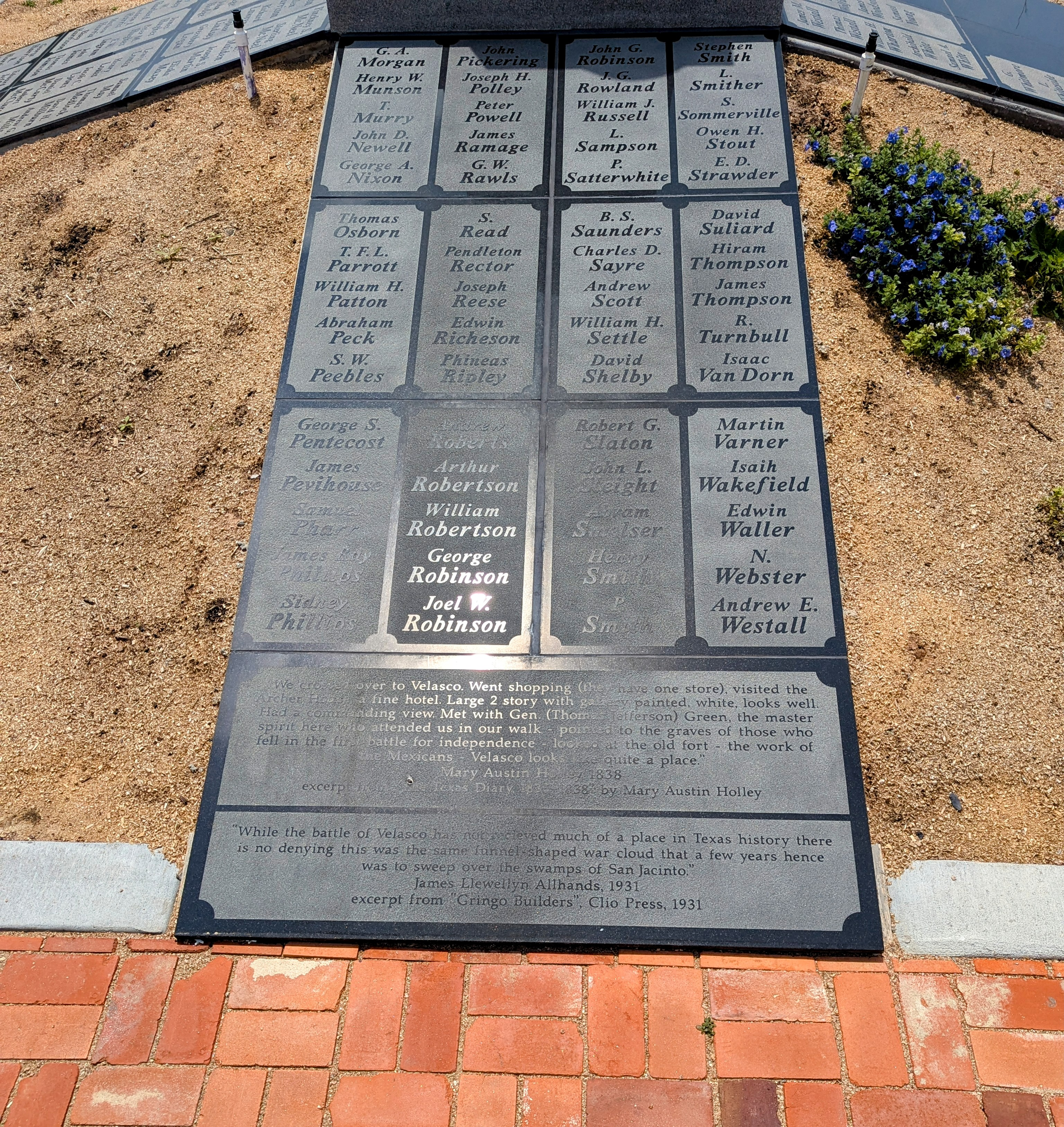
Fort Velasco Memorial Plaques 4 of 4
Fort Velasco murals

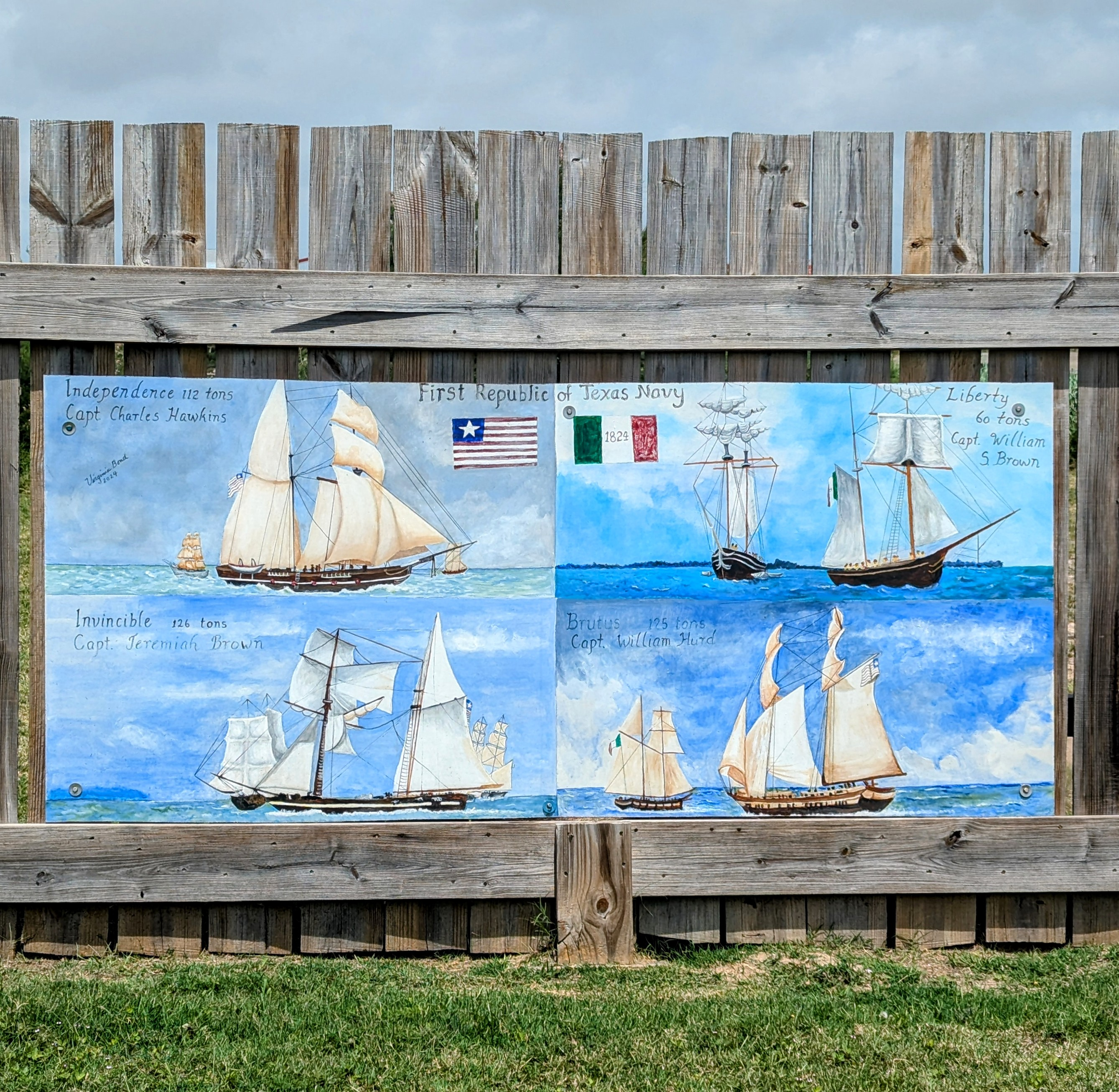
Fort Velasco Mural 1

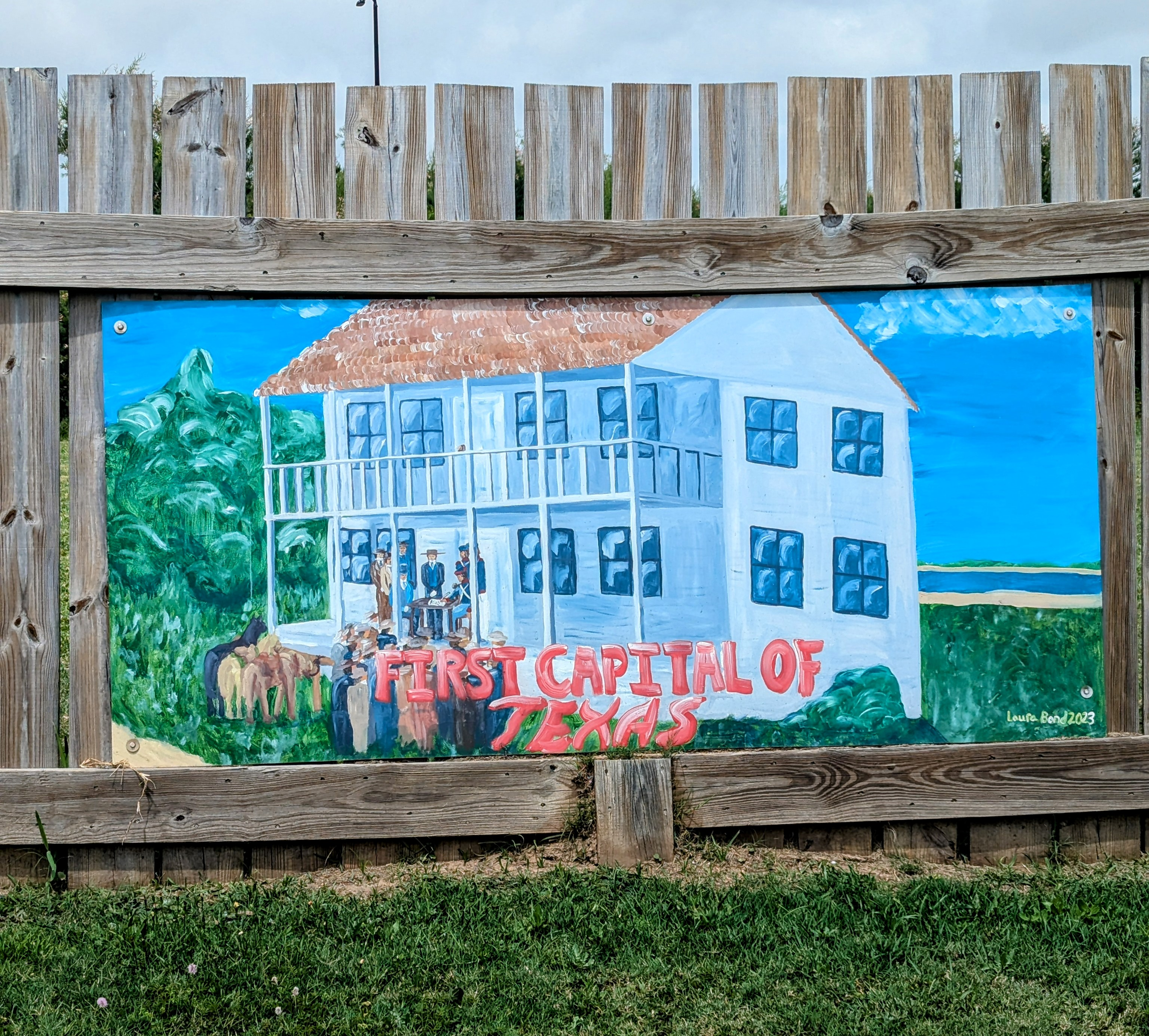
Fort Velasco Mural 2

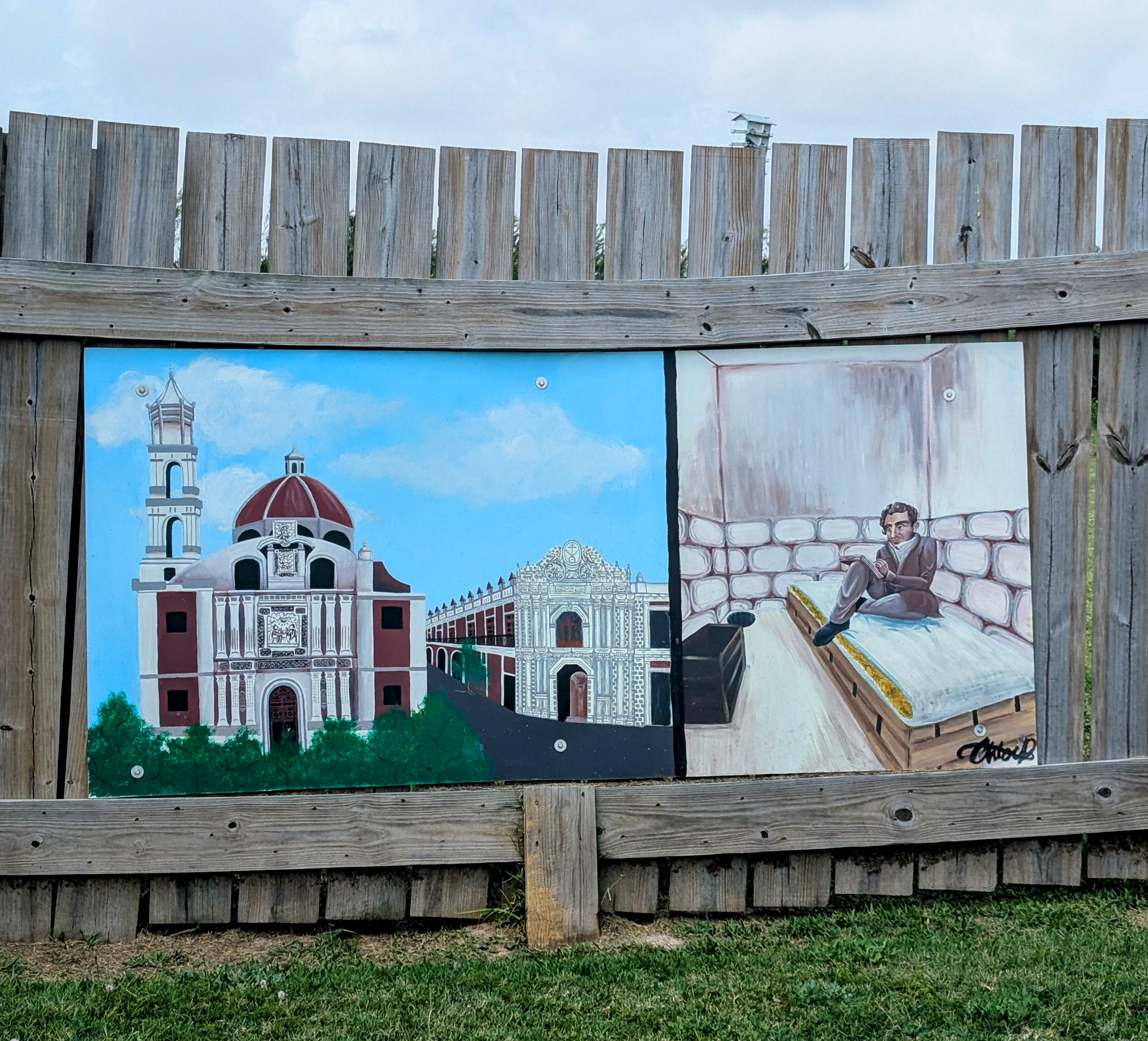
Fort Velasco Mural 3

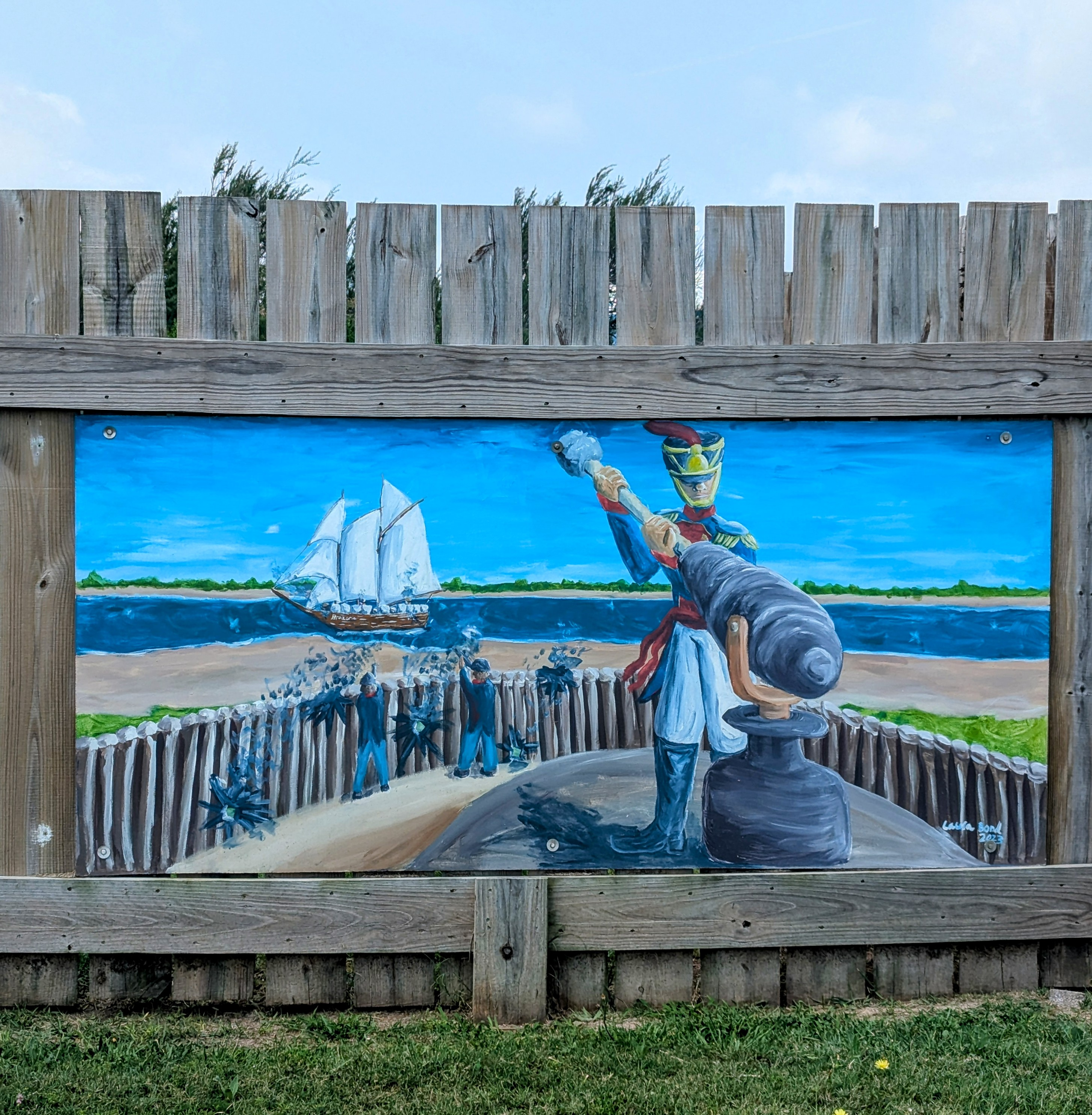
Fort Velasco Mural 4

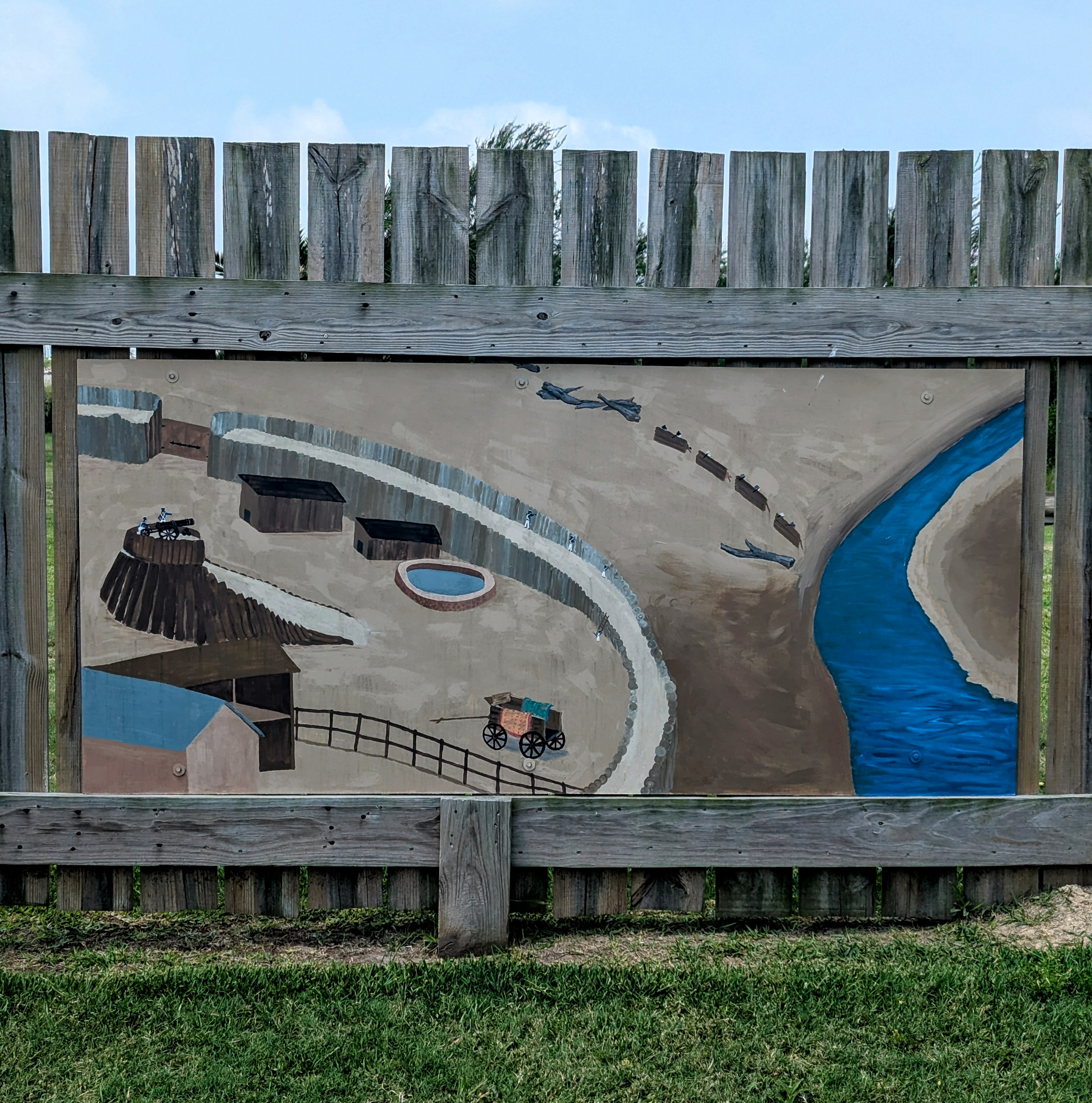
Fort Velasco Mural 5

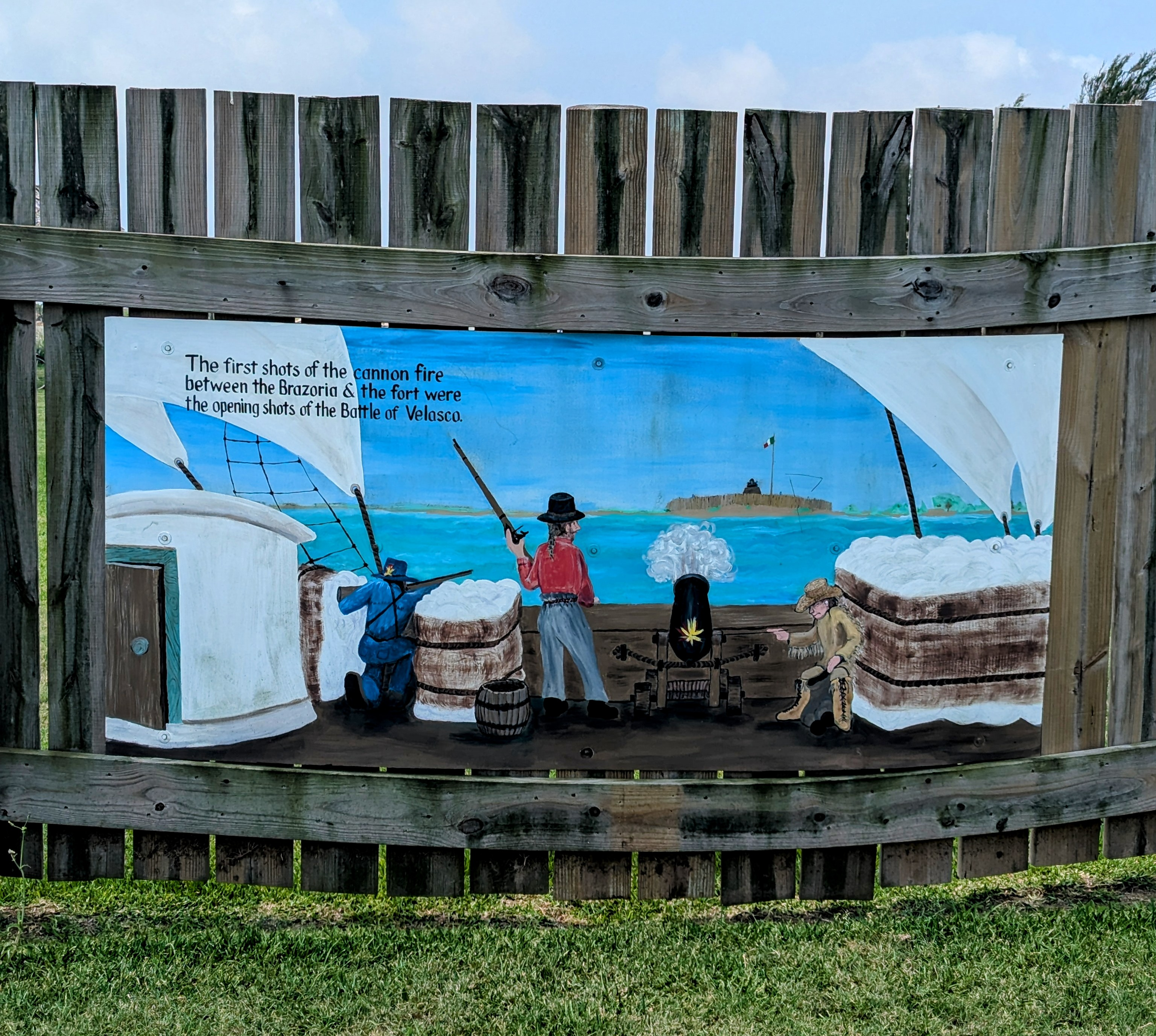
Fort Velasco Mural 6

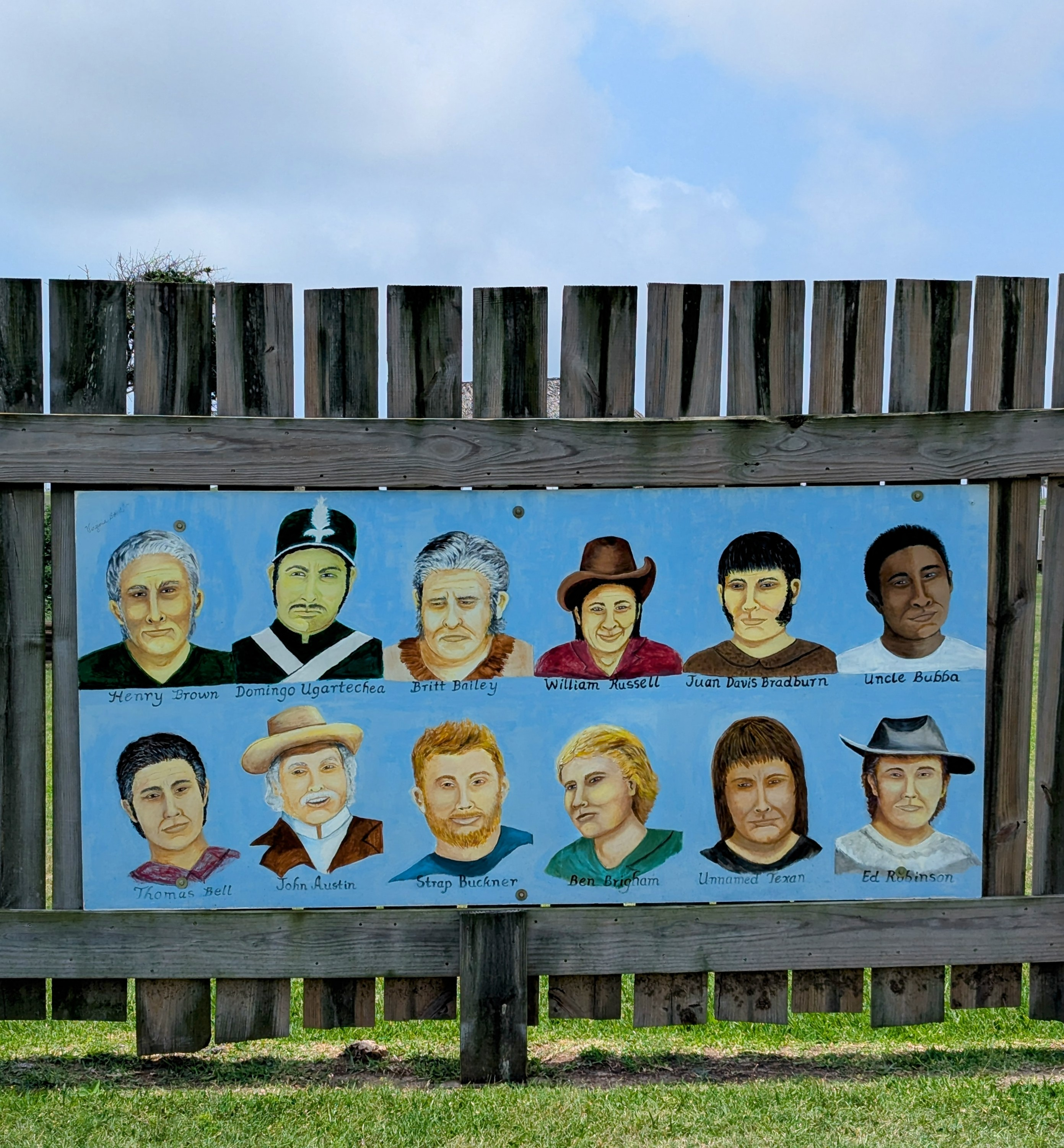
Fort Velasco Mural 7

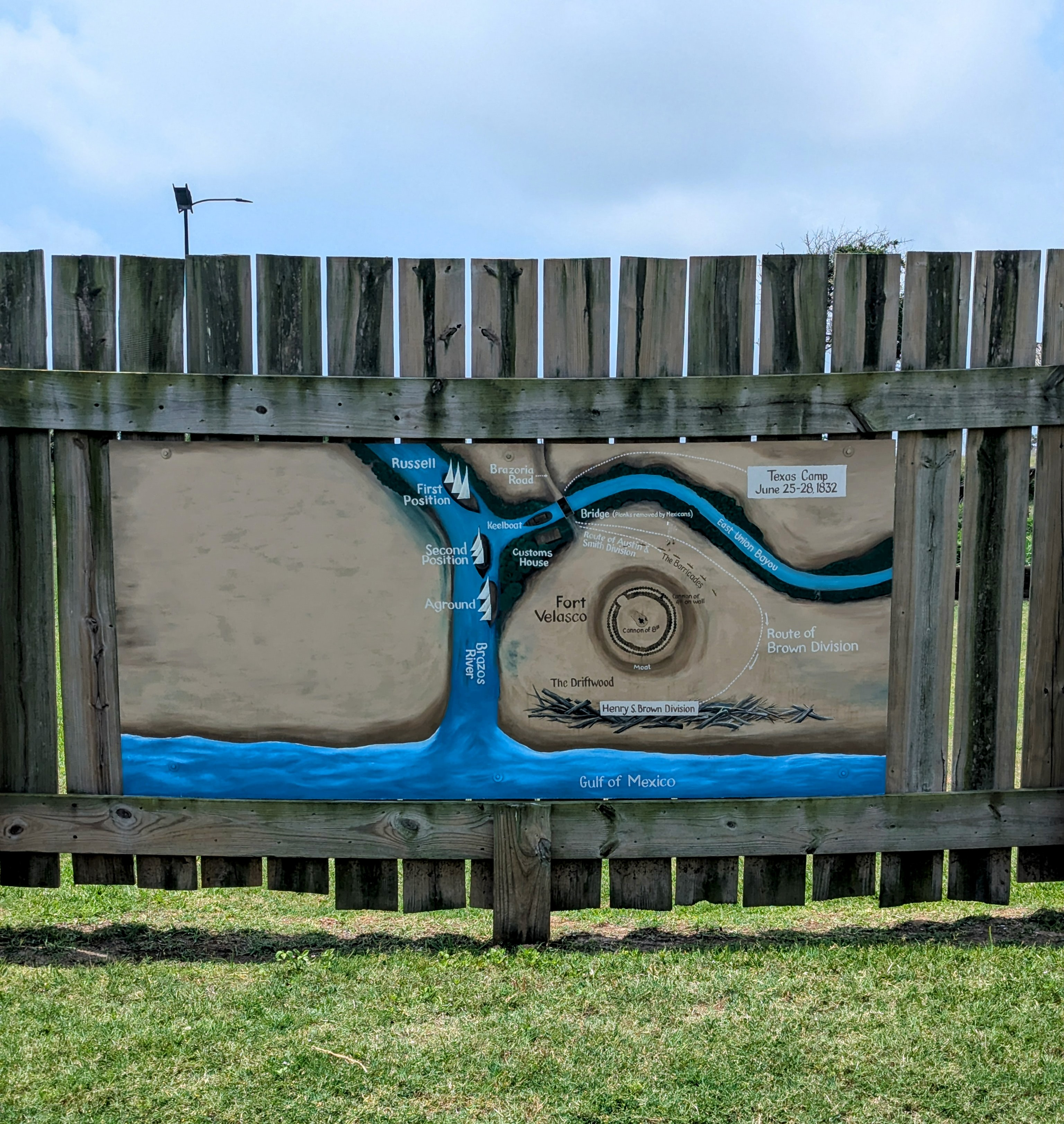
Fort Velasco Mural 8

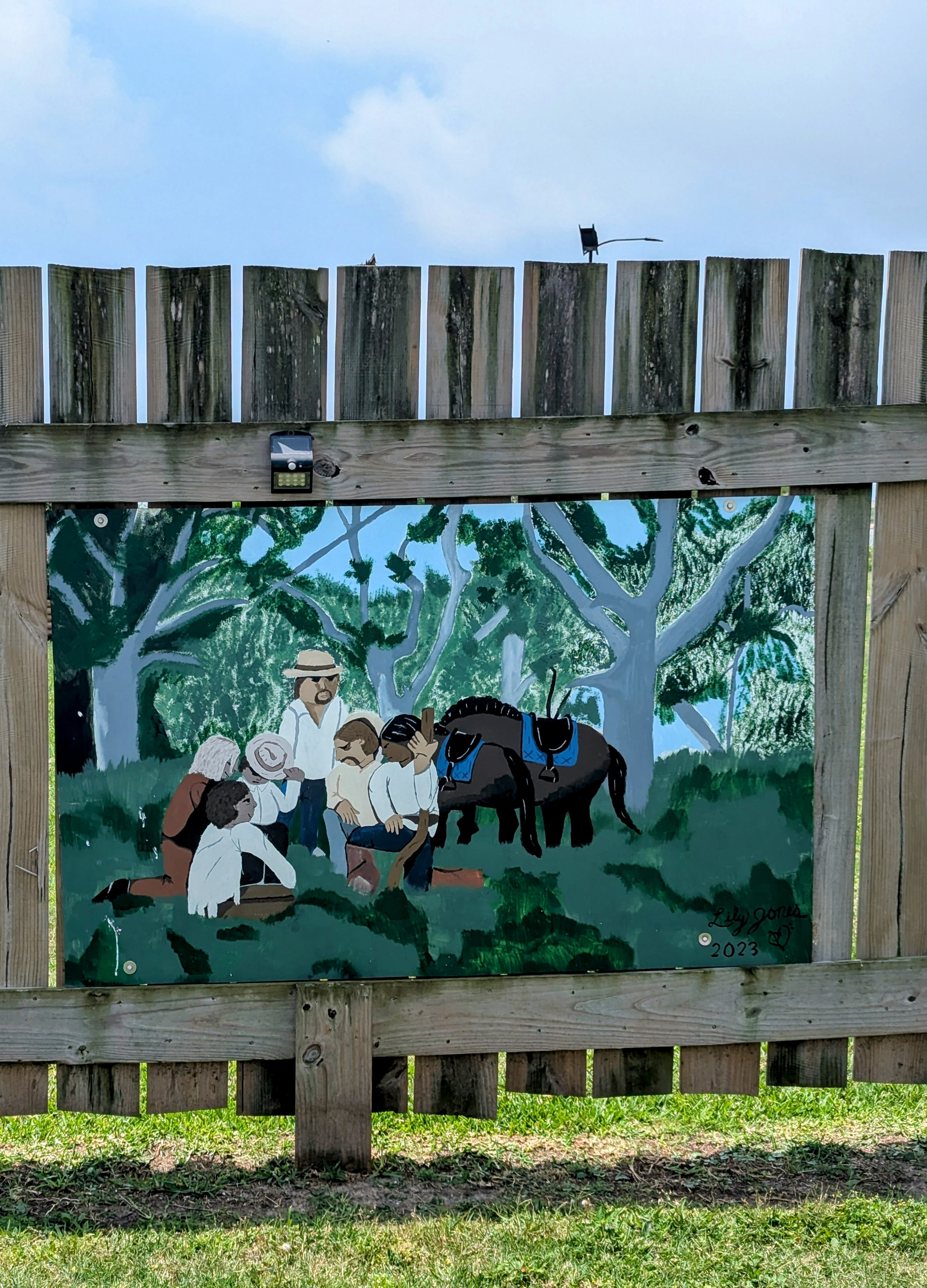
Fort Velasco Mural 9

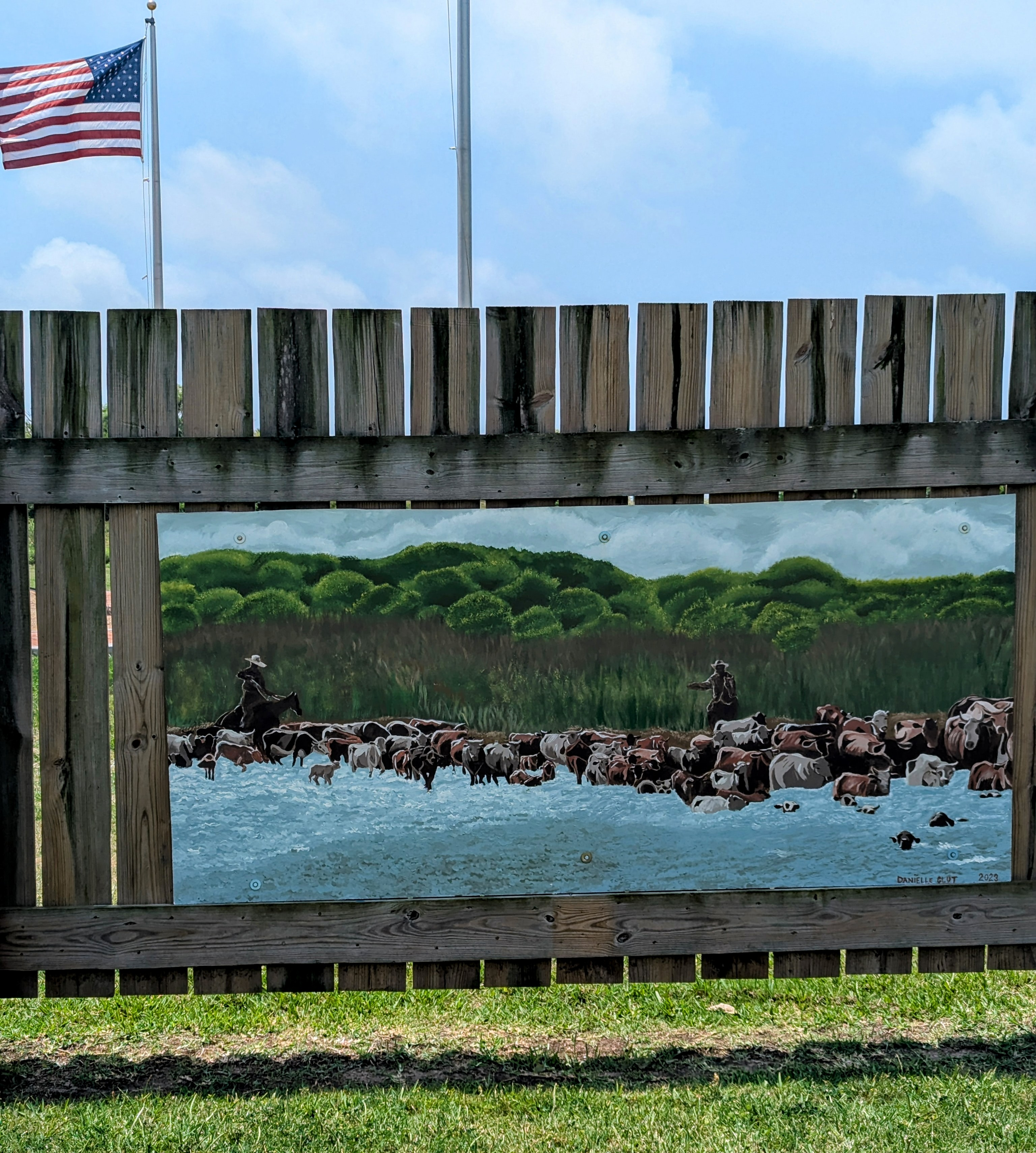
Fort Velasco Mural 10

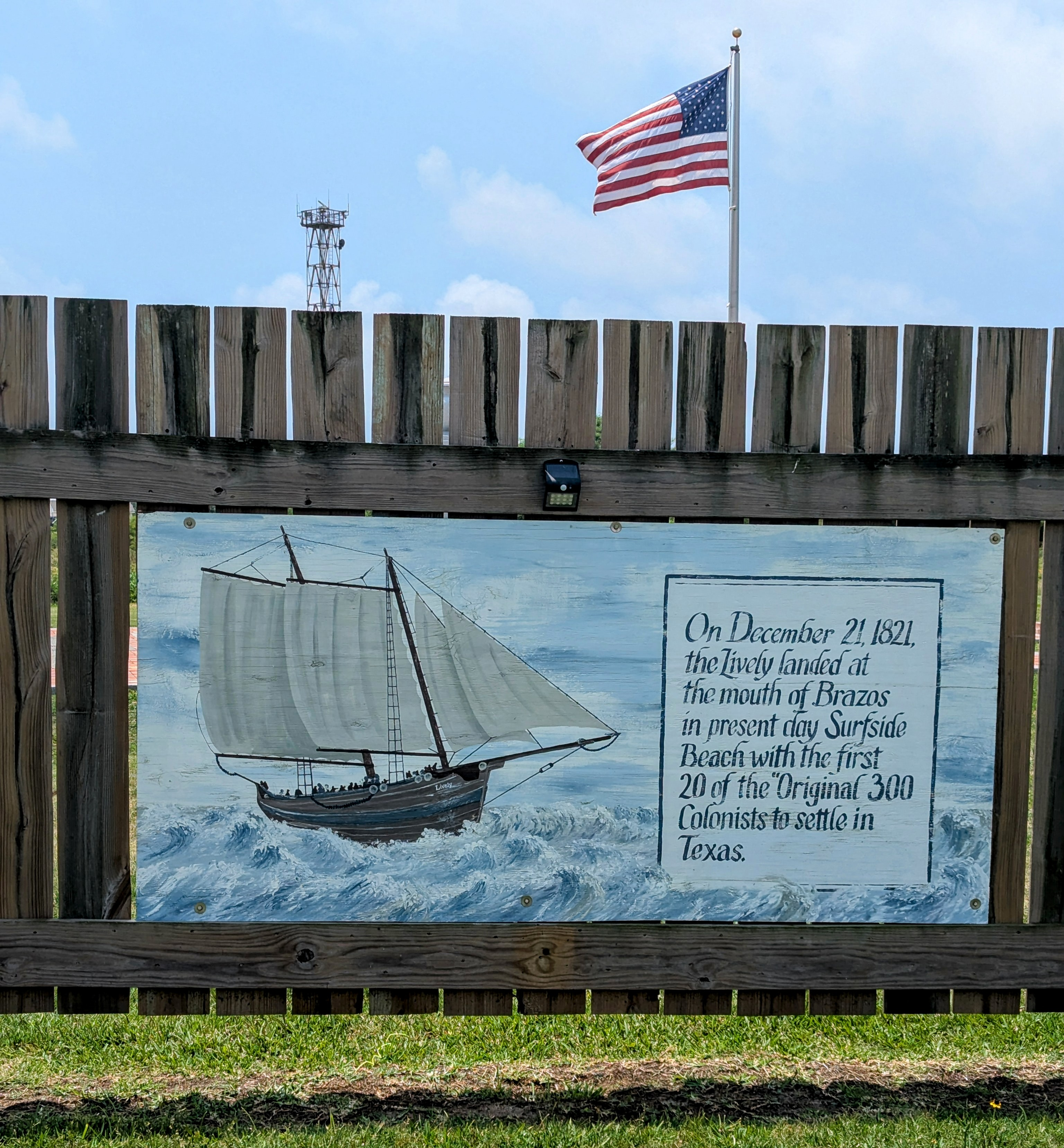
Fort Velasco Mural 11

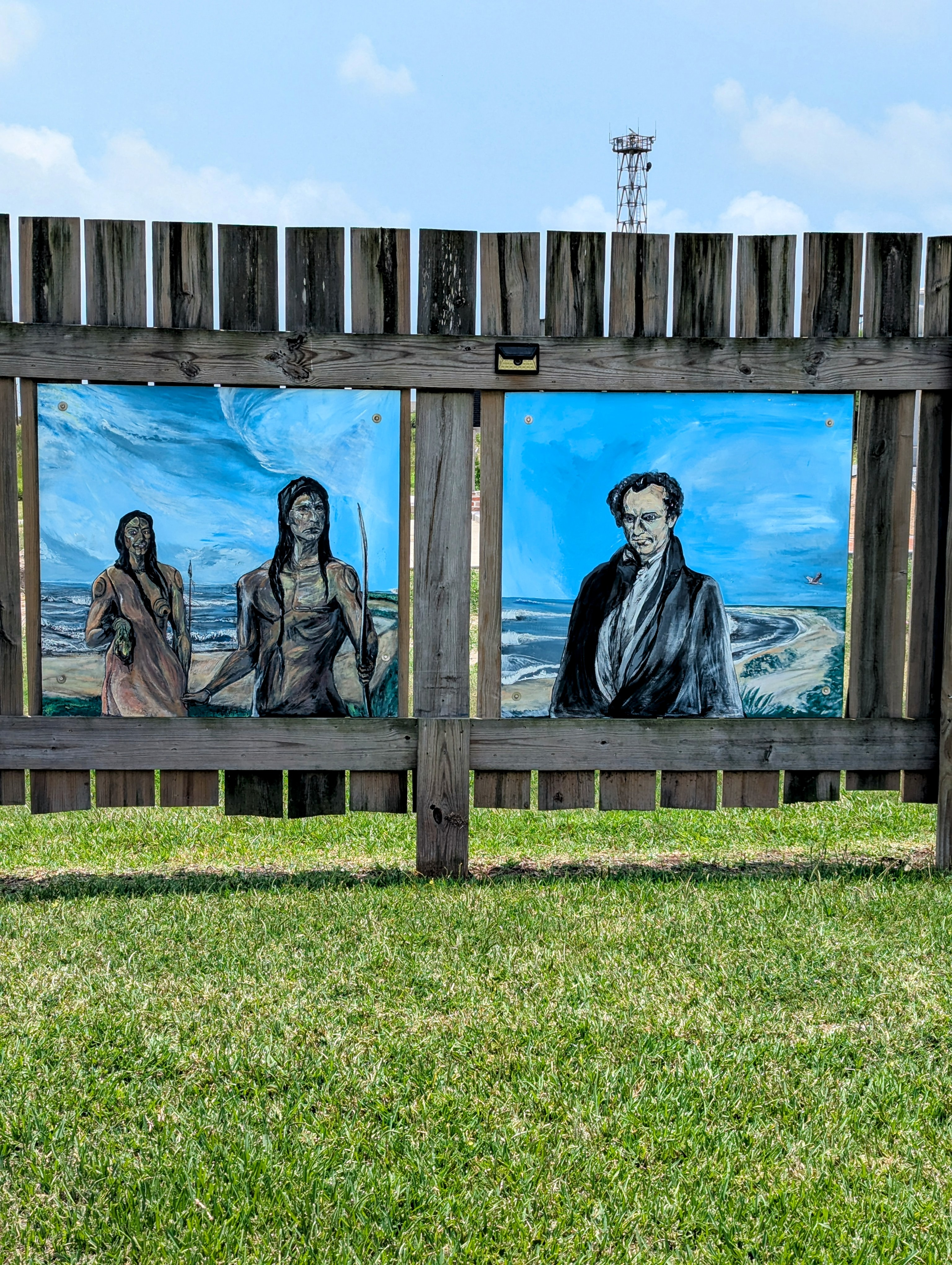
Fort Velasco Mural 12

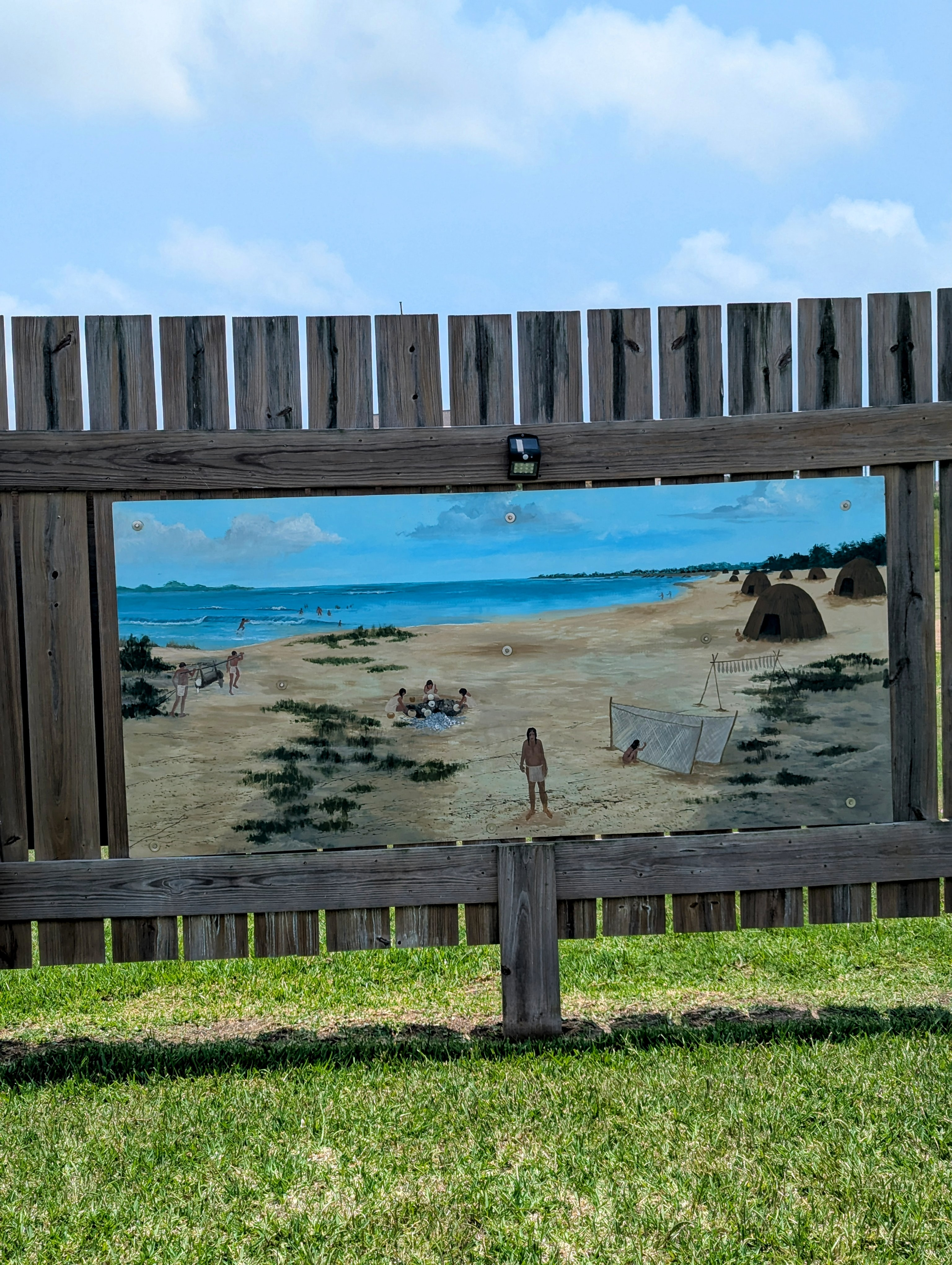
Fort Velasco Mural 13

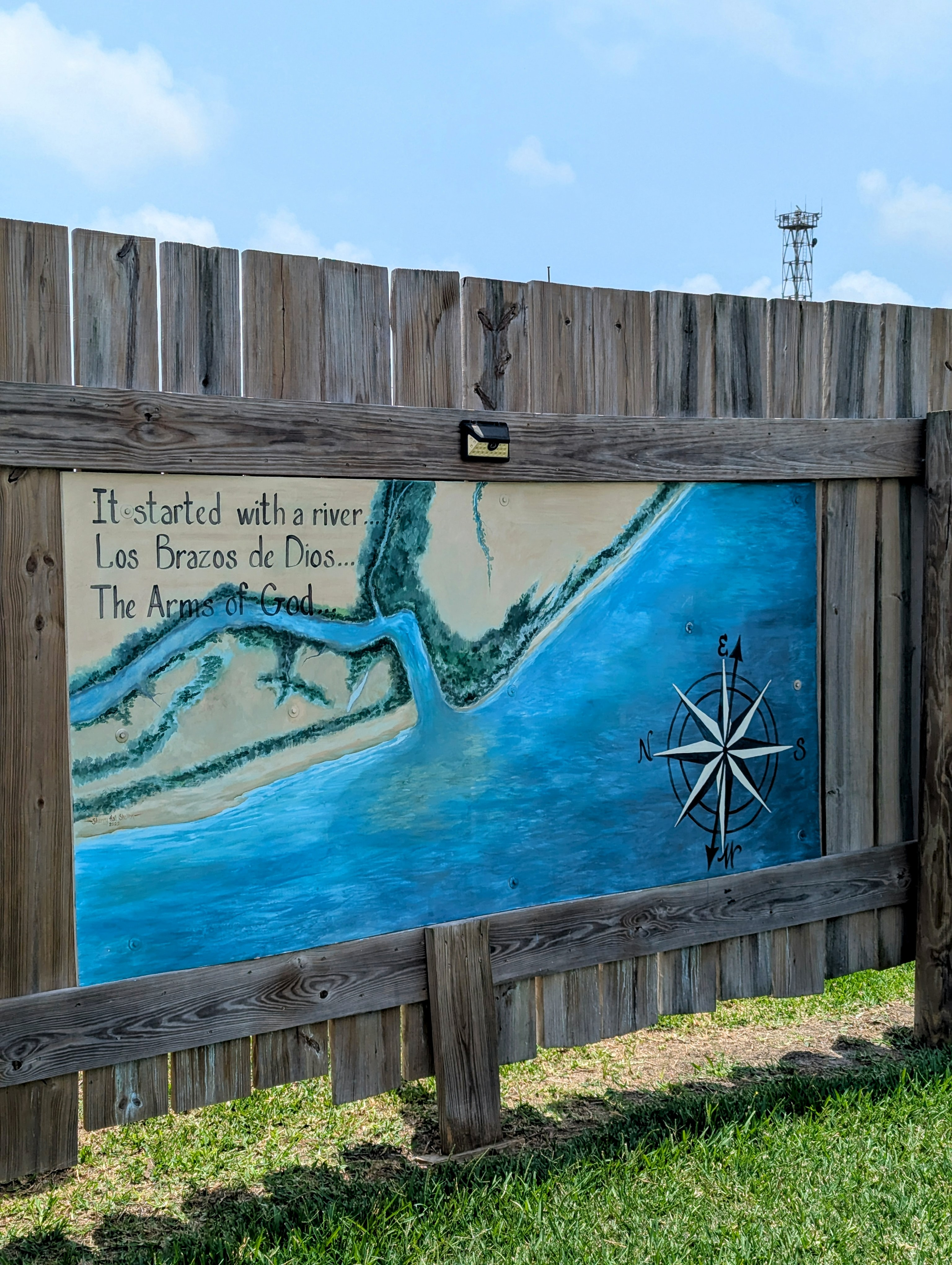
Fort Velasco Mural 14
Fort Velasco misc photos

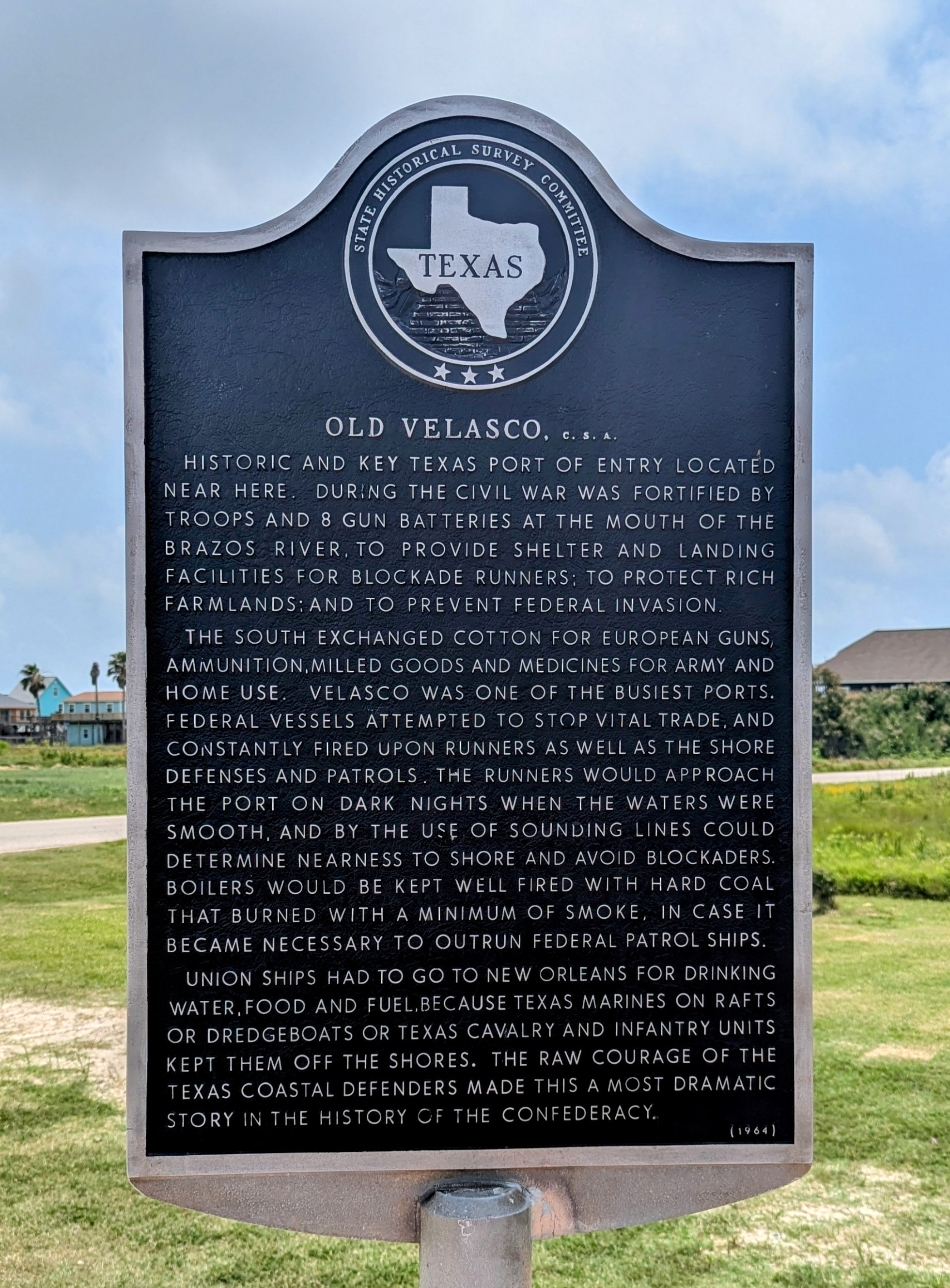
Fort Velasco Texas Historical Marker

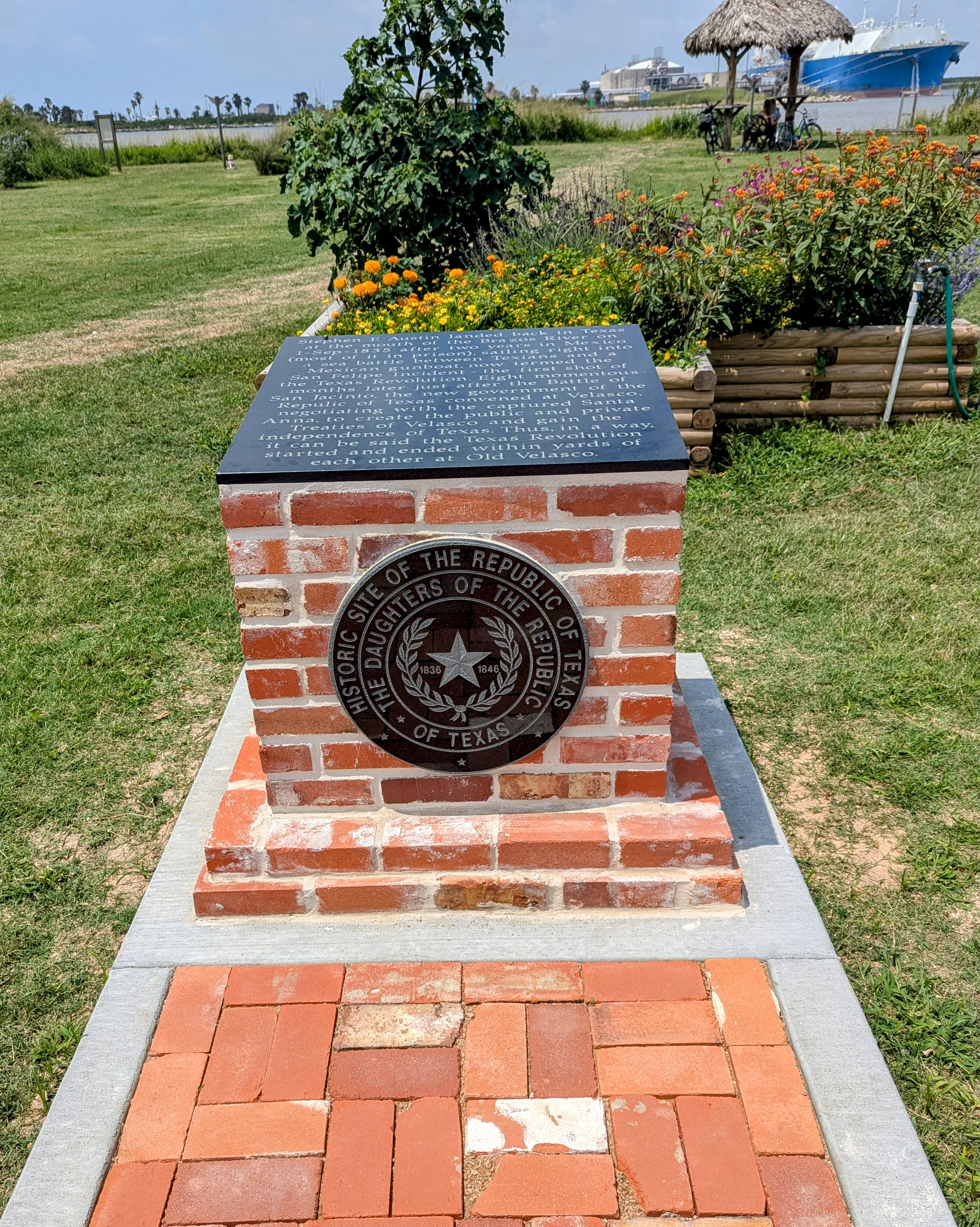
Fort Velasco Memorial

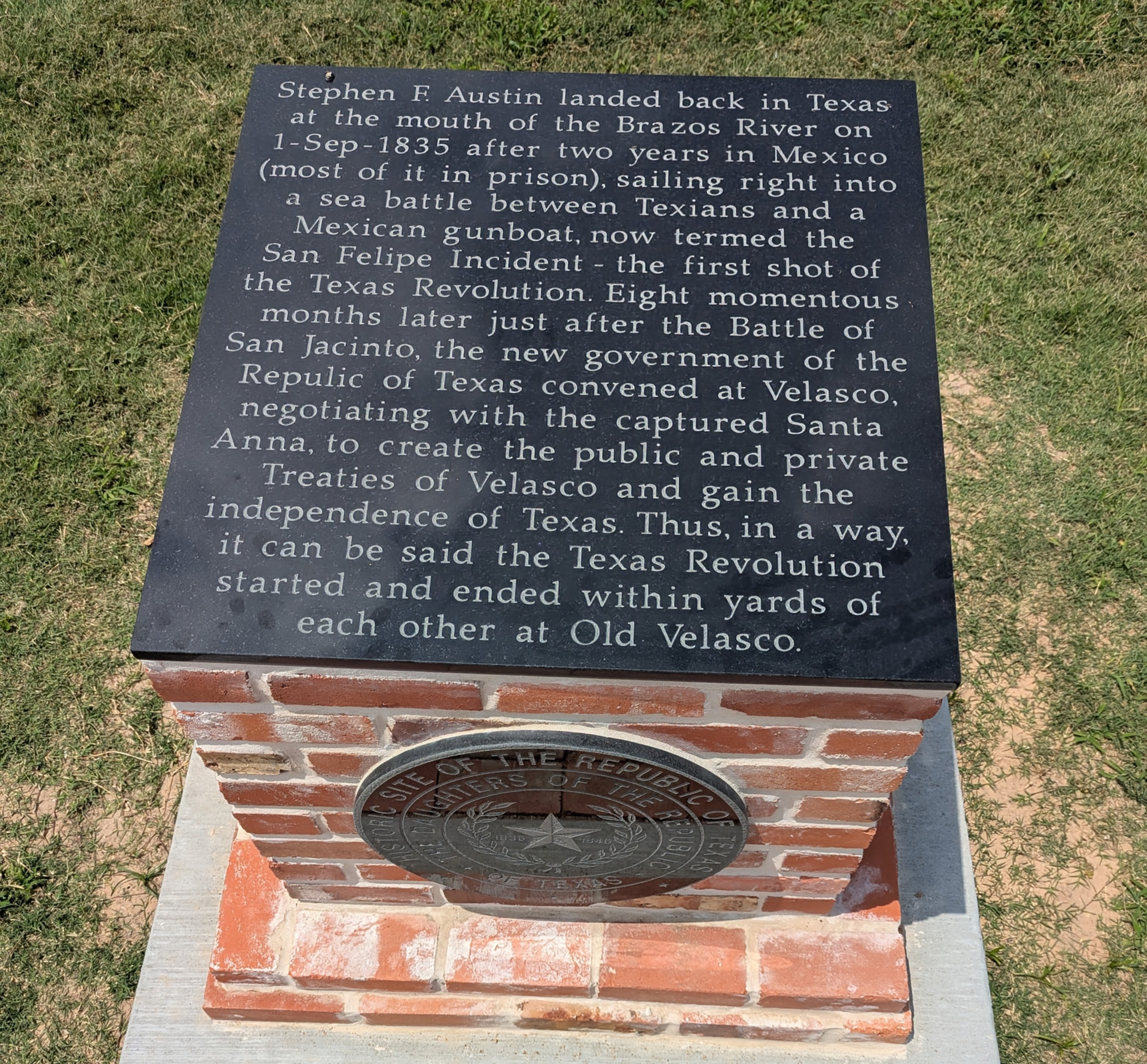
The Daughters of the Republic of Texas at Fort Velasco
