= Treaties of Velasco =

1836 documents which ended the Texas Revolution

The Treaties of Velasco (Spanish: Tratados de Velasco) were two documents, one private and the other public, signed in Fort Velasco on May 14, 1836 between General Antonio López de Santa Anna and the Republic of Texas in the aftermath of the Battle of San Jacinto on April 21, 1836. The fort was located in the former Velasco, Texas, now part of the present-day location of Surfside Beach. The signatories were interim president David G. Burnet for Texas and Santa Anna for Mexico. Texas intended the agreements to conclude hostilities between the two armies and offer the first steps toward the official recognition of Texas's independence from Mexico.

Santa Anna had been captured by Texans. Many wanted him hanged as just vengeance for the murder of comrades and family during the battles at Alamo and Goliad, but Sam Houston spared his life and extracted a promise from Santa Anna that Mexican troops would be removed from Texas. Santa Anna persuaded Burnet that if he were allowed to return to Mexico City, he would argue for the independence of Texas. Santa Anna signed both the public agreement and the secret treaty, but neither was ratified as a treaty by the Mexican government because he had signed them under duress while being held captive. Santa Anna later said, "I did promise to try to get a hearing for the Texas Commissioners, but this in itself did not bind the government to receive them."

The Mexican Congress considered Santa Anna's actions scandalous and nullified both. Mexican conservatives removed Santa Anna as president and installed Anastasio Bustamante, and there was an agreement with the Mexican Congress that Santa Anna had "offered nothing in the name of the nation."

A biographer of Santa Anna, Will Fowler, considered that the "general of tricks was at his most ingenious" with the negotiations with Texas since he did not commit himself to do anything other than to permit Texas commissioners to present their case to the Mexican government. He was "no longer in a position to act freely, and anything he said or signed would not be validated by Congress" since as a captive, he was no longer president. A draft of the agreement, which Santa Anna refused to sign until it was amended, stated that he recognized as "Head of the Mexican Nation" Texas's independence, text that was later dropped. Santa Anna sent a message to General Vicente Filisola to retreat below the Rio Grande, but his message made it clear that Filisola was in charge. Fowler argues that Filisola should have known that Santa Anna was in no position to be issuing orders since he had been captured. Both Filisola and Santa Anna were blamed for the defeat, but signing the Velasco documents did not commit either Santa Anna or Mexico to Texas independence.

Mexico still claimed Texas but was too weak to attempt to reconquer it; thus, Texas was de facto independent. The documents were not even called "treaties" until they were so characterized by U.S. president James K. Polk in his justifications for war some ten years later, as U.S. representative Abraham Lincoln pointed out in 1848. Lincoln's efforts earned the freshman Whig U.S. representative the derisive sobriquet "Spotty" Lincoln because of his Spot Resolutions, which demanded to know that the "spot" at which American troops were killed was on American soil, which Polk argued to justify war with Mexico.

== Text of Public Agreement ==
This is the text of the Public Agreement:

=== Untitled preamble ===
Articles of an agreement entered into between his Excellency David G. Burnet President of the Republic of Texas of the one part & His Excellency General Antonio Lopez de Santa Ana President-General in Chief of the other part--

=== Article 1 ===
General Antonio López de Santa Anna agrees that he will not take up arms, nor will he exercise his influence to cause them to be taken up against Texas's people during the present war of Independence.

=== Article 2 ===
All hostilities between the Mexican and Texan troops will cease immediately both on land and water.

=== Article 3 ===
The Mexican troops will evacuate the Territory of Texas, passing to the other side of the Rio Grande del Norte.

=== Article 4 ===
The Mexican Army in its retreat shall not take the property of any person without his consent and just indemnification, using only such articles as may be necessary for its subsistence, in cases when the owner may not be present, and remitting to the commander of the army of Texas or to the commissioner to be appointed for the adjustment of such matters, an account of the value of the property consumed—the place where taken, and the name of the owner, if it can be ascertained.

=== Article 5 ===
That all private property including cattle, horses, negro slaves or indentured persons of whatever denomination, that may have been captured by any portion of the Mexican army or may have taken refuge in the said army since the commencement of the late invasion, shall be restored to the Commander of the Texian army, or to such other persons as may be appointed by the Government of Texas to receive them.

=== Article 6 ===
The troops of both armies will refrain from coming into contact with each other. To this end, the Commander of Texas's army will be careful not to approach within a shorter distance of the Mexican army than five leagues.

=== Article 7 ===
The Mexican army shall not make any other delay on its march than that which is necessary to take up their hospitals, baggage [---] and cross the rivers—any delay not necessary to these purposes to be considered an infraction of this agreement.

=== Article 8 ===
By express to be immediately dispatched, this agreement shall be sent to General Filisola and to General T. J. Rusk, commander of the Texian Army, to be apprised of its stipulations to this, and they will exchange engagements to comply with the same.

=== Article 9 ===
That all Texan prisoners now in possession of the Mexican Army or its authorities be forthwith released and furnished with free passports to return to their homes, in consideration of which a corresponding number of Mexican prisoners, rank, and file, now in possession of the Government of Texas shall be immediately released. The remainder of the Mexican prisoners that continue in possession of the Government of Texas to be treated with due humanity—any extraordinary comforts that may be furnished them to be at the charge of the Government of Mexico.

=== Article 10 ===
General Antonio López de Santa Anna will be sent to Veracruz as soon as it shall be deemed proper.

== Text of Secret Treaty ==
This is the text of the Secret Treaty:

Antonio Lopez de Santa Anna, General in Chief of the Army of Operations and President of the Republic of Mexico, before the Government established in Texas, solemnly pledges himself to fulfill the stipulations contained in the following Articles, so far as concerns himself.

=== Article 1 ===
He will not take up arms nor cause them to be taken up against the People of Texas during the present War of Independence.

=== Article 2 ===
He will give his Orders that, in the shortest time, the Mexican Troops may leave the Territory of Texas [sic].

=== Article 3 ===
He will so prepare matters in the Cabinet of Mexico that the Mission that may be sent thither by the Government of Texas may be well received. By means of negotiations, all differences may be settled. The Independence that has been declared by the Convention may be acknowledged.

=== Article 4 ===
A treaty of Commerce, Amity, and limits will be established between Mexico and Texas. The territory of the latter not to extend beyond the Rio Bravo del Norte.

== Nonratification by Mexico ==
Although Mexican General Vicente Filisola began troop withdrawals on May 26, 1836, the government of Mexican President José Justo Corro in Mexico City resolved on May 20 to disassociate itself from all undertakings by Santa Anna while he was held captive. Mexico's position was that Santa Anna had no legal standing with the Mexican government to agree to those terms or negotiate a treaty.

Santa Anna's position was that he had signed the documents under coercion as a prisoner, not as a surrendering general in accordance with the laws of war. In fact, he had no authority under the Mexican Constitution to make a treaty, and the Mexican government never ratified the agreements.

== Santa Anna's return to Veracruz ==
Santa Anna was not allowed to return to Veracruz until 1837. He was kept as a prisoner-of-war ("clapped in irons for six months," he later claimed) in Velasco and then in the Orozimbo Plantation, before he was taken to Washington, DC, to meet with US President Andrew Jackson, ostensibly to negotiate a lasting peace between Mexico and Texas, with the US acting as mediator. Sailing on the frigate USS Pioneer, the "guest" of the US Navy, he did not arrive in Veracruz until February 23, 1837.

== Aftermath ==
Because the provisions of the public agreements had not been met, the terms of the secret agreement were not released until much later. Neither the de facto independence of Texas nor its later annexation by the United States was formally recognized by Mexico until the 1848 Treaty of Guadalupe Hidalgo, which ended the Mexican–American War and recognized the Rio Grande (Río Bravo del Norte) as the Mexico–United States border.

== See also ==
- Bibliography of the Mexican American War
- Bibliography of James K. Polk
