= Texas Independence Trail =

- Founder: Texas Historical Commission
- Purpose: Tourism, Economic Development and Historical Preservation
- Location: San Antonio, Texas
- Website: www.texasindependencetrail.com//

The Texas Independence Trail is a non-profit organization which promotes heritage tourism, economic development, and historic preservation. It is one of ten regions which make up the Texas Heritage Trails Program of the Texas Historical Commission.

== History ==
In 1968 Texas hosted the World's fair, known as HemisFair '68, in San Antonio, Texas. In connection with this boost in international attention, the Texas Department of Transportation designated ten 790-mile circular driving regions that encompassed the entire state of Texas. These trails saw little attention after their creation until in the late 1990s when the Texas Historical Commission adopted these trails as their Heritage Trail Program.

The Texas Independence Trail, as the name would suggest, follows the locations of the historical events leading up to Texas Independence.

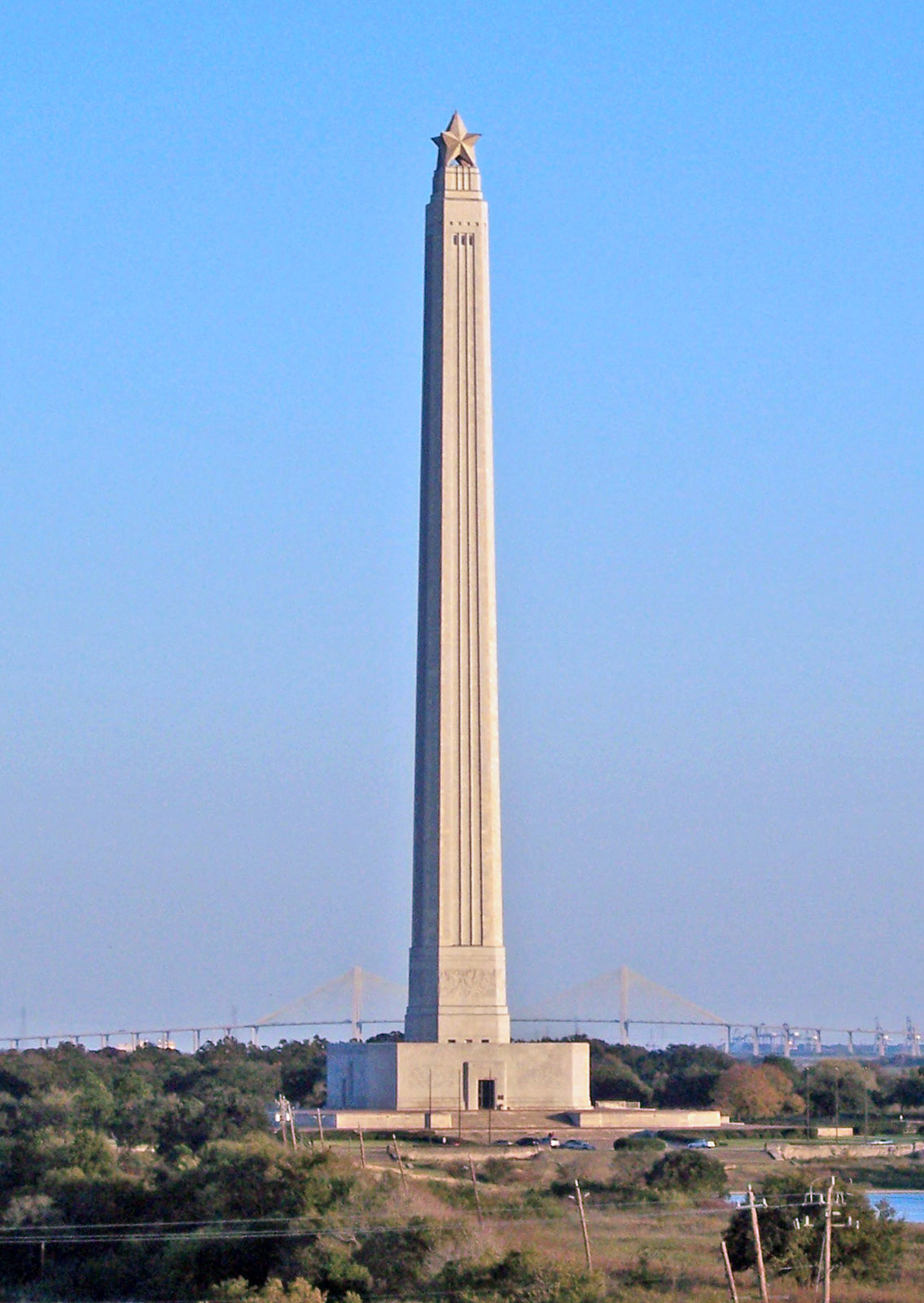
San Jacinto Monument

== Texas Independence Locations ==
- San Felipe, Texas
- Gonzales, Texas
- Washington-on-the-Brazos
- Alamo Mission in San Antonio
- Goliad, Texas
- San Jacinto Monument

== See also ==
- Texas Heritage Trails Program
