= Surfside Beach, Texas =

City in Brazoria County, Texas, United States

- City
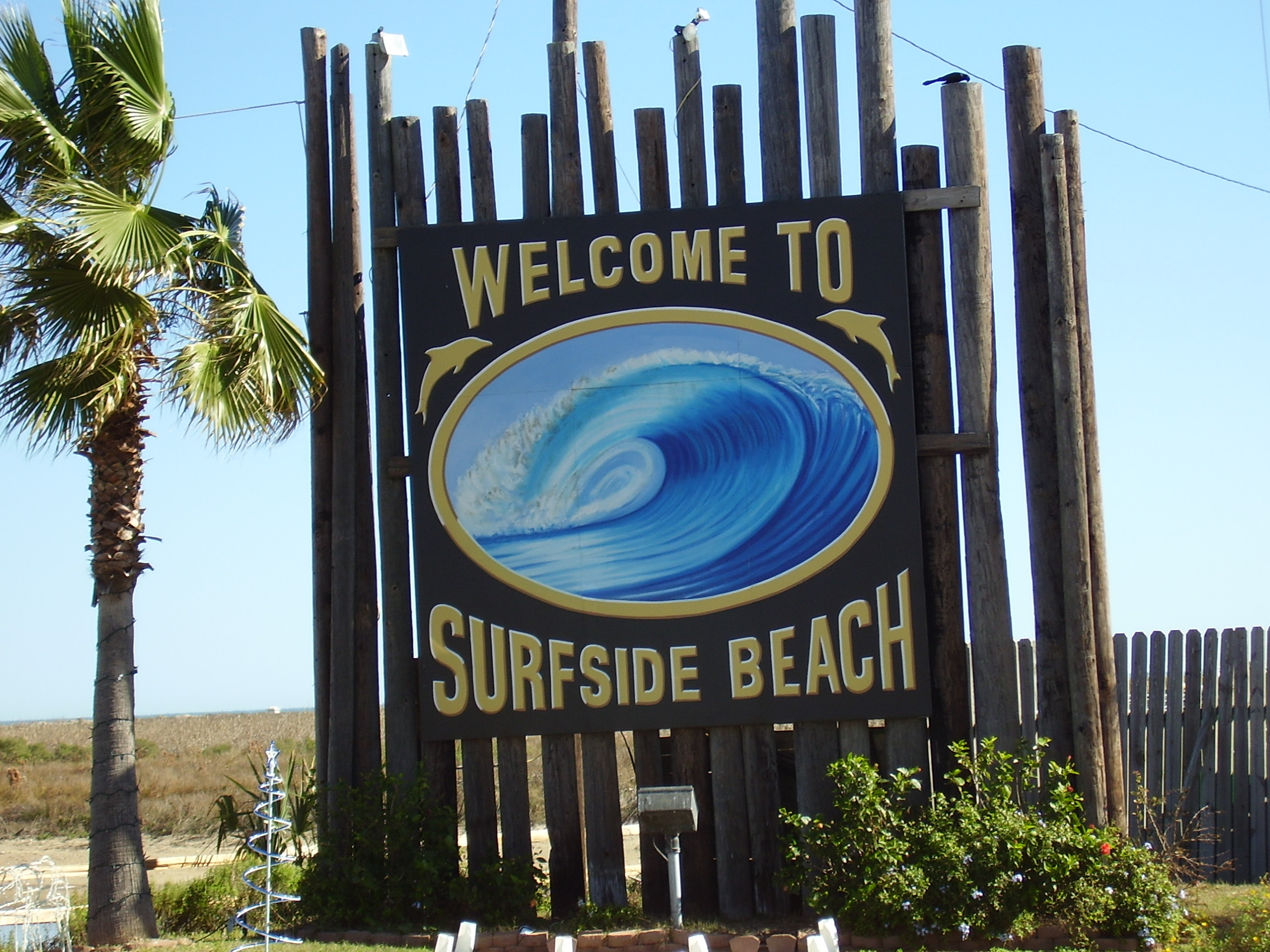
- The entrance sign to Surfside Beach
- Motto: "Island Life, Texas Style"
- Location of Surfside Beach, Texas
- Coordinates: 28°57′8″N 95°17′4″W
- Country: United States
- State: Texas
- County: Brazoria

Area
  - Total: 1.86 sq mi (4.83 km^{2})
  - Land: 1.59 sq mi (4.12 km^{2})
  - Water: 0.28 sq mi (0.72 km^{2})
- Elevation: 6.6 ft (2 m)

Population (2020)
  - Total: 640
  - Density: 364/sq mi (140.7/km^{2})
- Time zone: UTC-6 (Central (CST))
  - Summer (DST): UTC-5 (CDT)
- ZIP code: 77541
- Area code: 979
- FIPS code: 48-71384
- GNIS feature ID: 1369430
- Website: www.surfsidetx.org

Surfside Beach, also known locally as Surfside, is a city in Brazoria County, Texas, United States, that is situated on Follet's Island by the Gulf of Mexico near the city of Freeport. The population was 640 at the 2020 census. The city has claimed the "Cradle of Texas Liberty" title due to the fact that the Treaty of Velasco which ended hostilities between Texas and Mexico was signed at Fort Velasco, which was located near the city's current City Hall.

Former Congressman Ron Paul maintained a home near Surfside Beach before selling it on Facebook in 2011.

== Geography ==
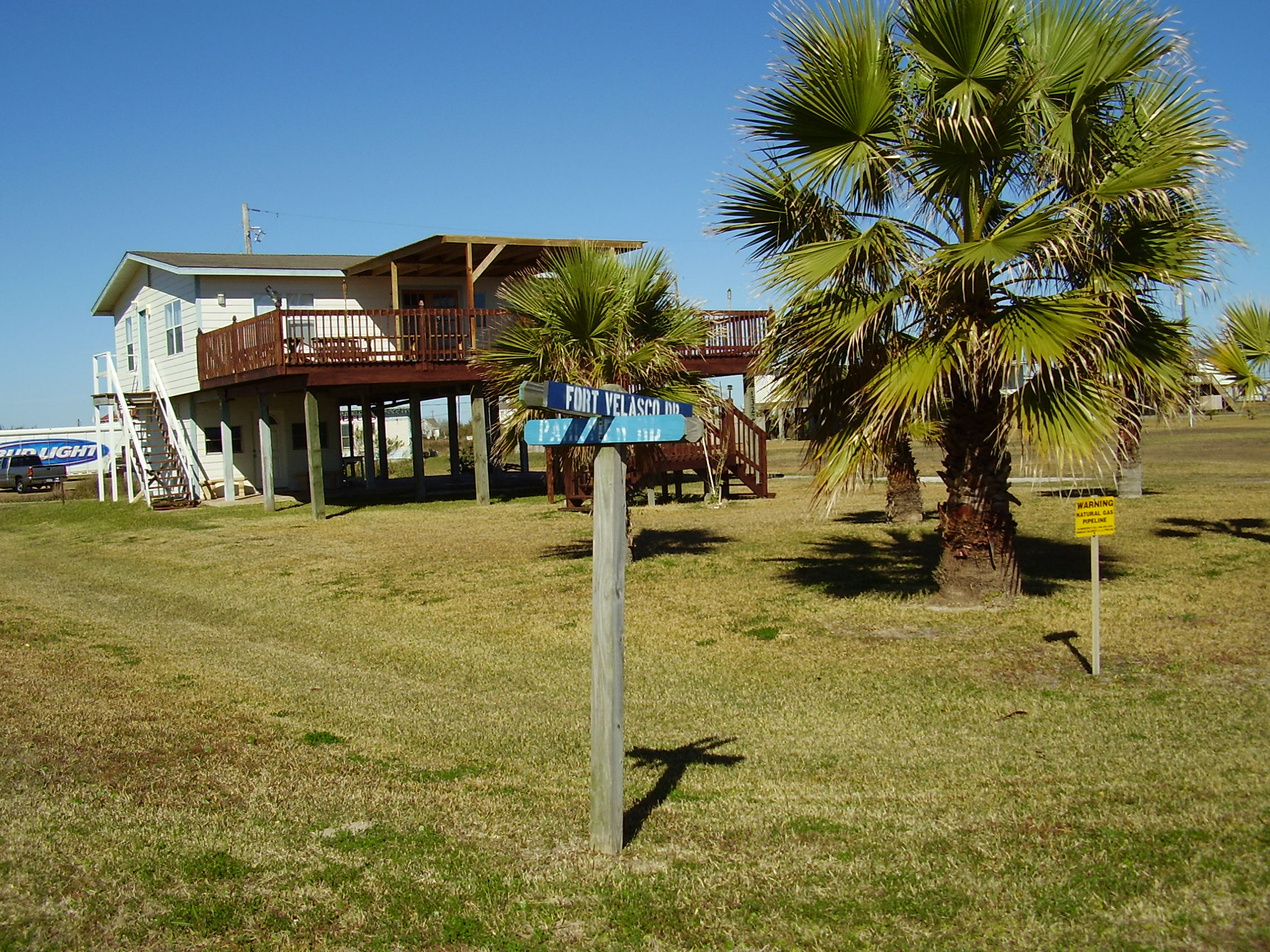
A Surfside Beach beach house and a street sign

Surfside Beach is located in southern Brazoria County on the southwestern tip of Follet's Island at 28°57′08″N 95°17′04″W. It is bordered to the southeast by the Gulf of Mexico and to the southwest by the entrance to Freeport Harbor, across which is the village of Quintana. The Intracoastal Waterway runs through the northwestern part of the city, forming the northwestern boundary in some places. The Bluewater Highway runs the length of Surfside Beach and continues northeast on Follet's Island 13 miles (21 km) to San Luis Pass and the bridge onto Galveston Island. Texas State Highway 332 begins in Surfside Beach and leads northwest past Freeport 12 miles (19 km) to Lake Jackson.

According to the United States Census Bureau, Surfside Beach has a total area of 2.2 square miles (5.8 km^{2}), of which 1.7 square miles (4.3 km^{2}) is land and 0.58 square miles (1.5 km^{2}), or 25.23%, is water. census 2011

== Demographics ==
Historical population
Census	Pop.	Note	%±
1980	577		—
1990	611		5.9%
2000	763		24.9%
2010	482		−36.8%
2020	640		32.8%
U.S. Decennial Census

=== 2020 census ===
As of the 2020 census, Surfside Beach had a population of 640, 338 households, and 156 families residing in the city.

The median age was 57.9 years, with 9.2% of residents under the age of 18 and 29.1% 65 years of age or older; for every 100 females there were 103.8 males, and for every 100 females age 18 and over there were 106.8 males age 18 and over.

0.0% of residents lived in urban areas, while 100.0% lived in rural areas.

There were 338 households in Surfside Beach, of which 13.3% had children under the age of 18 living in them. Of all households, 44.1% were married-couple households, 24.3% were households with a male householder and no spouse or partner present, and 25.1% were households with a female householder and no spouse or partner present. About 35.8% of all households were made up of individuals and 14.2% had someone living alone who was 65 years of age or older.

There were 1,044 housing units, of which 67.6% were vacant. The homeowner vacancy rate was 8.0% and the rental vacancy rate was 67.4%.

Racial composition as of the 2020 census
Race	Number	Percent
White	537	83.9%
Black or African American	12	1.9%
American Indian and Alaska Native	3	0.5%
Asian	10	1.6%
Native Hawaiian and Other Pacific Islander	0	0.0%
Some other race	20	3.1%
Two or more races	58	9.1%
Hispanic or Latino (of any race)	57	8.9%

=== 2010 census ===
As of the 2010 census, 482 people, 259 households, and 113 families resided in the city. The population density was 427.7 inhabitants per square mile (165.1/km^{2}). There were 879 housing units at an average density of 287 per square mile (111/km^{2}). The racial makeup of the city was 93.8% White, 1.7% African American, 1.0% Native American, 1.0% Asian, 0.8% some other race, and 0.8% from two or more races. Hispanics or Latinos of any race were 6.6% of the population.

Of the 259 households, 15.4% had children under the age of 18 living with them, 33.2% were headed by married couples living together, 7.3% had a female householder with no husband present, and 56.4% were not families. About 42.5% of all households were made up of individuals, and 10.8% were someone living alone who was 65 years of age or older. The average household size was 1.86, and the average family size was 2.50.

In the city, the population was distributed as 10.6% under the age of 18, 6.5% from 18 to 24, 17.6% from 25 to 44, 48.9% from 45 to 64, and 16.2% who were 65 years of age or older. The median age was 50.9 years. For every 100 females, there were 119.1 males. For every 100 females age 18 and over, there were 122.2 males.

For the period 2008–2012, the estimated median annual income for a household in the city was $42,656, and for a family was $62,917. Male full-time workers had a median income of $42,692 versus $27,132 for females. The per capita income for the city was $26,328. The population sample was too small for poverty figures to be calculated.

== Education ==
The city is served by Brazosport Independent School District (BISD).

- Freeport Elementary School (Pre-Kindergarten to grade 1)
- Velasco Elementary School (grades 2–4)
- Lanier Middle School (5–6)
- Freeport Intermediate School (7–8)
- Brazosport High School (9–12)

It was previously zoned to O.A. Fleming Elementary School (Pre-K–1), and Jane Long Elementary School (grades 2–4). Jane Long was scheduled to close in 2017, with Fleming taking grades K–1 and Velasco Elementary taking over grades 2–4. Fleming was scheduled to close when the new Freeport Elementary School opened in 2018.

The city is also served by Brazosport College. The Texas Legislature designated the Brazosport ISD as in the Brazosport College zone.

The city is served by the Brazoria County Library System.

== Gallery ==
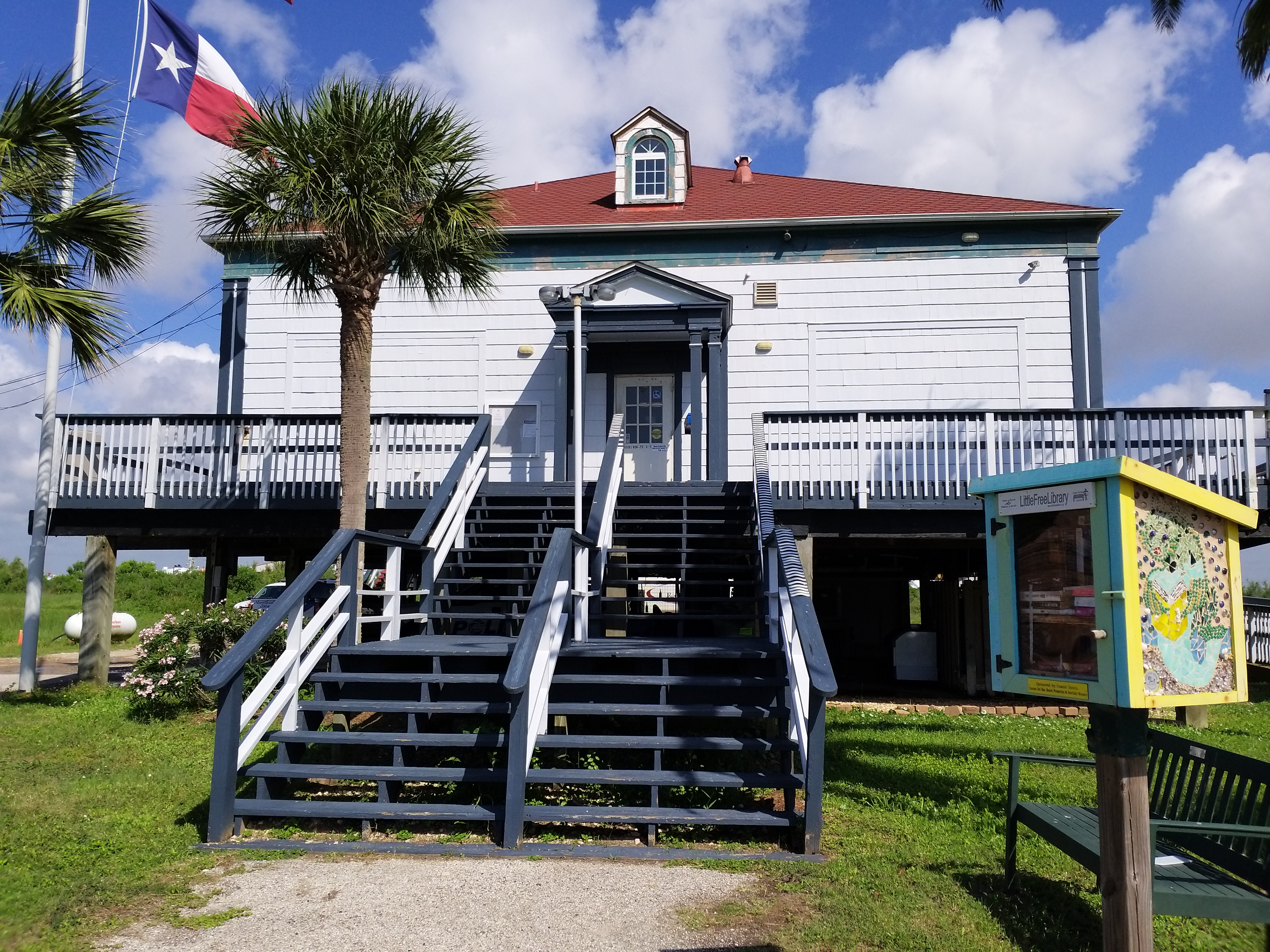
City hall

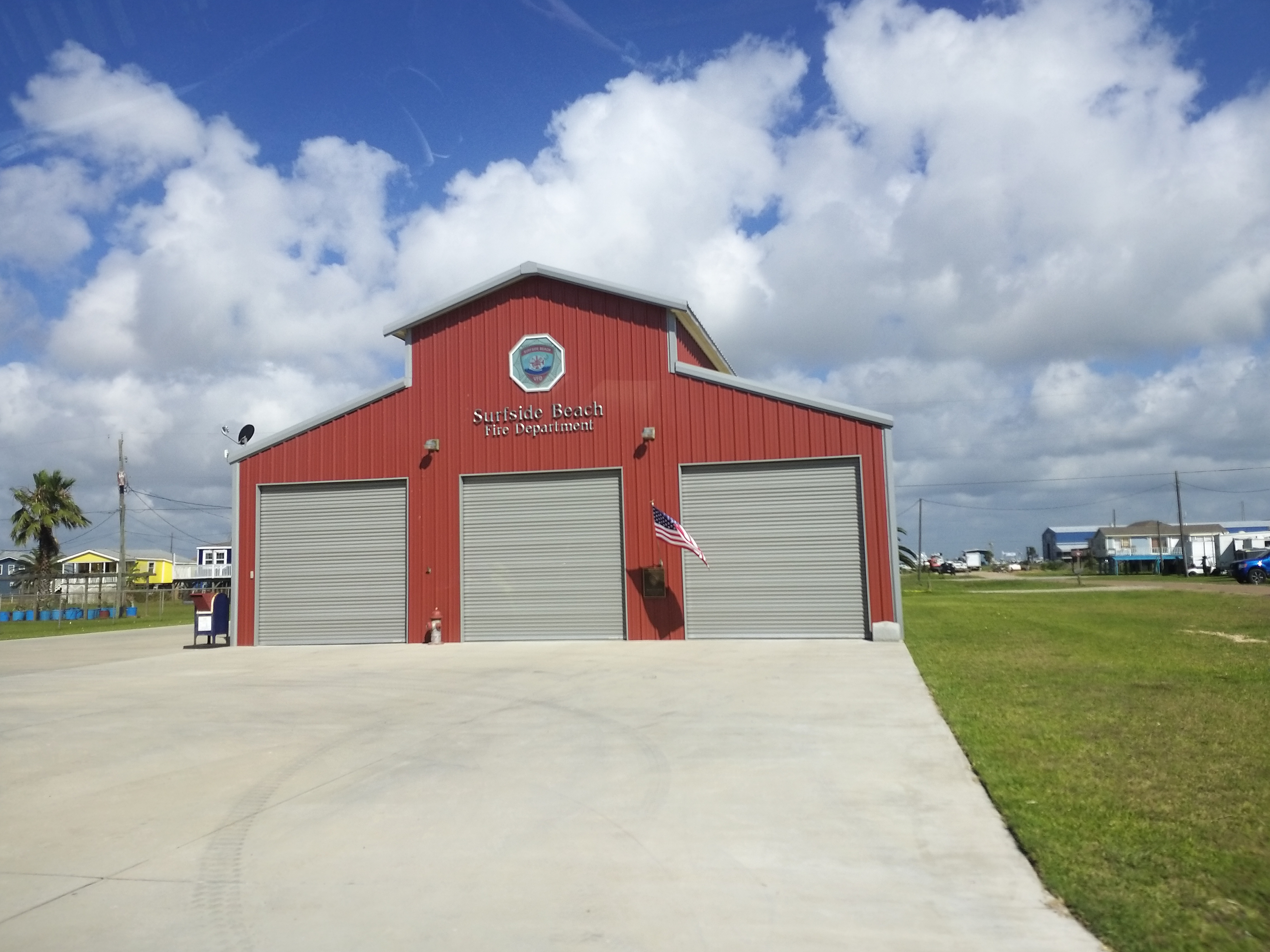
Fire station

== See also ==
- List of municipalities in Texas
