= Louise Jones =

Louise Jones may refer to:

- Louise Jones (cyclist), champion cyclist and UCI commisaire
- Louise U. Jones, state legislator in Colorado
- Louise Jones (athlete) (born 1985), New Zealand sprinter
- Louise Simonson, comic book writer known as Louise Jones when she was married to Jeff Jones
- Louise Jones, editor of Eerie
- Louise Jones, inspiration for Slide Away (Oasis song)
- Louise Jones (artist), Chinese-American mural artist
- Louise Sandher-Jones, British Member of Parliament (née Jones)

== See also ==
- Lou Jones (disambiguation)
- Lois Jones (disambiguation)
