= Lois Jones =

Lois Jones may refer to:

- Lois Mailou Jones (1905–1998), American artist
- Lois Jones (scientist) (1935–2000), American Antarctic scientist

== See also ==
- Lewis Jones (disambiguation)
- Louise Jones (disambiguation)
- Louis Jones (disambiguation)
