= Nana Miriam =

Nana Miriam is a mythical female heroine character in legends of the Sorko river-hunters, related to the Zarma people and known for being among the first people to settle in the river-banks in the region of Gao in the Songhai Empire. The main story associated with Nana Miriam is how she used her wits and magic to defeat a giant hippopotamus threatening the river settlements. According to different versions her father was Fara Makan or Owadia. The earliest translation of the story in English is the version recorded by Leo Frobenius, The American musicologist Maud Cuney Hare noted a "Song of Nana Miriam" in 1936.
