= Louis Jones =

Louis or Lou Jones may refer to:

- Lou Jones (athlete) (1932–2006), American athlete
- Louis B. Jones, American author and screenwriter
- Louis C. Jones (1908–1990), American folklorist
- Louis Clayton Jones (1935–2006), African American international attorney and civil rights leader
- Louis R. Jones (1895–1973), Marine Corps major general during World War II
- Lou Jones (rugby league) (1884–1924), Australian international rugby league footballer who played in the 1900s and 1910s
- Lou Jones (photographer) (born 1945), American photographer
- Louis (Blues Boy) Jones (1931–1984), American R&B singer
- Louis Jones Jr., convicted murderer
- Louis Jones (footballer) (born 1998), English football goalkeeper
- Grandpa Jones (Louis Marshall Jones, 1913–1998), American musician

== See also ==
- Lewis Jones (disambiguation)
- Louise Jones (disambiguation)
- Lois Jones (disambiguation)
- Lovana Jones (1938–2006), American politician
