= 1944 United States presidential election in Mississippi =

- November 7, 1944

All 9 Mississippi votes to the Electoral College

Nominee	Franklin D. Roosevelt	Thomas E. Dewey
Party	Democratic	Republican
Home state	New York	New York
Running mate	Harry S. Truman	John W. Bricker
Electoral vote	9	0
Popular vote	158,515	11,601
Percentage	88.02%	6.44%
County results
Roosevelt
60–70%
70–80%
80–90%
90–100%
President before election
Franklin D. Roosevelt
Democratic
Elected President
Franklin D. Roosevelt
Democratic

The 1944 United States presidential election in Mississippi took place on November 7, 1944, as part of the 1944 United States presidential election. Mississippi voters chose nine representatives, or electors, to the Electoral College, who voted for president and vice president.

Ever since the end of Reconstruction, Mississippi had been a one-party state dominated by the Democratic Party. The Republican Party was virtually nonexistent as a result of disenfranchisement among African Americans and poor whites, including voter intimidation against those who refused to vote Democratic.

From the time of Henry A. Wallace's appointment as vice-president and the 1943 Detroit race riots, however, the northern left wing of the Democratic Party became committed to restoring black political rights, a policy vehemently opposed by all Southern Democrats as an infringement upon "states' rights". Anger with the FDR administration intensified further when the Supreme Court ruled in Smith v. Allwright that the white primaries upon which the politics of Mississippi and most other Southern states (Note: Virginia, North Carolina, Tennessee and Oklahoma lacked statewide white primaries due to significant Republican opposition from Appalachia or the Cherokee Outlet region, although some counties in these states did use the white primary.) were based violated the Fourteenth and Fifteenth Amendments.

Consequently, Mississippi Democrats, already developing opposition to the New Deal, which had provided substantial work for white Mississippians during the 1930s, were very concerned about Roosevelt being renominated for a fourth term. In fact, the original slate of Democratic electors was pledged to vote for a candidate other than Roosevelt. However, FDR remained extremely popular with the majority of Mississippians, even those wealthy enough to pay the state's poll tax. Consequently, Governor Thomas L. Bailey was forced to call the state legislature, which replaced the convention-nominated Democratic electors with electors pledged to vote for FDR. 4 electors nominated by the state Democratic convention pledged themselves to vote for FDR and were included on the Democratic ticket. On the other hand, 5 electors nominated by the state Democratic convention chose to not pledge themselves to FDR and were put on a separate ticket altogether.

Mississippi was won by incumbent President Franklin D. Roosevelt (D–New York), running with Senator Harry S. Truman, with 88.02 percent of the popular vote, against Governor Thomas E. Dewey (R–New York), running with Governor John Bricker, with 6.44 percent of the popular vote, making it Roosevelt's strongest state in the election.

As of 2024, this marks the last time that Forrest County has voted for a Democratic presidential candidate. It was also the last time until 1972 that Mississippi would back the national winner in a presidential election. This was the last election in which every county voted for the Democrats in Mississippi. The next election would also see all the state's counties go to just one party, albeit to the Dixiecrats rather than the Democrats. (Note: Dixiecrat nominees Strom Thurmond and Fielding L. Wright would be listed as “Democratic” on the Mississippi ballot, as they would also in Alabama where national Democratic nominee Truman would not be on the ballot at all.) The same would be true of 1964, when all the state's counties went entirely to the Republican Party.

As Roosevelt's strongest state, this is the most recent time Mississippi has voted more Democratic than Georgia.

== Results ==
General election results
Party	Pledged to	Elector	Votes
Democratic Party (Legislature)	Franklin D. Roosevelt	Walter S. Welch	158,515
Democratic Party (Legislature)	Franklin D. Roosevelt	John Backstrom	158,207
Democratic Party (Legislature)	Franklin D. Roosevelt	Curtis M. Swango	158,015
Democratic Party (Legislature)	Franklin D. Roosevelt	R. C. Russell	157,883
Democratic Party (Legislature)	Franklin D. Roosevelt	Susie V. Powell	150,829
Democratic Party (Legislature)	Franklin D. Roosevelt	Hugh V. Wall	150,403
Democratic Party (Legislature)	Franklin D. Roosevelt	J. B. Snider	150,355
Democratic Party (Legislature)	Franklin D. Roosevelt	J. P. Coleman	150,337
Democratic Party (Legislature)	Franklin D. Roosevelt	Guy Mitchell, Sr.	149,348
Democratic Party (Convention)	Unpledged	Clarence E. Morgan	9,964
Democratic Party (Convention)	Unpledged	Frank E. Everett	9,586
Democratic Party (Convention)	Unpledged	W. G. McLain	9,525
Democratic Party (Convention)	Unpledged	J. B. Perry, Jr.	9,103
Democratic Party (Convention)	Unpledged	T. J. Tubb	8,182
Independent Republican Party	Thomas E. Dewey	George L. Sheldon	7,859
Independent Republican Party	Thomas E. Dewey	Nelson E. Taylor	7,709
Independent Republican Party	Thomas E. Dewey	M. H. White	7,536
Independent Republican Party	Thomas E. Dewey	John R. Thrasher	7,472
Independent Republican Party	Thomas E. Dewey	Ralph Haxton	7,230
Independent Republican Party	Thomas E. Dewey	J. A. Bratton	6,723
Independent Republican Party	Thomas E. Dewey	John R. Tally	6,704
Independent Republican Party	Thomas E. Dewey	Louise Baugh	6,596
Independent Republican Party	Thomas E. Dewey	John G. Carr	6,525
Republican Party	Thomas E. Dewey	T. C. Moore	3,742
Republican Party	Thomas E. Dewey	Fred W. Hale	3,728
Republican Party	Thomas E. Dewey	J. L. Taylor	3,707
Republican Party	Thomas E. Dewey	Monroe Smith	3,584
Republican Party	Thomas E. Dewey	J. H. Gearhart	3,571
Republican Party	Thomas E. Dewey	Jasper Boykin	3,552
Republican Party	Thomas E. Dewey	F. M. O'Shea	3,540
Republican Party	Thomas E. Dewey	Walter Gearhart	3,536
Republican Party	Thomas E. Dewey	R. A. Whelan	3,530
Total votes			180,080

=== Results by county ===
Counties	Franklin Delano Roosevelt Democratic		Thomas E. Dewey Republican		Unpledged electors Southern Democratic		Margin		Total votes cast
Counties	#	%	#	%	#	%	#	%	#
Adams	1,431	74.53%	282	14.69%	207	10.78%	1,149	59.84%	1,920
Alcorn	2,569	89.36%	206	7.17%	100	3.48%	2,363	82.19%	2,875
Amite	1,348	89.09%	87	5.75%	78	5.16%	1,261	83.34%	1,513
Attala	1,990	87.51%	87	3.83%	197	8.66%	1,793	78.85%	2,274
Benton	800	89.49%	42	4.70%	52	5.82%	748	83.67%	894
Bolivar	2,119	75.09%	378	13.39%	325	11.52%	1,741	61.69%	2,822
Calhoun	2,006	92.49%	97	4.47%	66	3.04%	1,909	88.01%	2,169
Carroll	1,360	90.31%	68	4.52%	78	5.18%	1,282	85.13%	1,506
Chickasaw	1,762	83.31%	180	8.51%	173	8.18%	1,582	74.80%	2,115
Choctaw	1,066	89.21%	76	6.36%	53	4.44%	990	82.85%	1,195
Claiborne	667	88.34%	45	5.96%	43	5.70%	622	82.38%	755
Clarke	1,605	89.71%	95	5.31%	89	4.97%	1,510	84.40%	1,789
Clay	956	75.45%	109	8.60%	202	15.94%	754	59.51%	1,267
Coahoma	2,234	86.49%	191	7.39%	158	6.12%	2,043	79.09%	2,583
Copiah	2,320	93.02%	85	3.41%	89	3.57%	2,231	89.45%	2,494
Covington	1,615	93.35%	58	3.35%	57	3.29%	1,557	90.00%	1,730
DeSoto	1,469	87.23%	123	7.30%	92	5.46%	1,346	79.93%	1,684
Forrest	3,394	83.08%	436	10.67%	255	6.24%	2,958	72.41%	4,085
Franklin	1,137	90.24%	49	3.89%	74	5.87%	1,063	84.37%	1,260
George	1,025	89.68%	92	8.05%	26	2.27%	933	81.63%	1,143
Greene	879	86.52%	109	10.73%	28	2.76%	770	75.79%	1,016
Grenada	1,239	83.15%	117	7.85%	134	8.99%	1,105	74.16%	1,490
Hancock	1,536	86.34%	137	7.70%	106	5.96%	1,399	78.64%	1,779
Harrison	5,458	82.72%	622	9.43%	518	7.85%	4,836	73.29%	6,598
Hinds	9,575	83.79%	962	8.42%	891	7.80%	8,613	75.37%	11,428
Holmes	1,796	86.51%	122	5.88%	158	7.61%	1,638	78.90%	2,076
Humphreys	1,103	93.08%	35	2.95%	47	3.97%	1,056	89.11%	1,185
Issaquena	206	93.64%	5	2.27%	9	4.09%	197	89.55%	220
Itawamba	1,287	83.95%	183	11.94%	63	4.11%	1,104	72.02%	1,533
Jackson	2,496	87.61%	213	7.48%	140	4.91%	2,283	80.13%	2,849
Jasper	1,610	93.93%	47	2.74%	57	3.33%	1,553	90.61%	1,714
Jefferson	681	86.09%	25	3.16%	85	10.75%	596	75.35%	791
Jefferson Davis	1,305	89.38%	88	6.03%	67	4.59%	1,217	83.36%	1,460
Jones	4,563	89.14%	337	6.58%	219	4.28%	4,226	82.56%	5,119
Kemper	1,309	94.72%	37	2.68%	36	2.60%	1,272	92.04%	1,382
Lafayette	2,041	91.32%	87	3.89%	107	4.79%	1,934	86.53%	2,235
Lamar	1,043	90.07%	93	8.03%	22	1.90%	950	82.04%	1,158
Lauderdale	5,653	88.12%	379	5.91%	383	5.97%	5,270	82.15%	6,415
Lawrence	1,456	92.15%	45	2.85%	79	5.00%	1,377	87.15%	1,580
Leake	2,736	96.88%	24	0.85%	64	2.27%	2,672	94.62%	2,824
Lee	3,279	87.70%	230	6.15%	230	6.15%	3,049	81.55%	3,739
Leflore	2,200	84.65%	200	7.70%	199	7.66%	2,000	76.95%	2,599
Lincoln	2,380	93.41%	103	4.04%	65	2.55%	2,277	89.36%	2,548
Lowndes	1,969	76.44%	360	13.98%	247	9.59%	1,609	62.46%	2,576
Madison	1,805	89.14%	104	5.14%	116	5.73%	1,689	83.41%	2,025
Marion	2,415	96.79%	54	2.16%	26	1.04%	2,361	94.63%	2,495
Marshall	1,349	89.69%	63	4.19%	92	6.12%	1,257	83.58%	1,504
Monroe	2,927	89.70%	159	4.87%	177	5.42%	2,750	84.28%	3,263
Montgomery	1,286	89.00%	74	5.12%	85	5.88%	1,201	83.11%	1,445
Neshoba	2,869	90.91%	131	4.15%	156	4.94%	2,713	85.96%	3,156
Newton	2,448	95.18%	56	2.18%	68	2.64%	2,380	92.53%	2,572
Noxubee	934	85.14%	103	9.39%	60	5.47%	831	75.75%	1,097
Oktibbeha	1,821	88.48%	110	5.34%	127	6.17%	1,694	82.31%	2,058
Panola	1,798	88.97%	90	4.45%	133	6.58%	1,665	82.38%	2,021
Pearl River	2,093	94.49%	84	3.79%	38	1.72%	2,009	90.70%	2,215
Perry	775	92.26%	44	5.24%	21	2.50%	731	87.02%	840
Pike	2,738	85.03%	248	7.70%	234	7.27%	2,490	77.33%	3,220
Pontotoc	1,647	91.35%	87	4.83%	69	3.83%	1,560	86.52%	1,803
Prentiss	1,585	86.75%	175	9.58%	67	3.67%	1,410	77.18%	1,827
Quitman	1,001	85.92%	59	5.06%	105	9.01%	896	76.91%	1,165
Rankin	2,331	94.30%	98	3.96%	43	1.74%	2,233	90.33%	2,472
Scott	2,105	94.61%	60	2.70%	60	2.70%	2,045	91.91%	2,225
Sharkey	666	92.24%	24	3.32%	32	4.43%	634	87.81%	722
Simpson	2,403	94.31%	78	3.06%	67	2.63%	2,325	91.25%	2,548
Smith	2,432	92.79%	165	6.30%	24	0.92%	2,267	86.49%	2,621
Stone	972	94.19%	43	4.17%	17	1.65%	929	90.02%	1,032
Sunflower	2,546	86.19%	155	5.25%	253	8.56%	2,293	77.62%	2,954
Tallahatchie	2,377	97.38%	40	1.64%	24	0.98%	2,337	95.74%	2,441
Tate	1,405	94.68%	29	1.95%	50	3.37%	1,355	91.31%	1,484
Tippah	2,439	91.52%	126	4.73%	100	3.75%	2,313	86.79%	2,665
Tishomingo	1,366	79.98%	296	17.33%	46	2.69%	1,070	62.65%	1,708
Tunica	649	85.85%	35	4.63%	72	9.52%	577	76.32%	756
Union	2,054	88.42%	183	7.88%	86	3.70%	1,871	80.54%	2,323
Walthall	1,170	90.14%	68	5.24%	60	4.62%	1,102	84.90%	1,298
Warren	3,018	86.08%	304	8.67%	184	5.25%	2,714	77.41%	3,506
Washington	1,535	62.25%	454	18.41%	477	19.34%	1,058	42.90%	2,466
Wayne	1,302	92.01%	35	2.47%	78	5.51%	1,224	86.50%	1,415
Webster	1,468	90.01%	127	7.79%	36	2.21%	1,341	82.22%	1,631
Wilkinson	773	81.97%	80	8.48%	90	9.54%	683	72.43%	943
Winston	1,757	93.81%	51	2.72%	65	3.47%	1,692	90.34%	1,873
Yalobusha	1,525	90.83%	97	5.78%	57	3.39%	1,428	85.05%	1,679
Yazoo	2,200	92.48%	78	3.28%	101	4.25%	2,099	88.23%	2,379
Totals	158,515	88.02%	11,601	6.44%	9,964	5.53%	146,914	81.58%	180,080
