= David G. Burnet =

Texian politician (1788–1870)

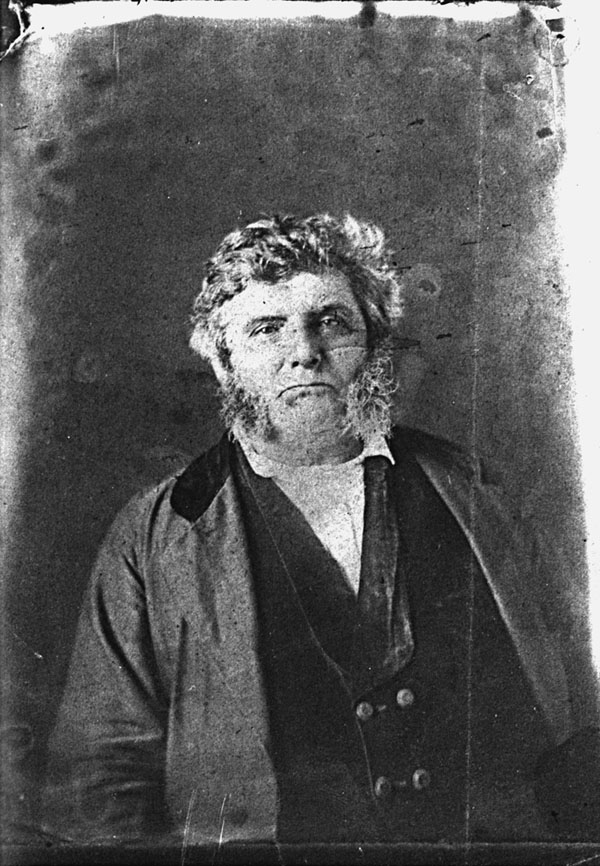
- David G. Burnet

President of the Republic of Texas Interim
- In office March 17, 1836 – October 22, 1836
- Vice President: Lorenzo de Zavala
- Preceded by: Office established De facto: James Long as President of the Republic of Texas (1819)
- Succeeded by: Sam Houston

2nd Vice President of the Republic of Texas
- In office December 31, 1838 – December 13, 1841
- President: Mirabeau B. Lamar
- Preceded by: Mirabeau B. Lamar
- Succeeded by: Edward Burleson

Secretary of State of Texas
- In office May 4, 1846 – January 1, 1848
- Preceded by: Charles Mariner
- Succeeded by: Washington D. Miller

Personal details
- Born: David Gouverneur Burnet; April 14, 1788 Newark, New Jersey, U.S.
- Died: December 5, 1870 (aged 82) Galveston, Texas, U.S.
- Resting place: Lakeview Cemetery, Galveston
- Spouse: Hannah Este

David Gouverneur Burnet (April 14, 1788 – December 5, 1870) was an early politician within the Republic of Texas, serving as the interim president of Texas in 1836, the second vice president of the Republic of Texas (1839–1841), and the secretary of state (1846) for the new state of Texas after it was annexed to the United States. Burnet was born in Newark, New Jersey, and attended law school in Cincinnati, Ohio. As a young man, he lived with a Comanche tribe for two years before he returned to Ohio.

In 1806, Burnet volunteered to serve the unsuccessful filibustering expeditions led by General Francisco de Miranda for the independence of Venezuela from Spain. He fought in Chile in 1807 and in Venezuela in 1808. After Miranda broke with Simon Bolivar, Burnet returned to the United States in 1812. In 1826, he moved to Stephen F. Austin's colony in Mexican Texas. He received a land grant as an empresario but was forced to sell the land after he had failed to attract enough settlers to his colony, and he later lost his right to operate a sawmill after he refused to convert to Roman Catholicism.

On hearing of William B. Travis's plea for help at the Alamo, Burnet traveled to Washington-on-the-Brazos to recruit help from the Convention of 1836. He remained at the convention and was elected interim president on March 17, 1836. On his orders, the government fled Washington-on-the-Brazos for Harrisburg, thus inspiring the Runaway Scrape. Burnet narrowly avoided capture by Mexican troops the following month. After Sam Houston's victory at the Battle of San Jacinto, Burnet took custody of Mexican General Antonio López de Santa Anna and negotiated the Treaties of Velasco. Many Texans were infuriated that the treaty allowed Santa Anna to escape execution, and some called for Burnet's arrest for treason.

Burnet declined to run for president and resigned as interim president on October 22, 1836. He served as vice president under Mirabeau B. Lamar and participated in the Battle of Neches. He was defeated by Houston in the next presidential election. Burnet served as the state's first Secretary of State when the United States annexed Texas. The first Reconstruction state legislature appointed him to the United States Senate. Still, he could not take his seat because of the Ironclad oath.

== Early life and career ==
Coat of Arms of David G. Burnet

Burnet was born to Dr. William Burnet and his second wife, Gertrude Gouverneur Rutgers, widow of Anthony Rutgers (a brother of Henry Rutgers who founded Rutgers University). His father had served in the Continental Congress. David Burnet was orphaned as a child.

In 1805, Burnet became a clerk for a New York counting house, Robinson and Hartshorne. When the firm suffered financial difficulty, Burnet gave his entire personal inheritance, $1,300 (equivalent to $28,000 in 2025), to try to save the company. The firm went bankrupt, and Burnet lost all of the money.

In 1806, Burnet volunteered to serve the unsuccessful filibustering expeditions led by general Francisco de Miranda for the independence of Venezuela from Spain rule. He fought in Chile in 1807 and in Venezuela in 1808. After Miranda broke with Simon Bolivar, Burnet returned to the United States in 1812.

Upon his return Burnet moved to Cincinnati, Ohio, to study law. He lived with his two older brothers, Jacob, who later became a US Senator, and Isaac, who later served as mayor of Cincinnati.

== Early Texas years ==
In 1817, Burnet moved to Natchitoches, Louisiana and set up a mercantile business. After several months, he developed a bloody cough. A doctor diagnosed him with tuberculosis and suggested he move to Texas, then a part of Mexico to recuperate in the dry air. Later that year, Burnet traveled alone into Texas. A Comanche tribe came to his aid when he fell off of his horse by the Colorado River, and he lived with them for two years until he made a full recovery. Near the end of the year, he met Ben Milam, who had come to the village to trade with the tribe.

His cough improved, and Burnet returned to Cincinnati. He asked that the Mexican prisoners be released with him and allowed to return home. The Comanches agreed to this proposal, and the Mexican families were surprised that there was no ransom or other agreement to the release of these prisoners.

In Cincinnati, Burnet wrote a series of articles for the Literary Gazette detailing his time with the Native Americans. He practiced law for several years but returned to Texas after hearing of Stephen F. Austin's thriving colony for Anglos. Burnet settled in San Felipe, the headquarters of Austin's colony, in 1826. For the next 18 months, he provided law advice to the 200 settlers in the town and organized the first Presbyterian Sunday School in Texas. A profoundly religious man, Burnet neither drank nor swore and always carried a Bible in his pocket.

== Texas empresario ==
After a failed venture with Milam, the Western Colonization and Mining Company, in 1827, Burnet traveled with Lorenzo de Zavala and Joseph Vehlein to the Coahuila y Tejas state capitol, Saltillo. The men applied for grants as empresarios under the General Colonization Law of 1824. Burnet received authorization to settle 300 families in East Texas, northwest of Nacogdoches, an area that had already been settled by the Cherokee. Under the terms of his grant, a married settler could purchase a league of land 4,428 acres (20 km^{2})) for $200.

Burnet returned to Ohio to recruit settlers but could not entice the required number of families. In 1828, he sold his land grant to the Galveston Bay and Texas Land Company for $12,000. Burnet remained in the United States for several years, and on December 8, 1830, married Hannah Este of Morristown, New Jersey. At their wedding, he was 43, and she was 30 years old.

Eager to return to Texas, Burnet and his new wife chartered the ship Call and brought a steam engine to operate a sawmill. A storm grounded the ship along Bolivar Point, and, to lighten the load, they were forced to discard all of Hannah's furniture and her hope chest. The steam engine was the only piece of cargo that could be saved.

Burnet established his sawmill on 17 acres (10 ha) of land along the San Jacinto River, in an area that came to be known as Burnet's Bay. Under Mexican law, Burnet was entitled to an extra land grant because his sawmill provided a needed public service. However, the law required settlers to convert to Roman Catholicism to receive the extra land grant. The devout Burnet refused, angering the Mexican authorities to the point that they canceled his grant for operating the sawmill. The mill was finally sold to Dr. Branch T. Archer at a large loss.

== Early public service ==
Burnet was a delegate to the Convention of 1833, where he was elected the chair of a committee that created a petition arguing that the Mexican Congress approve separate statehood for Texas. Stephen F. Austin carried the petition to Mexico City and was promptly jailed.

Shortly after the Convention of 1833 disbanded, Antonio López de Santa Anna became Mexico's new president. Over the next two years, Santa Anna began consolidating his political control over the country by dissolving the Mexican Congress and disbanding state legislatures. In October 1835, Santa Anna declared himself military dictator and marched north to "reassert control over Texas".

During this time, Burnet had been appointed the first judge of the Austin district and organized a court at San Felipe. From then on, he was known as Judge Burnet. He and other Texians determined that Texas should be an independent state within Mexico. In November 1835, the Consultation of 1835 was held at San Felipe. At the consultation, Burnet formed a provisional state government based on the 1824 Constitution of Mexico, which Santa Anna had already repudiated.

== Republic of Texas ==
=== Birth ===
On March 1, 1836, a constitutional convention, the Convention of 1836, was held at Washington-on-the-Brazos. Burnet was not chosen as a delegate to the convention. On hearing of William B. Travis's plea for help at the Alamo, Burnet immediately set out to offer his assistance. He stopped at the convention to try to recruit others to join the fight but soon became so "inspired by their deliberations" that he remained as a visitor. Speaking privately with many of the delegates, Burnet professed that he would be willing to serve as president of a new republic, even if that made him a target of Santa Anna.

After hearing of the fall of the Alamo, the chairman of the convention, Richard Ellis, wanted to adjourn the convention and begin again in Nacogdoches. Burnet leaped onto a bench and made a speech asking the delegates to stay and finish their business. They did so, and the new constitution was adopted that evening. The frontrunners for the presidency of the new country, Austin, Sam Houston, and William H. Wharton, were absent from the convention. So the nominees became Burnet and Samuel Price Carson. Burnet won, on a vote of 29–23, in the early hours of March 17, becoming the interim president of the new Republic of Texas. De Zavala was elected vice president.

=== Interim presidency ===
==== Wartime ====
One of Burnet's first acts as president was to transfer the capital of the new state from Washington-on-the-Brazos to Harrisburg, which was located nearer to the small Texas Navy at Galveston Island. Harrisburg was also closer to the US border and would allow easier communication with US officials. The move became urgent when the convention received word that Santa Anna was within 60 miles (100 km) of Washington-on-the-Brazos. Burnet quickly adjourned the proceedings, and the government fled, inspiring a massive fight known as the Runaway Scrape. Burnet personally carried the Texas Declaration of Independence in his saddlebags.

Sam Houston, leading the Texan Army, also decided to strategically retreat from Gonzales after learning of the defeat at the Alamo. On hearing of the government's flight, "Houston was pained and annoyed" and maintained it was a cowardly action that had caused a great deal of unnecessary panic. Burnet was infuriated by Houston's criticism and accused Houston of staging a retreat because he was afraid to fight. Within several days, Burnet had stationed a spy, Major James H. Perry, on Houston's staff. To discredit Houston, Perry initiated a groundless rumor that Houston had begun taking opium.

On March 25, Burnet declared martial law and divided Texas into three military districts. All able-bodied men between 18 and 55 were ordered to report for military duty. Four days later, Burnet issued a proclamation declaring that a man would lose his Texas citizenship and any future claim to land if he left Texas, refused to fight, or helped the Mexican Army.

In the hopes of gaining assistance from the US, Burnet sent Carson, now his secretary of state, to Louisiana to approach General Edmund P. Gaines, who had been given orders by US President Andrew Jackson not to cross the Sabine River into Texas. A small amount of relief came on April 9; however, with the arrival of the "Twin Sisters," two 6 lb. cannons that had been sent as a gift from the people of Cincinnati to show their respect for the Burnet family since Burnet's brother Isaac was the mayor of Cincinnati. Burnet immediately sent the guns to Houston.

Out of safety concerns, the government was moved again on April 13 to Galveston. Santa Anna's army reached Harrisburg two days later to find a deserted town. On April 17, Burnet received word that the Mexican Army was headed for his location. He and his family crowded into a rowboat immediately, leaving their personal effects behind. When they reached 30 yards (30 m) offshore, Colonel Juan Almonte and a troop of Mexican cavalry rode into view. Burnet stood up in the rowboat so the army would focus on him instead of his family. Almonte ordered the troops not to fire, as he had seen Hannah Burnet in the boat and did not want to put her in danger.

==== Peacetime ====
Burnet did not hear of Houston's victory at San Jacinto and subsequent capture of Santa Anna until several days after. He hurried to the battlefield, where he often complained about Houston's use of profanity. Houston's staff "complained that the president grumbled ungraciously, was hard to please, and spent all of his time giving orders and collecting souvenirs." The two men also argued over the distribution of $18,000 in specie that had been found in Santa Anna's treasure chest. Burnet insisted that the money should go to the Texas treasury, but Houston had already given $3,000 to the Texas Navy and distributed the rest among his men.

In his distrust of civil government, Santa Anna requested that he be allowed to negotiate a treaty with Houston. His request was rejected, and Burnet took him into custody, first to Galveston Island and then to Velasco. On May 14, 1836, both men signed the Treaties of Velasco. In a public treaty, Santa Anna agreed to immediately cease all hostilities and withdraw his troops south of the Rio Grande. Burnet pledged that Santa Anna would have safe passage home. Secretly, the men agreed that Santa Anna would "use his influence with the Mexican government to secure the recognition of Texas Independence with its southern boundary as the Rio Grande." Mexico later repudiated the treaty.

The people of Texas were incensed at the terms of the treaty. The public, the Secretary of War, and the Secretary of the Navy wanted to see Santa Anna executed for his actions. Despite the criticism, Burnet arranged for Santa Anna to travel by boat to Mexico. His ship was delayed for several days by wind, and while it was docked, 250 volunteers, commanded by Thomas Green, arrived. Green demanded that Burnet resign immediately. The ship's captain, afraid for his safety, refused to set sail unless Green approved. With few other options, Burnet ordered Santa Anna brought ashore and imprisoned at Quintana. Many of the Texas army officers threatened to execute Santa Anna and to try Burnet for treason.

Most of Burnet's time was spent writing proclamations, orders, and letters appealing for funds and volunteers. The Texas treasury was empty as a taxation system had yet to be implemented. There was no money to pay Burnet a salary, and his family soon had trouble paying for their expenses. To make ends meet, they sold a Negro woman and boy. Filling the treasury would take more effort, and Burnet proposed to sell land scrip in New York State. The bids dropped as low as 1¢ per acre, so the plan was shelved.

With no money and little respect for Burnet, it was unsurprising that "no one followed orders, and the government struggled to direct the state effectively." Burnet wished to replace Thomas Jefferson Rusk as commander of the army and sent Secretary of War Mirabeau B. Lamar to take Rusk's place. Instead, Rusk proposed that General Felix Huston be named his replacement. Lamar called a vote of the men in the army, who overwhelmingly voted for Huston, essentially a vote of no confidence in Burnet's decisions.

==== Resignation ====
The first Texas presidential election was held on September 5, 1836. Burnet declined to run, and Houston was elected to become the first president. Houston was expected to take office in December. On October 3, Burnet called the first session of the Texas Congress to order in Columbia. Houston arrived at the session on October 9, and the Congress quickly began lobbying Burnet to resign so that Houston could begin his duties. Burnet finally agreed to resign on October 22, the day after de Zavala resigned as vice president.

During the transition of power, Burnet's son Jacob died at Velasco. The Burnets returned to their home, which had been looted, which left them with no furniture or other household articles. To support his family, Burnet practiced law and farmed.

=== Vice president ===
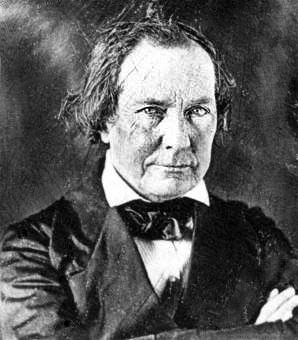
Burnet served as vice president under Mirabeau B. Lamar.

Houston's term as president expired in 1838. Burnet declined offers to run as his replacement but agreed to run as the vice president for his friend, Mirabeau B. Lamar. Once the election returns were in, Burnet and Houston engaged in a shouting match, with Burnet calling Houston a "half-Indian" and Houston calling Burnet a "hog thief." Burnet challenged Houston to a duel, but Houston refused: "The people are equally disgusted with both of us." Lamar and Burnet were inaugurated on December 10, 1838.

Burnet was an active vice president. In 1839, he briefly served as acting Secretary of State after Barnard Bee had been sent to Mexico. Burnet was part of a five-person commission to negotiate with Chief Bowl for the "peaceful" expulsion of the Cherokee tribe from their territory northwest of Nacogdoches. After a week of negotiations, the group did not agree.

On July 15, three regiments of Texas troops attacked the Cherokee at the Battle of Neches. Chief Bowl and a hundred other Indians were killed; the survivors retreated into Arkansas Territory. Burnet fought in the battle as a volunteer and suffered minor wounds.

In December 1840, Burnet became acting president when Lamar took a leave of absence to seek medical treatment in New Orleans for an intestinal disorder. His first official act, on December 16, was to deliver an address to Congress alleging that Mexican armies were preparing to invade Texas. Burnet wanted Congress to declare war on Mexico and to attempt to push the Texas southern boundary to the Sierra Madres. His proposal was defeated by supporters of Houston, who was then serving in the legislature.

=== Presidential candidate ===
Burnet dismissed several of Lamar's appointees during his time as acting president, angering the president. After Lamar's term, Burnet agreed to run for president. Lamar and his cronies only reluctantly supported Burnet after they could not entice Rusk to run. Burnet's primary competition was Houston, and insults and name-calling dominated the campaign. Houston questioned Burnet's honesty by accusing him of taking a $250,000 bribe from Santa Anna and calling him a "political brawler" and a "canting hypocrite." Houston also accused Burnet of being a drunk. Burnet again challenged Houston to a duel, but again, Houston refused. Houston won the election with 7,915 votes to Burnet's 3,619.

== Later life ==
After losing the presidential election, Burnet returned to his farm. When Texas was annexed into the United States, Burnet served as the state's first Secretary of State under Governor James Pinckney Henderson. His feud with Houston continued, and in 1852, Burnet wrote the pamphlet "Review of the Life of General Sam Houston," which recounted many rumors and allegations of Houston's improper behavior. Houston retaliated in February 1859 by giving a speech on the floor of the US Senate that disparaged Burnet.

Burnet's health deteriorated, and he needed help with his farm work. He and his wife purchased an enslaved Black man and his wife for $1400. The man escaped, robbing the Burnets in the process. Unable to make ends meet on their own, Burnet and his wife rented their 300 acres (1.2 km^{2}) to another family in 1857 while they continued to live in their house.

Hannah Burnet died on October 30, 1858. Their only surviving child, William Estey Burnet, took a leave of absence from his military service and helped Burnet move to Galveston, where he lived with an old friend, Sidney Sherman. Burnet opposed secession and was saddened when his son joined the Confederate Army but later supported his son's efforts. Colonel William Burnet was killed on March 31, 1865, at Spanish Fort, Alabama, leaving Burnet as the only surviving member of his family.

In 1865, Sherman's wife died, and Burnet left Sherman's home to live with Preston Perry. The following year, the first Reconstruction state legislature appointed Burnet and Oran Roberts to be US senators from Texas. Neither man could take the Ironclad oath, so they were not permitted to take their Senate seats.

Burnet's last public service came in 1868 when he was appointed as a delegate to the Democratic National Convention, which nominated Horatio Seymour for president. In his later years, Burnet experienced senility. Before his death, he had carried a trunk of his private papers into an empty lot and burned them all.

He died on December 5, 1870, aged 82, in Galveston. He was first buried in Magnolia Cemetery, but in 1894, his remains were moved to Galveston's Lakeview Cemetery, where he was buried next to Sidney Sherman's grave.

Burnet County was named in his honor when it was formed in 1852, as was its county seat. In 1936, the state erected a statue of Burnet in Clarksville. David G. Burnet Elementary School in Dallas and David G. Burnet Elementary School in Odessa are named in his honor.

== See also ==
- Notable Freemasons

Political offices
Preceded by Office created	President of the Republic of Texas (ad interim); 1836	Succeeded by Sam Houston first term
Preceded by Mirabeau B. Lamar	Vice President of the Republic of Texas; December 10, 1838 – December 13, 1841	Succeeded by Edward Burleson
Preceded by Charles Mariner	Secretary of State of Texas; 1846–1848	Succeeded by Washington D. Miller
