= Sidney Sherman Bridge =

- Aerial view of the bridge in 2014
- Coordinates: 29.725086°N 95.266421°W
- Carries: 10 general purpose lanes of I-610
- Crosses: Houston Ship Channel; Buffalo Bayou
- Locale: Houston, Texas
- Official name: Sidney Sherman Bridge
- Named for: Sidney Sherman
- Maintained by: Texas Department of Transportation

Characteristics
- Design: strutted girder
- Width: 152 feet (46 m)
- Longest span: 600 feet (180 m)
- Clearance below: 135 feet (41 m)

History
- Opened: March 2, 1973; 53 years ago

Location
- Interactive map of Sidney Sherman Bridge

The Sidney Sherman Bridge is a strutted girder bridge in Houston, Texas. It spans the Houston Ship Channel (Buffalo Bayou) and carries the East Loop segment of Interstate 610 on the east side of the city. It is more popularly known as the 610 Bridge or Ship Channel Bridge.

== History ==
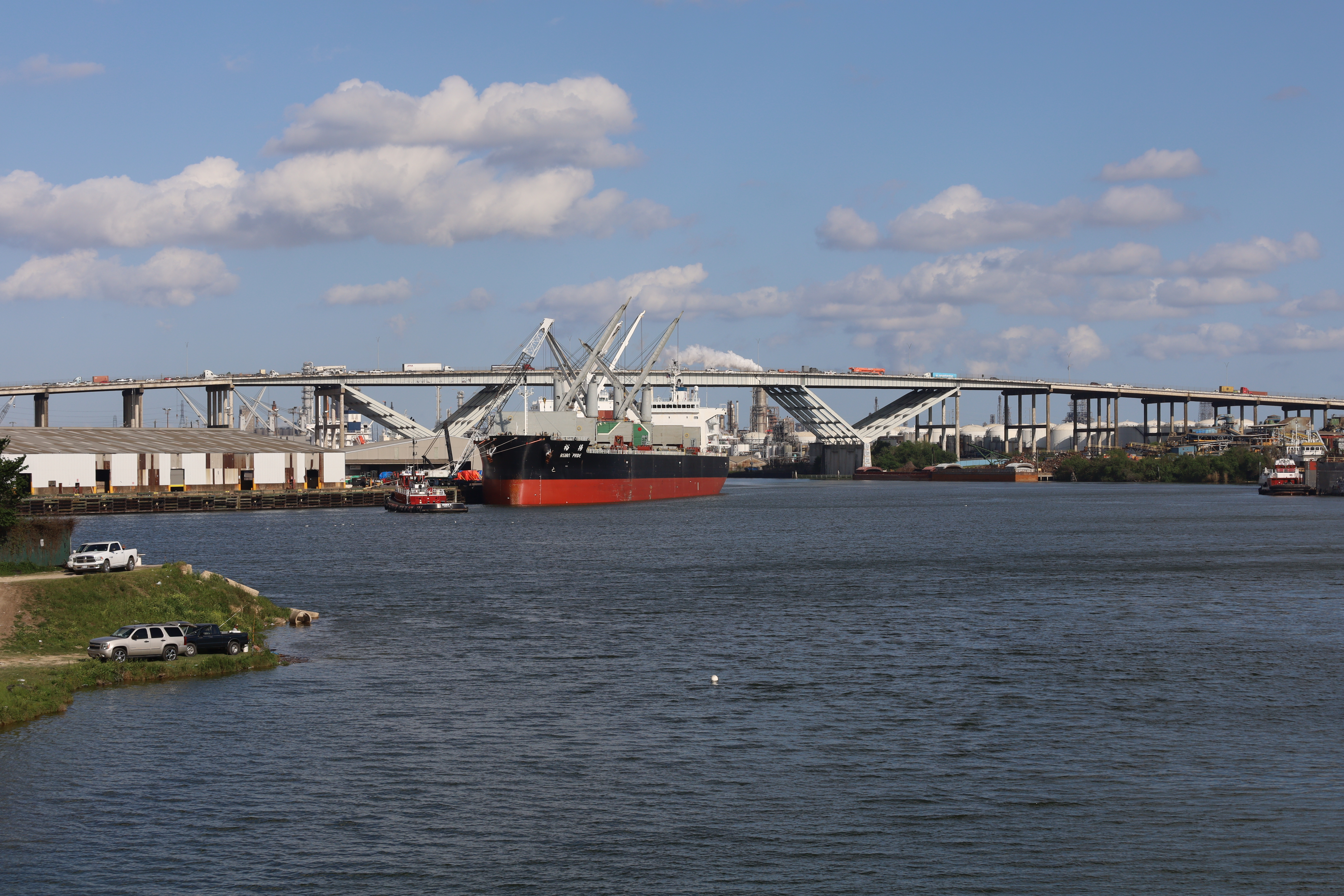
The bridge in 2026

Construction on the bridge was on the planning boards by the Texas Department of Transportation (TxDoT)as far back as 1962. Originally planned with a 400-foot (120 m) mainspan, it was rejected by the Army Corps of Engineers for fear that the narrow main span was a hazard to ships on the Ship Channel. So, a 600 feet (180 m) main span was in the plans, instead, and the Army Corps approved of the design.

Construction on the bridge started in 1969, and it opened to traffic on March 2, 1973 (along with the East Loop of I-610). Just a year before, the National Society of Professional Engineers named the new bridge one of the top-10 outstanding engineering achievements in the nation.

In 1974, it was renamed the Sidney Sherman Bridge after Sidney Sherman, who led the Texas Revolution and took part in making the Houston Ship Channel good for navigation.

== Controversy ==
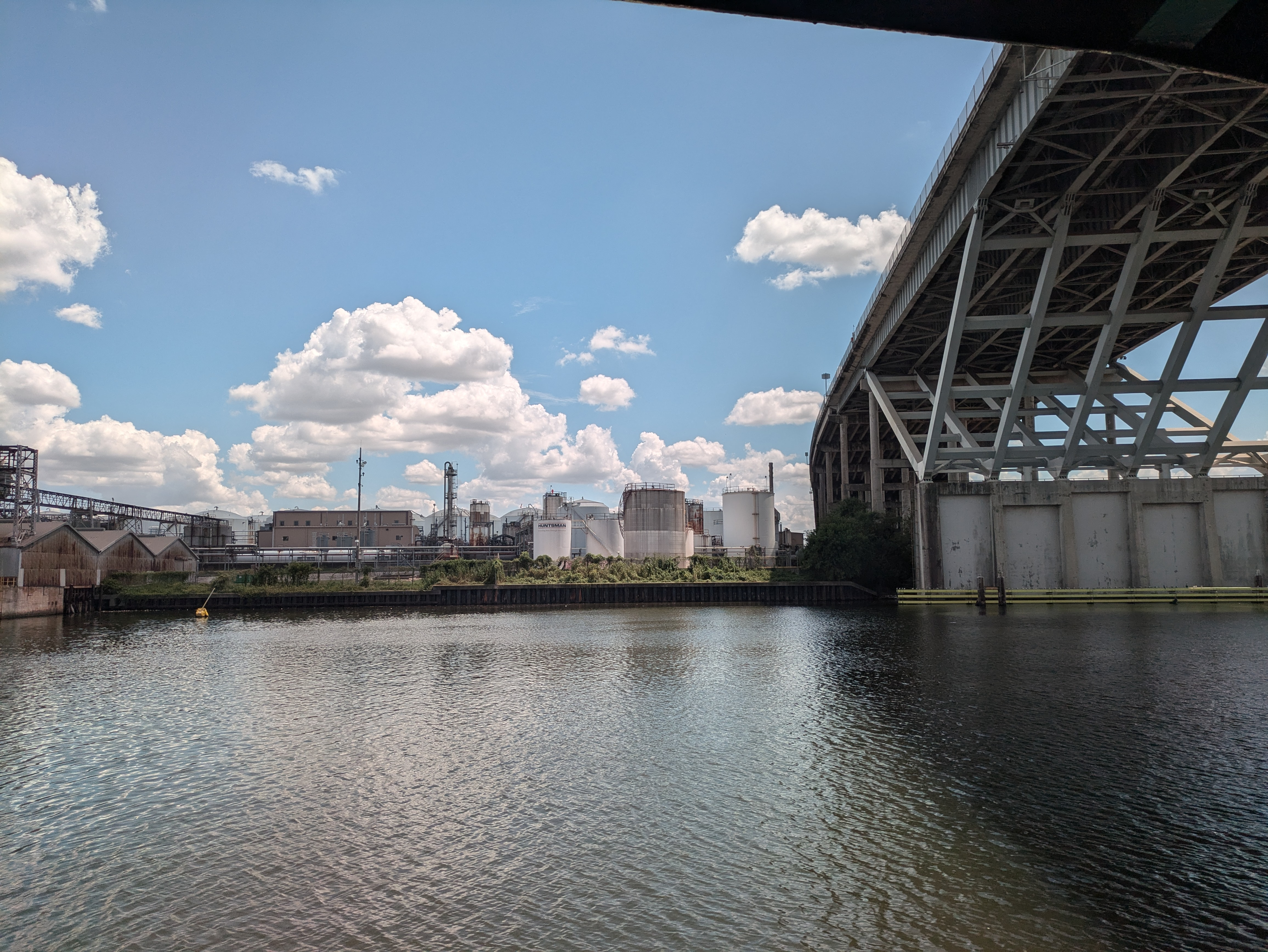
Underside of the bridge in 2024

The bridge clearance is 135 feet (41 m), which some officials have deemed too low for ships to navigate. By the time the V-struts supporting the mainspan were put in place, the Port of Houston claimed the struts were an even more dangerous hazard to ships that must veer from the middle of the waterway. By some accounts, port officials protested, but TxDoT did not listen to their pleas. The bridge cost TxDoT $19 million in its current configuration; a higher clearance would have cost more, and the agency went on to investigate that ships did not need 120 feet (37 m).

This decision proved to be a mistake. Several ships have collided with the bridge over 27 years, but despite this, the bridge only suffered minor damage and was still intact. That all changed in December 2000, when a cargo crane struck the bridge, knocking a hole in the concrete deck and damaging a steel beam. The damage took six weeks to repair, forcing several lanes to be closed in the process. The worst accident, though, happened in May 2001, when a freighter's cargo boom caused severe damage to a girder and put another gaping hole in the span. Several lanes of the bridge were closed for two months while repairs were completed.
