= Philip Cuney =

American politician (1807–1866)

Philip Minor Cuney Sr. (March 15, 1807 – January 8, 1866) was a soldier, plantation owner, enslaver and politician in Texas. He served in the House of Representatives of the Republic of Texas in 1843, and then in the Texas State Senate from 1846 as a member of the Democratic party. His surname was originally spelled Cuny with the 'e' being added around the time he joined the legislature and his white descendants tended to use the original Cuny while Cuney was used by his black descendants. He owned the large Sunnyside Plantation south-east of Hempstead and held over 100 people enslaved. By 1860 he held 115 people enslaved, among the most of any enslaver in Texas. He not only grew cotton like most plantations but also grew sweet potatoes and corn and later moving into dairy with 700 dairy cows.

Cuney was born in Rapides Parish, Louisiana to Richard Edmond and Tabitha (Wells) Cuney, who already had five other sons, and was of Swiss descent. He moved to Austin County, Texas, about 1837-1840 after the death of his first wife Carolina Scott in 1834. He married his second wife, Eliza Ware, in 1842, and they had three children. Eliza also added 1,200 head of cattle and other wealth to the Sunnyside Plantation. Although initially he had grown to be a wealthy land and enslaver, he went into debt after the emancipation of people he had enslaved were emancipated, and owed $110,000 at his death. He served as a brigadier general in the Texas state militia as part of the First Brigade of the Fourth Division.

Cuney also had eight children with a woman he enslaved of mixed ("mulatto") European and African origin named Adeline Stuart. Their children were, by law, also enslaved; he later set them free. One of their sons became a leading politician, Texas Republican Party leader and banker Norris Wright Cuney; Cuney's granddaughter Maud Cuney Hare had a successful career as a concert pianist, playwright, and activist.

While serving in the House of Representatives of the Republic of Texas he generally voted in line with limiting the governments power both legislatively and administratively, voting against the ability to appoint judges and other positions in favor of elective positions. He also voted to keep legal slavery but to allow owners to free the people they had enslaved.

He served in the Texas Senate from 1846 to 1849 in the 1st and 2nd Legislatures of the state after being admitted to the union in 1845. He stood on the Military Affairs and on the Claims and Accounts committees as well as serving on other special committees. Just prior to the end of the second term Cuney called for the resignation of the controversial judge John Charles Watrous.

He stood again in 1851 but was unsuccessful, and in the same year he married his third wife, Adeline Spurlock. In 1853 he moved to Houston, with Spurlock and his children, as well as Adeline Stuart and their children, who were still enslaved. In Houston, Cuney began to educate and free his enslaved children. He died January 8, 1866, after a long illness.
