= College Mound, Texas =

- Unincorporated community
- Location within Texas Location within the United States
- Coordinates: 32°40′22″N 96°11′13″W
- Country: United States
- State: Texas
- County: Kaufman
- Elevation: 518 ft (158 m)

Population (2000)
  - Total: 350
- Time zone: UTC-6 (Central (CST))
  - Summer (DST): UTC-5 (CDT)
- GNIS feature ID: 2034629

College Mound is an unincorporated community in Kaufman County, located in the U.S. state of Texas. Established in the 1840's, it's a town known for its winding roads, sweeping pastoral views, picturesque church, and historical cemetery. In September, 2026, residents banded together to prevent a concrete batch plant from operating in the community. According to the Handbook of Texas, the community had a population of 350 in 2000. It is located within the Dallas/Fort Worth Metroplex.

== History ==
College Mound (Kaufman County) was home to Caddo Nation Native Americans,prior to being established as one of the first communities in Kaufman County, and was first settled by people from Indiana and Tennessee in the 1840s. It had several stores, a cotton gin, and a church sometime after. A Methodist church was erected in 1845 and had a cemetery that next year. A permanent church site was deeded on land given by W.T. Patton in 1866 and was built in 1897. The building hosted five different religious denominations: Methodist, Presbyterian, Christian, Missionary Baptist, and Primitive Baptist. A post office was established at College Mound in 1850 and remained in operation until 1874, with an interruption during the American Civil War. John L. Beck served as the postmaster. The church remained a focal point of the community in the 1980s, with many of its members being descendants of the original settlers. It had several scattered houses, the church, and a cemetery during that time. Its population was 350 in 2000.

In July of 2026, a concrete batch plant applied for a TCEQ "Air Quality Permit". The facility wound have introduced a major industrial operation into the established rural community of homes, farms, livestock, businesses, churches, and wildlife habitats. College Mound United Methodist Church, the Historic Schoolhouse, and the historic College Mound Cemetery stood within 1000 yards of the proposed site. Citizens quickly banded together to alert neighbors by making calls, displaying yard signs, passing out flyers. An action group formed and created a website. More than 200 letters and comments were filed to the TCEQ, asking for a formal public meeting. Elected officials formally requested a contested case hearing. More than 250 signs were placed along the roads. On October 9, 2026, the concrete company withdrew its application. Protect College Mound continues to keep their lawyer on retainer.

== Geography ==
College Mound is located on Farm to Market Road 429, 5 mi (8.0 km) southeast of Terrell in eastern Kaufman County.

== Education ==
There were plans to build a college in the community, but they were never carried out. College Mound soon had its own school that joined the Terrell Independent School District in 1949.

== Notable person ==
- William Madison McDonald, politician, businessman, and banker, was born in College Mound.
