= Sidney Sherman =

Texian soldier and general

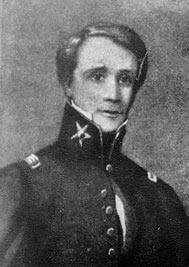
- Sherman, c. 1843
- Born: July 23, 1805; Marlboro, Massachusetts, U.S.
- Died: August 1, 1873 (aged 68); Galveston, Texas, U.S.
- Burial place: Lakeview Cemetery, Galveston
- Military career
- Allegiance: Republic of Texas
- Branch: Texas Army
- Service years: 1836–1837; 1843
- Conflicts: Battle of San Jacinto

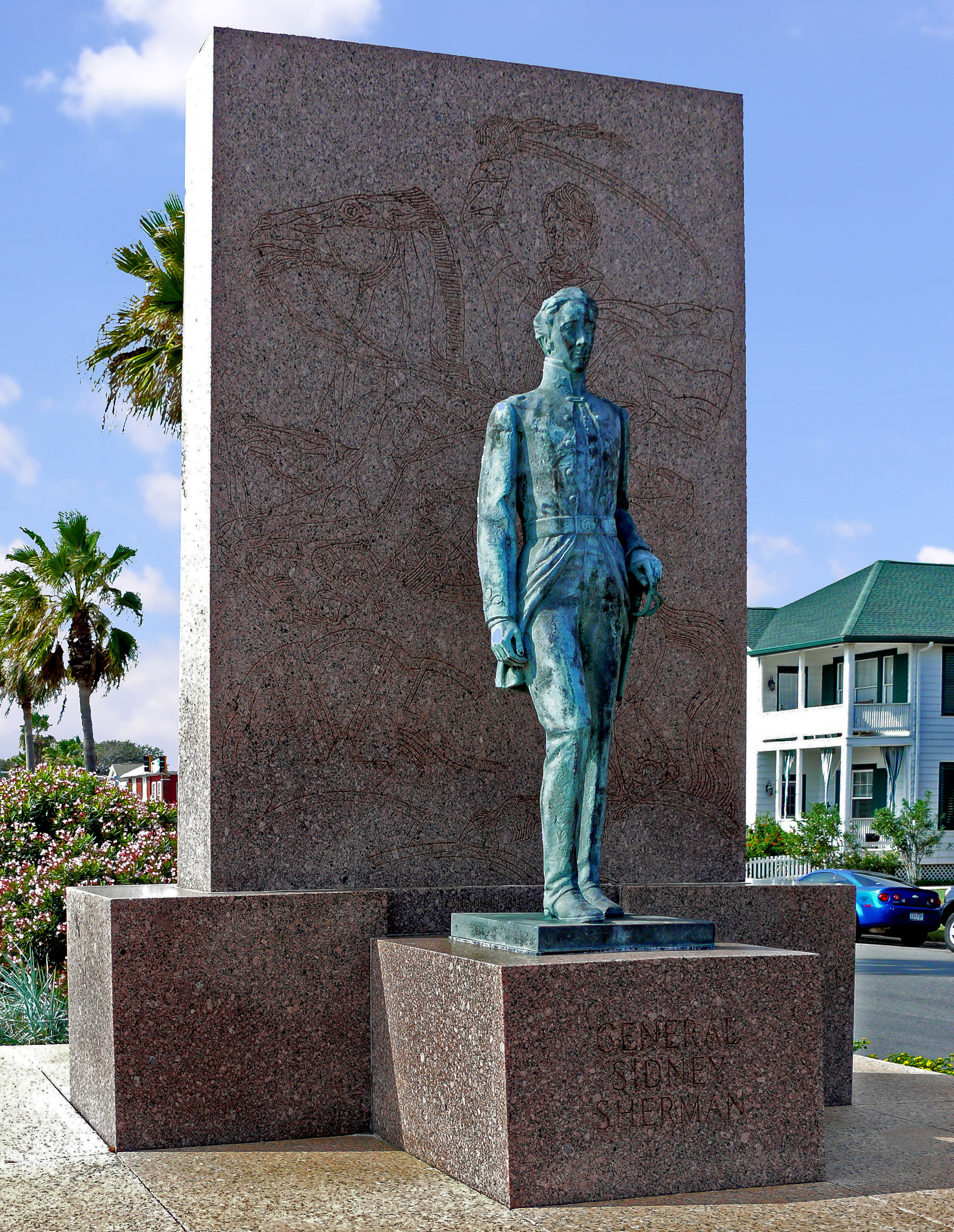
Memorial to General Sidney Sherman on one of the main boulevards in Galveston

Sidney Sherman (July 23, 1805 – August 1, 1873) was a Texian general and a key leader in the Texas Army during the Texas Revolution and afterwards.

== Early life ==
Sherman was born in Marlboro, Massachusetts, a son of Michah and Susanna Dennison Frost Sherman. When his parents died, leaving him orphaned at the age of 12, Sherman moved to Boston, where he began working as a clerk in Boston mercantile houses four years later.

He soon moved to New York City, and in 1831, resettled in Newport, Kentucky, where he engaged in the manufacture of cotton bagging. On April 27, 1835, Sherman married Catharine Isabel Cox (1815–1865) of Frankfort, Kentucky, with whom he eventually had eight children. Sherman's business prospered and he became well known and influential in the community.

== Texas Revolution and the Republic of Texas ==
In November 1835, a public meeting was held in neighboring Cincinnati to encourage support for Texas in her struggle against the Mexican government. A number of Cincinnatians and northern Kentuckians pledged funding for ammunition and weapons (including the two artillery pieces later made famous as the "Twin Sisters" of the Battle of San Jacinto). They left by riverboat to start their journey for Texas on January 6, 1836, with Sherman serving as captain of the company, which called itself the "Kentucky Rifles". Local citizens helped fund uniforms and donated a flag.

Sherman arrived in Texas in late January, and joined the main Texian Army or Texas Army gathering near Gonzales on February 3. On March 12, many of the new volunteers for the army joined with Sam Houston and were organized into one regiment, with Edward Burleson elected colonel and Sherman his lieutenant. With volunteers still streaming into Texas, enough men were recruited to fill out a second regiment. On April 8, the army was reorganized and the Second Regiment formed with Sherman as its colonel, though his old company remained in the First Regiment. Sherman led his troops at the Battle of San Jacinto, and they are generally credited as first uttering the famous warcry, "Remember the Alamo! Remember Goliad!"

In August, Sherman became colonel of the cavalry of the new Republic of Texas and returned home to Kentucky to recruit more men for the Texian army. For his services in the revolution, he was granted large tracts of land as a token of gratitude by the legislature. When he returned to Texas in December, he brought his wife and her young 11-year-old brother back with him, settling near San Jacinto Bay and constructing a small home. Other family members soon settled nearby, although yellow fever killed Sherman's brother Dana and his sister-in-law. Sherman served in the cavalry commander's role until mid-December 1837.

Sherman was a member of the Texas House of Representatives, from Harris County, during the Seventh Congress, November 4, 1842, to January 17, 1843. He introduced a bill providing for the election of a major general of militia for the protection of the frontier, which was passed over the veto of President Sam Houston. Thomas J. Rusk briefly assumed the position, with Sherman as his successor in mid-1843.

== Later life ==
In 1846, General Sherman purchased 4,000 acres (16 km^{2}) of land near Harrisburg and began promoting the Buffalo Bayou, Brazos, and Colorado Railway (later part of the Southern Pacific system). He constructed a mansion in 1847, as well as a nearby sawmill. However, both were lost in separate fires within a decade. Without insurance and having lost most of his fortune, he moved to Galveston and opened a hotel.

During the American Civil War, Sherman was appointed commandant of Galveston by the secession convention and requested by the local Committee of Safety to take full charge of affairs at Galveston, with full authority to put the island in a state of defense. In 1862, he moved with his family to his old home on the San Jacinto Bay and with them went former Republic of Texas President David G. Burnet. On January 1, 1863, Sherman's son, Sidney Sherman Jr, is one of the first to be killed during John B. Magruder's attack at the Battle of Galveston. Later that year, the Shermans moved to Richmond, Texas, where they remained until the close of the war.

On August 1, 1873, Sidney Sherman died at the residence of his daughter, Mrs. J. M. O. Menard, in Galveston, Texas. He died at 7:45 p.m., at the age of 68. He was originally buried near his wife and son, but was reinterred in 1894 in the Lakeview Cemetery in Galveston, next to one of his sons and his friend David G. Burnet. The Sidney Sherman Chapter of the Daughters of the Republic of Texas dedicated a joint monument to their memories on March 2, 1894.

== Legacy ==
Sherman County and the city of Sherman in Grayson County, Texas, are named in his honor.

Sidney Sherman Bridge in Houston, Texas, crossing the Houston Ship Channel, is named in his honor.

This Texian General Sidney Sherman (and not Union Army Major General William Tecumseh Sherman) was the namesake of the Buffalo Bayou, Brazos, and Colorado engine the General Sherman, the first railroad locomotive in Texas
