= Norris Wright Cuney =

American politician (1846–1898)

Chair of the Texas Republican Party
- In office 1886–1896
- Preceded by: Edmund J. Davis
- Succeeded by: William Madison McDonald

Personal details
- Born: May 12, 1846 Hempstead, Texas, U.S.
- Died: March 3, 1898 (aged 51) San Antonio, Texas, U.S.
- Resting place: Lakeview Cemetery, Galveston, Texas; 29°16′52″N 94°49′33″W
- Party: Republican
- Children: Maud Cuney Hare, Lloyd Garrison Cuney
- Parent(s): Philip Cuney; Adeline Stuart

Norris Wright Cuney (May 12, 1846 – March 3, 1898) was an American politician, businessman, union leader, and advocate for the rights of African-Americans in Texas. Following the American Civil War, he became active in Galveston politics, serving as an alderman and a national Republican delegate. He was appointed as United States Collector of Customs in 1889 in Galveston. Cuney had the highest-ranking appointed position of any African American in the late 19th-century South. He was a member of the Union League and helped attract black voters to the Republican Party; in the 1890s, more than 100,000 blacks were voting in Texas.

Establishing his own stevedores business, he helped to unionize black workers in Galveston, opening jobs for them on the docks. He substantially improved employment and educational opportunities for blacks in the city. He eventually rose to the chairmanship of the Texas Republican Party and became a national committeeman. Cuney also succeeded the presidency of the Texas House of Councils following George Ruby tenure.

Cuney is regarded by many as the most important black leader in Texas in the 19th century and one of the most important in the United States.

== Early life and education ==
Norris Wright Cuney was born on May 12, 1846, near Hempstead, Texas, in the Brazos River valley. He was the fourth of eight children of Adeline Stuart, a mixed-race slave of African, European, and Native American ancestry. Among his mixed-race siblings, all of whom were white-passing, were his older brother Joseph, who later became an attorney, and his younger brother Nelson, who became a building and painting contractor. Their father was Adeline's white master, colonel Philip Cuney, a wealthy planter of English ancestry. He had a white "first" family and eventually married a total of three white wives after the earliest ones died in childbirth or from disease. All his mixed-race children were enslaved at birth. Philip Cuney was a politician and was elected as a state senator.

By 1850, Philip Cuney was one of the largest landowners in the state, with 2,000 acres and 105 slaves, including Stuart and her children. In 1860 he was one of the 50 largest slaveowners in the state. Cuney raised cotton but also had a dairy operation, with several hundred cows, plus beef cattle brought to the marriage by his second wife, Adeline Ware, with whom he had three children before her death before 1850. He married for the third time in 1851. Cuney considered Houston his home, where he settled in 1853.

By the principle of partus sequitur ventrem, adopted from the model of Virginia colonial slave law, the mixed-race, majority-white Stuart children were all enslaved at birth, as their mother was enslaved. Their father freed his mixed-race children and their mother sometime before the Civil War, starting with the oldest son Joseph in 1853. He sent his sons to Pittsburgh, Pennsylvania to the Wylie Street School for Blacks for education. When Norris was freed in 1859, he took his father's surname of Cuney. His father also sent him to Pittsburgh for schooling at that time. Jennie Cuney was freed and sent to Europe for her education; she later passed into white society, consistent with her majority-white ancestry. The Civil War interrupted Norris' plans to attend Oberlin College in Ohio, which was open to students of all races and both genders.

After the outset of the war, Norris Cuney gained work on a steamship that traveled on the Ohio and Mississippi rivers between Cincinnati and New Orleans. Spending a great deal of time in New Orleans, he became friends with influential figures such as P. B. S. Pinchback, a mixed-race man educated in the North who returned to the South after the war. He was elected as a Republican lieutenant governor of Louisiana and succeeded to the position of the state's first Black governor.

At the end of the war, Cuney moved back to Texas and settled in Galveston. He entered postwar society as a literate, educated son of a wealthy and powerful white politician father, which gave him social advantages. His mother and brothers joined him in Galveston, where they lived within a few blocks of each other. Cuney began self-study in law and literature.

After the war, Cuney met George T. Ruby, a representative of the Freedmen's Bureau, the federal agency responsible for providing aid to former slaves and helping them negotiate a free-labor society. Its headquarters in Texas were in Galveston. Ruby was secretly a director of the Union League, an organization dedicated to attracting freedmen to the Republican Party. (It was a relatively small organization in Texas at the time, as the Democratic Party had dominated southern white politics and Texas was a white-majority state). Cuney became increasingly involved with the Union League and Ruby's ideology. In 1870 there were 3,000 blacks in Galveston, nearly one-quarter of its 13,818 total population recorded in the US Census that year.

== Career ==
Cuney's career rose with Galveston's growth as a port and progressive city. In 1870 he was appointed first sergeant-at-arms of the Texas Legislature. He befriended the Republican governor Edmund J. Davis. He was appointed as a state delegate to the 1872 Republican National Convention and served in this role for the next two decades, attending every convention until 1892.

In 1871, Cuney's interest in educational opportunities for blacks led to his appointment as one of the school directors for Galveston County. The biracial Reconstruction-era legislature established a public school system in Texas for the first time, and the state was setting it up. Cuney worked to ensure that tax allocations guaranteed education for black students in the segregated system.

Cuney was appointed head of the Galveston chapter of the Union League in 1871. As George T. Ruby left Texas politics, Cuney gained much of his notoriety as succeeding president of Texas House of Councils. Ruby had been strongly connected to unpopular Reconstruction programs. In 1873, Cuney was appointed secretary of the Republican State Executive Committee. That same year he presided over the Texas convention of black leaders in Brenham.

In 1872, Cuney was appointed as the federal inspector of customs for the Port of Galveston and revenue inspector at Sabine Pass. Cuney became a popular figure in the community. As reform efforts in the city were pushed forward by the community's business leaders, including the Galveston Cotton Exchange garnering support for harbor improvements, Cuney was asked to participate.

This was a period of dramatic growth in the South and nationally of black fraternal organizations, part of the political organizing by freedmen. While not active in any church, Cuney joined Amity Lodge #4 The Most Worshipful National Grand Lodge of Free & Accepted Ancient York Rite Masons, National Compact. He recruited new members and contributed to the growth of Prince Hall Freemasonry in Texas. Black lodges were not recognized by Freemasonry in the United States, which banned people of color, until the last decade of the 20th century. In 1875, Cuney was elected the first Grand Master of the Most Worshipful Grand Lodge, Free and Accepted Ancient York Masons of the State of Texas, known today as the Most Worshipful Prince Hall Grand Lodge of Texas. Cuney also was involved with the Knights of Pythias of North America, South America, Europe, Asia, Africa and Australia and the Grand United Order of Odd Fellows in America.

Cuney entered the race for Galveston mayor in 1875 but lost. He similarly lost bids for the state House of Representatives and Senate in 1876 and 1882, respectively. The latter election was after Reconstruction had officially ended in the South with the withdrawal of federal troops. In 1883, Cuney was elected alderman of the twelfth district on the Galveston City Council.

In 1882, Cuney was appointed to the higher position of special inspector for customs at the port. In 1883 he began a stevedore business, employing 500 black dock workers loading and unloading ships. He later organized the black dockworkers into a labor union known as the "Colored Screwmen's Benevolent Association". At the time white unions controlled the labor market on the docks. Cuney pushed black workers to cross white picket lines and accept lower wages to increase the black presence on the docks and weaken white bargaining power against them. He recruited additional black dock workers from New Orleans. Though inequities remained, the Trades Assembly was gradually forced to re-evaluate its racial policies and grant concessions. In 1889 Cuney was appointed as the US Collector of Customs for the port, the highest-ranking federal appointee position of a black in the late 19th-century South.

In 1886, Cuney was elected as the Texas national committeeman in the Republican Party and became the Texas party chairman, the most powerful position of any African American in the South during that century. Cuney's popularity enabled him to shape the Republican Party in Texas; his opponents, white and black, were initially unable to challenge his authority in most matters. His role and his importance became nationally recognized, and his accomplishments were reported by The New York Times.

Cuney's elevation to the Texas Republican chairmanship aggravated some white Republicans in Texas and nationwide. Since Lincoln's Emancipation Proclamation, many whites in the young Republican party had worried about alienating Southern whites if blacks were allowed to gain too much influence in the party. Although initially the power of the black vote was seen favorably by the party leaders, this sentiment gradually changed. At the 1888 Republican National Convention, a group of conservative whites attempted to have a number of important black leaders expelled, leading Cuney to coin the term Lily-White Movement to describe the trend. Cuney maintained control of the party in Texas for a time. The majority of the state's population was white, and most were affiliated with the Democratic Party. Some smaller planters and yeomen farmers joined the Republican Party.

== Personal life ==
On July 5, 1871, Cuney had married Adelina Dowdie, a local school teacher. Beautiful with grey eyes, she was also mixed race, the daughter of a mulatto enslaved mother and a white planter father. The couple had two children, Maud and Lloyd Garrison Cuney (the boy was named after prominent abolitionist William Lloyd Garrison of Massachusetts). The parents were both musical: Cuney played the violin and Adelina was a soprano singer. They filled their house with music and art, emphasized education for their children, had them learn Shakespeare, and worked to shelter them from the racism of Galveston society. With two of Cuney's brothers and their families nearby, the children and their cousins regularly enjoyed frequent gatherings and events together.

Maud Cuney (later known as Maud Cuney Hare after her marriage), studied in Boston at the New England Conservatory of Music. She settled there, writing a biography of her father, published in 1913, and becoming an accomplished pianist, musicologist, author, and community organizer in the city. It had a relatively large population of blacks, many of them migrants from the South. Lloyd Cuney was also well educated; he became an official in the Congregational Church.

Cuney amassed considerable wealth, attaining an estimated net worth of approximately $150,000 in 1893 ($5.38 million in today's dollars), according to The New York Times..

== Legacy ==
Some Texas historians refer to the period of the state between 1884 and 1896 as the "Cuney era". It is noted as a time of significant political gains by blacks in Texas. Cuney's efforts to recruit and register blacks contributed to a total of more than 100,000 blacks voting annually in the state during the 1890s (more than 15% of the black population or 4% of the total). The increased power of unionized black dock workers eventually led to interracial unions in Galveston during the decade from the 1890s to the early 1900s.

By the time of Cuney's death, white conservative Democratic-dominated southern state legislatures were passing new constitutions and laws to disenfranchise blacks and poor white voters to expel them from politics and secure their dominance after having lost some offices in the biracial coalitions of Populists-Republicans at the end of the century. From 1890 to 1908, beginning with Mississippi, state legislatures created barriers to voter registration that resulted in dramatic reductions of voter rolls and nearly total exclusion of blacks from the political systems. For instance, Texas instituted required payment of poll taxes and restricting voting in the Democratic nominating process to white primaries. The number of black voters in Texas was sharply reduced from 100,000 in the 1890s to less than 5,000 in 1906. By the 1930s, and the Great Depression, racial strife in the unions, in part encouraged by the employers as well as segregationists, had broken much of the former labor cooperation between blacks and whites.

Cuney's example continued to inspire other black leaders. Following his being removed from the Texas Republican chairmanship, William Madison McDonald, a black Fort Worth banker, formed an alliance with multimillionaire Edward H. R. Green to lead the party. Blacks were disenfranchised and closed out of politics from 1912 on as the "Lily White Movement" dominated the Texas Republicans. Passage in the 1960s of federal civil rights laws was needed before Texas blacks fully recovered their ability to exercise their constitutional right to vote.

=== Memorials ===
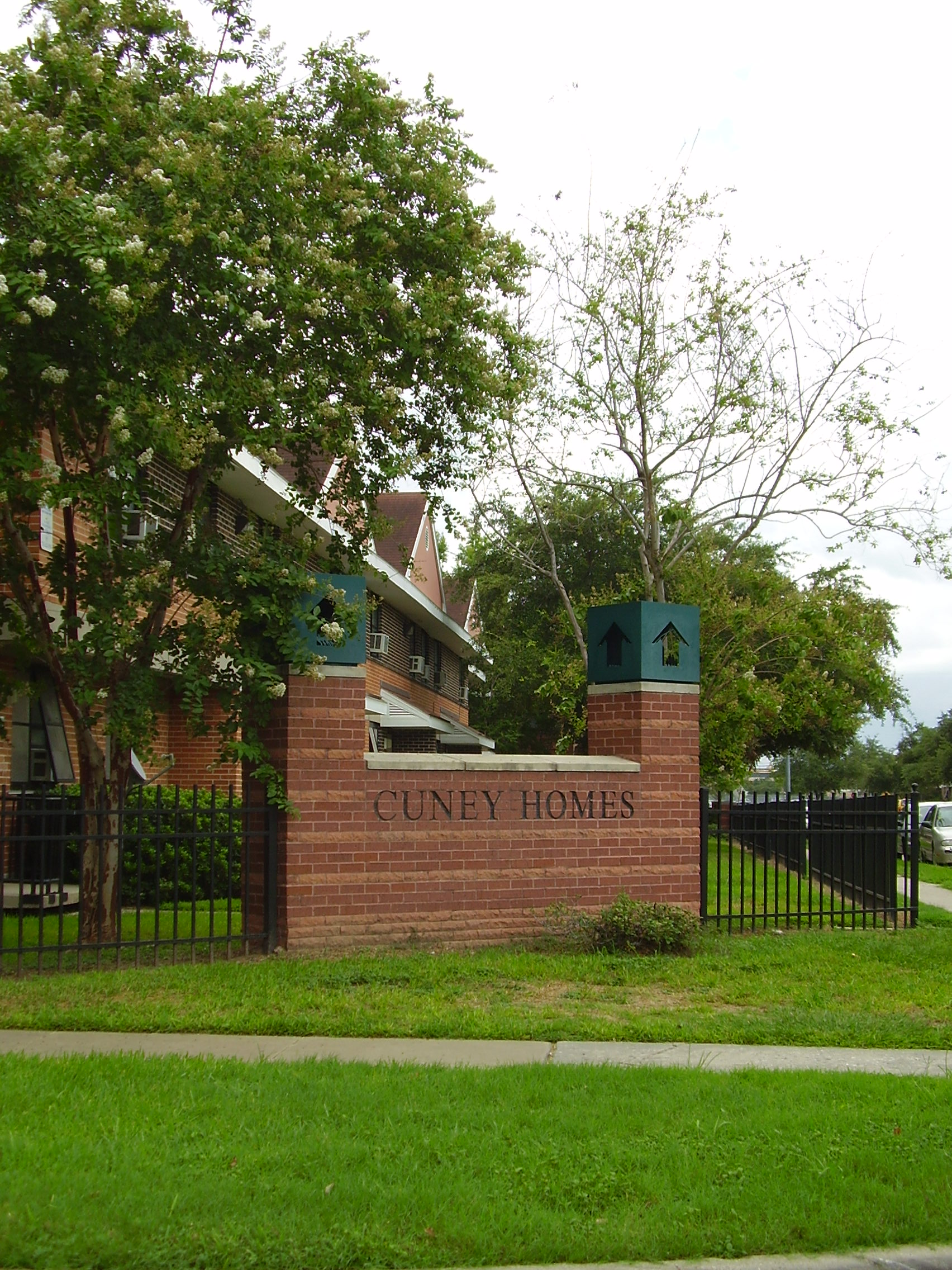
Cuney Homes

Cuney is the namesake for various places and organizations including:

- Wright Cuney Park between Broadway and Harborside Drive near the wharfs in Galveston. It is the site of the city's annual Juneteenth celebration of emancipation of African-American slaves.
- The small town of Cuney, Texas, originally settled by freedmen, was named after Cuney Price, the son of H.L. Price, who incorporated the town. The younger Price (and thus the town) were named for Norris Wright Cuney.
- The Order of the Eastern Star, Prince Hall Affiliated, renamed its Grand Chapter as the Norris Wright Cuney Grand Chapter of Texas (PHA).
- Cuney Homes, a public housing complex owned and operated by the Houston Housing Authority (HHA), formerly Housing Authority of the City of Houston (HACH), was named for the politician. It is located near the campuses of Texas Southern University and the University of Houston.

== See also ==
- Civil rights movement (1865–1896)
- List of civil rights leaders
- Galveston, Texas
- Racism in the United States
- Texas Republican Party
- Union League
