= Hannah Este Burnet =

First Lady of the Republic of Texas

First Lady of the Republic of Texas Interim
- In office March 17, 1836 – October 22, 1836
- President: David G. Burnet
- Preceded by: Office established

Second Lady of the Republic of Texas
- In office December 31, 1838 – December 13, 1841
- Succeeded by: Sarah Griffen Owen Burleson

Personal details
- Born: 1800 Morristown, New Jersey, U.S.
- Died: 1858 (aged 57–58) Wooster, Texas, U.S.
- Spouse: David G. Burnet
- Children: 4

Hannah Este Burnet (1800–1858) was the interim First Lady of the Republic of Texas during her husband, David G. Burnet's term as interim president of the republic.

== Early life and family ==
Burnet was born in 1800 in Morristown, New Jersey. She was one of seven children of Captain Moses Este, a veteran of the American Revolutionary War, and Anne Kirkpatrick Este.

== Later life ==
In December 1830, she married David G. Burnet. She and her husband, David G. Burnet, moved from New Jersey to Galveston, Texas, where they built a home, established a farm, and built a lumber mill.

In 1833, her husband was elected as interim president of the Republic of Texas, at which time she became the inaugural first lady of the established republic. She later served as second lady during her husband's term as vice president.

She died in 1858 and was buried in Baytown, Texas.
