= Lakeview Cemetery (Galveston, Texas) =

Cemetery in Galveston County, Texas

Details
- Location: Galveston, Texas
- Country: United States
- Coordinates: 29°16′19″N 94°49′31″W
- Owned by: Termini Levy Funeral Home
- Find a Grave: Lakeview Cemetery

Lakeview Cemetery is a privately owned cemetery located in Galveston, Texas between 57th and 59th Streets with its north side along Avenue T 1/2.

== Notable burials ==
- David G. Burnet (1788–1870), Republic of Texas President
- Norris Wright Cuney (1846–1898), politician, businessman, union leader, and African-American activist
- Walter Gresham (1841–1920), U.S. Congressman from Texas's 10th congressional district
- Maud Cuney Hare (1874–1936), pianist, musicologist, writer, and African-American activist
- Robert B. Hawley (1849–1921), U.S. Congressman from Texas's 10th congressional district
- Louis (Blues Boy) Jones (1931–1984), R&B singer and songwriter
- Sidney Sherman (1805–1873), cavalry commander in the Texas Revolution and the Republic of Texas
- William H. Sinclair (1838–1897), state politician and Speaker of the Texas House from 1871 to 1873
