= Louise U. Jones =

American politician in Colorado

Louise U. Jones was a hotel proprietor and state legislator in Colorado. She represented the city and county of Denver in the Colorado House of Representatives. She ran the Hesse Hotel at the corner of Grant Street and Colfax Avenue. She was a Democrat and served in the legislature in 1911 and 1912.
