= Maud Cuney Hare =

American musician and author (1874–1936)

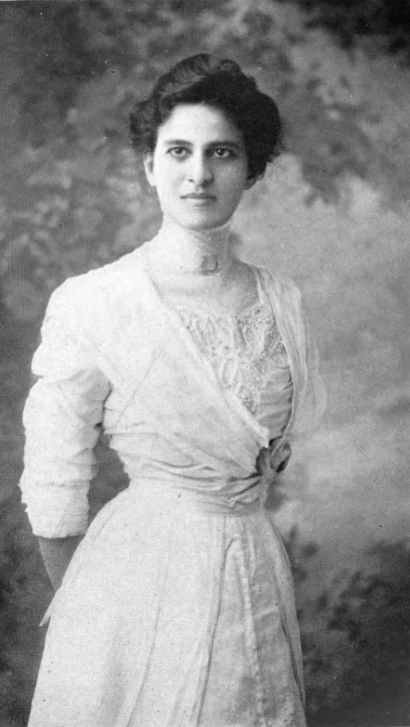
- Born: February 16, 1874; Galveston, Texas, US
- Died: February 13 or 14, 1936 (aged 61); Boston, Massachusetts, US
- Resting place: Lakeview Cemetery, Galveston; 29°16′52″N 94°49′33″W
- Other name: Maud Cuney
- Education: New England Conservatory of Music
- Known for: Documenting African-American culture
- Spouse: William Parker Hare
- Parent(s): Norris Wright Cuney, Adelina Dowdie Cuney

Maud Cuney Hare (née Cuney, February 16, 1874 – February 13 or 14, 1936) was an American pianist, musicologist, writer, and African-American activist in Boston, Massachusetts, in the United States. She was born in Galveston, Texas, the daughter of famed civil rights leader Norris Wright Cuney, who led the Texas Republican Party during and after the Reconstruction Era, and his wife Adelina (née Dowdie), a schoolteacher. In 1913, Cuney Hare published a biography of her father.

Essentially part of the second generation after emancipation, Cuney Hare studied at the New England Conservatory of Music in Boston and became an accomplished pianist. She lived in Jamaica Plain, a neighborhood of Boston, most of her adult life. A musicologist, she collected music from across the South and Caribbean in her study of folklore, and was the first to study Creole music. In 1929 she wrote the play Antar of Araby about Antar Bin Shaddad. Her final work, Negro Musicians and Their Music (1936), documents the development of African-American music.

== Early life ==
Maud was born in Galveston, Texas, on February 16, 1874, to Adelina (Dowdy, or Dowdie in alternate spelling) and her husband Norris Wright Cuney. Both parents were of mixed heritage; her father was of majority-white ancestry. Her mother, one of the "handsome Dowdy girls", came from Woodville, Mississippi. Her father's ancestry was African, Indian, European, and Swiss-American. The Cuney children were a "second family" related to a large, wealthy and politically powerful white family headed by Gen. Philip Minor Cuney of Austin County, Texas, who had been born in Louisiana. Norris Cuney was one of eight mixed-race children born to Cuney and his mixed-race slave housekeeper, Adeline Stuart. Philip Cuney acknowledged and freed his children and Stuart before the Civil War. By 1850, Cuney was one of the largest planters and slaveholders in Texas, with 2,000 acres and more than 100 slaves. He had eight white children born to his "legal" white wives: three children by his second wife, Eliza (Ware) Cuney, who died young; and five by his third wife, Adaline (Spurlock) Cuney.

Philip Cuney sent his mixed-race sons Joseph and Norris to Pittsburgh, Pennsylvania, before the war for their education. Afterwards, Norris worked on steamboats on the Mississippi River. Following the war, he became an established leader in the Texas Republican Party. He served in the Customs Office and later was appointed as Collector of Customs for the port of Galveston. He established a business of stevedore workers, employing about 500 men on the docks and organizing a union.

Interested in Shakespeare and other great writers, Norris Wright Cuney sang and played the violin; Adelina Dowdy Cuney was a soprano singer and played the piano. Maud and her brother Lloyd grew up in a house filled with music and literature.

== Education ==
After completing school at Galveston's Central High School in 1890, Maud Cuney went to Boston to attend the New England Conservatory of Music. There she studied piano with Edwin Klahre and music theory with Martin Roeder. She also studied at Harvard's Lowell Institute of Literature.

When white students learned that Maud Cuney and another African American, Florida L. Des Verney, were living in a campus dormitory, some of them tried to have the young women excluded. Fearing financial pressure from white southern families, the Conservatory requested that the women find other lodgings, implying that their safety could not be guaranteed. Maud Cuney told the school that she refused to move. Her father also refused to move her, criticizing the school for dishonoring "the noble men and women" abolitionists of Massachusetts who had fought against prejudice. Members of the Boston black community spoke out against the Conservatory, as did black students, including Harvard Cambridge student W. E. B. Du Bois. The Colored National League took up the issue, and the Conservatory eventually reversed its position. Though Des Verney moved away, Maud Cuney stayed. She later wrote: "I refused to leave the dormitory, and because of this, was subjected to many petty indignities. I insisted upon proper treatment."

Boston had a vibrant black community. While studying in Boston, Cuney became part of the Charles Street Circle (or West End Set), meeting at the home of Josephine St. Pierre Ruffin. She became a close friend of W. E. B. Du Bois, who was based in Massachusetts for a time, and they were briefly engaged. Du Bois described Maud vividly as "a tall, imperious brunette, with gold-bronze skin, brilliant eyes and coils of black hair."

== Teaching and performing career ==
After graduating from the conservatory, Cuney returned to Texas, studying privately with pianist Emil Ludwig in Austin. She taught at the Texas Deaf and Blind Institute for Colored Youths in 1897 and 1898. She chose to oppose racial prejudice when management of the Austin Opera House demanded that Negroes in the audience coming to her performance must be segregated and seated in the balconies. She and Emil Ludwig cancelled the planned concert and performed instead at the Texas Institute for Colored Youths, where no distinction of color was applied.

== Her parents deaths, marriage, and move to Chicago ==
Maud's mother, Adelina Dowdy Cuney, died on October 1, 1895, of tuberculosis. her father died on March 3, 1898, of the same disease, which at the time was considered incurable, as antibiotics had not been discovered. Later that year, Maud married J. Frank McKinley, a doctor 20 years her senior, who like Maud was of mixed race.

The McKinleys moved to Chicago, where Dr. McKinley insisted upon "passing" as Spanish-American. When their daughter Vera was born in 1900, her birth certificate identified her as Spanish-American. Maud, who had been brought up to assert her black heritage, found the deception painful. For a time, she hid her identity as her husband demanded, compensating by working in the settlement movement at the African Methodist Episcopal Institutional Church of Chicago. Eventually she left her husband, taking her baby daughter and returning to Texas. She obtained a teaching job at Prairie View Agricultural and Mechanical College, an historically black college. McKinley filed for divorce in 1902. Maud returned to Chicago for a highly visible custody battle that resulted in the court awarding custody of their daughter to her husband, as was typical of the era.

== Return to Boston ==
After the divorce, Maud returned to Boston. She married William Parker Hare on August 10, 1904, and from then on used the joint last name "Cuney Hare". The couple settled at 43 Sheridan Street, Jamaica Plain. Their house is marked by a Bostonian Society plaque, as part of the Boston Women's Heritage Trail. In 1906, Maud gained access to her daughter during the summer months, but Vera died in 1908.

Cuney Hare was politically active, and was among the first women to join the Niagara Movement in 1907, an organization founded against segregation. It was a predecessor to the National Association for the Advancement of Colored People (NAACP), founded in 1909. Throughout her career as a teacher, performer, and musicologist, Cuney Hare believed her work contributed to the "racial uplift" of her people.

=== Teacher, lecturer, and performer ===
As a teacher of music, Cuney had taught at the Texas Deaf, Dumb, and Blind Institute for Colored Youths in 1897 and 1898; at the settlement house program of the Institutional Church of Chicago during 1900 and 1901; and in Prairie View, Texas, in 1903 and 1904.

As a performing pianist and lecturer, Cuney Hare collaborated with William Howard Richardson, a Canadian baritone singer, beginning around 1913. They shared an interest in music of the African diaspora and toured together for 20 years. In 1919, they were the first musicians of color to perform in the concert-lecture series at the Boston Public Library.

=== Allied Arts Center founder ===
Cuney Hare founded the Allied Arts Center in Boston, to encourage education and performance in the arts. In addition to providing funding and serving as a manager, she performed and lectured there. The Center had a 'Little Theatre' group, and offered classes and performances in art, music, and drama. Although open to all, its focus was the development and support of young black performers, composers, and playwrights.

== Writing ==
Cuney Hare did extensive research as a musicologist. She traveled to Mexico, Cuba, the Virgin Islands, and Puerto Rico to collect and study folklore and musical traditions. She was "the first music scholar to direct public attention to Creole music", publishing a collection of Six Creole Folk-songs with commentary in 1921. Her personal collection of music and artifacts was extensive, and was used as the basis of exhibits.

Cuney Hare wrote numerous articles about black music and arts. Throughout her life, She was a close friend and confidante of noted author and activist W. E. B. Du Bois, once writing to him in frustration over a lecture by Egyptologist George Reisner that she had attended. Cuney Hare was frustrated by Reisner's incorrect racializing claim about the ancient people. She edited a column on music and the arts for The Crisis, the magazine that Du Bois edited for the National Association for the Advancement of Colored People (NAACP). She also contributed articles on these topics to the Christian Science Monitor, Musical Quarterly, Musical Observer, and Musical America.

Cuney Hare wrote and directed the play Antar of Araby (1929), about the pre-Islamic poet Antar Bin Shaddad. The overture was composed by Clarence Cameron White and incidental music by Montague Ring. Northwestern University has a playbill for it.

=== Negro Musicians and Their Music ===
Her writing about music culminated in her best-known work, Negro Musicians and Their Music (1936). In it, Cuney Hare documented the development of African-American music, contextualizing it both nationally and internationally. She writes compellingly of the history of African-American music, from its beginnings in Africa, through the diaspora to the United States and elsewhere, to the development of American traditions of Negro spirituals, and finally the newer forms of blues and jazz. She disliked ragtime, and distrusted the unstructured nature of Jazz music, preferring the classical traditions in which she had been trained. The index to the book contains no references to Duke Ellington, Scott Joplin or Louis Armstrong.

The book contains extensive details on the lives and music of Negro musicians both in America and abroad, in voluminous footnotes as well as the main text. The second book to address Negro music, and the first by a music scholar, it is described by Josephine Harreld Love as "a priceless legacy of accomplished documentation ... valuable for meticulous, sensitive scholarship, discernment, and devotion." Cuney Hare never saw the published book. Suffering from cancer, which prevented her from playing the piano, but not from proof-reading her manuscript, she died before it was published.

== Death ==
Maud Cuney Hare died on either February 13 or 14, 1936, in Boston, Massachusetts. A memorial service was held in Boston on February 17, 1936. Maud Cuney Hare is buried in an unmarked grave next to her father and mother in Lakeview Cemetery, Galveston, Texas.

== Works ==
- Norris Wright Cuney: A Tribune of the Black People (1913), a biography of her father.
- The Message of the Trees: An Anthology of Leaves and Branches (1918), a collection of nature poems, which Cuney Hare edited.
- Six Creole folk-songs : with original Creole and translated English text (1921)
- "Portuguese Folk-Songs, from Provincetown, Cape Cod, Massachusetts", The Musical Quarterly [0027-4631], 1928, vol:14 iss:1, pp. 35–53
- Antar of Araby (1929), a play revolving around the life of the Arab/Abyssinian poet whose "valor" outshines his status as a slave
- Negro Musicians and Their Music (1936), a history of African-American music traditions from Africa to the American Jazz Age ISBN 978-0-7838-1417-9.

== See also ==
- African-American music
- Racism in the United States
- Norris Wright Cuney
- W. E. B. Du Bois
- Women in musicology
