= Lewis Jones =

Lewis Jones may refer to:

== Government ==
- Lewis Jones (politician) (1884–1968), British politician, MP for Swansea West, 1931–1945
- G. Lewis Jones (1907–1971), American diplomat, Assistant Secretary of State for Near Eastern and South Asian Affairs, 1959–1961
- Lewis Jones (by 1519-67/69), MP for Leominster

== Sports ==
- Lewis Jones (Australian footballer) (1883–1960), Australian rules footballer
- Lewis Jones (footballer, born 1994), British footballer
- Lewis Jones (rugby, born 1931), (1931–2024) Welsh rugby union and rugby league footballer of the 1940s, 1950s and 1960s
- Lewis Jones (rugby union, born 1992), Welsh rugby union scrum-half
- Lewis Jones (rugby union, born 2002), Welsh rugby union lock
- Lewis Jones (NASCAR), NASCAR driver who won in relief of Bob Welborn

== Others ==
- Lewis Jones (bishop) (1542–1646), bishop of Killaloe
- Lewis Jones (Patagonia) (1836–1904), one of the founders of the Welsh settlement in Patagonia who gave his name to the town of Trelew
- Lewis Jones (Royal Navy officer) (1797–1895)
- Lewis Jones (writer) (1897–1939), Welsh writer
- Lewis Bevel Jones III (1926–2018), American bishop of the United Methodist Church
- Brian Jones (Lewis Brian Hopkin Jones, 1942–1969), English musician, founder of the Rolling Stones
- Lewis Ralph Jones (1864–1945), American botanist and agricultural biologist
- Lewis Wade Jones (1910–1979), American sociologist and educator
- Lewis Webster Jones (1899–1975), American economist
- Lewis Vaughan Jones (born 1981), Welsh journalist and television news presenter

== See also ==
- Louis Jones (disambiguation)
