= Lily-white movement =

19th-century Republican anti-African-American movement

Norris Wright Cuney, the first African-American chairman of the Republican Party of Texas

The Lily-White Movement was an anti-Black political movement within the Republican Party in the United States in the late 19th and early 20th centuries. It was a response to the political and socioeconomic gains made by African Americans following the Civil War and the Thirteenth Amendment to the Constitution, which eliminated slavery and involuntary servitude ("except as punishment for a crime").

During Reconstruction, Black leaders in the South gained influence in the Republican Party by organizing Black people as an important voting bloc via Union Leagues and the biracial Black-and-tan faction of the Republicans. Conservative Whites attempted to eliminate this influence and recover White voters who had defected to the Democratic Party. The Lily-White Movement proved successful throughout the South and was a key factor in the growth of the Republican Party in the region.

== Terminology ==
Black Texas Republican leader Norris Wright Cuney introduced the term "Lily-White Movement" in an address to an 1888 state Republican convention to describe efforts by White conservatives to oust Black people from positions of Texas Republican leadership and incite riots to divide the party.

The term came to be used nationally to describe this ongoing movement as it further developed in the early 20th century.

== Background ==
Immediately following the war, all the Southern states enacted "Black Codes," laws intended specifically to curtail the rights of the newly freed African Americans. Many Northern states enacted their own "Black Codes" restricting or barring Black immigration. The Civil Rights Act of 1866, however, nullified most of these laws, and the federal Freedmen's Bureau managed to regulate many of the affairs of Southern Black men, who were granted the right to vote in 1867. Groups such as the Union League and the Radical Republicans sought total equality and complete integration of Black people into American society. The Republican Party itself held significant power in the South during Reconstruction because of the federal government's role.

During Reconstruction, Union Leagues were formed across the South after 1867 as all-Black working auxiliaries of the Republican Party. They were secret organizations that mobilized freedmen to register to vote and to vote Republican. They discussed political issues, promoted civic projects, and mobilized workers opposed to certain employers. Most branches were segregated, but a few were integrated. Most of the leaders of the all-Black units were urban Black Northerners who had never been enslaved. Historian Eric Foner reports:

By the end of 1867 it seemed that virtually every black voter in the south had enrolled in the Union League, the Loyal League, or some equivalent local political organization. Meetings were generally held in a black church or school.

— Eric Foner, Black Leaders of the Nineteenth Century

During the 19th century, a small number of African Americans were elected to the United States Congress; all were members of the Republican Party. In the South, the party was a voting coalition of Freedmen (freed slaves), Carpetbaggers (derogatory term used by Southern Whites for recent arrivals from the North), and Scalawags (derogatory term describing those Southern Whites who had been loyal to the US during the Civil War). In the South, the Republican Party gradually came to be known as "the party of the Negro." In Texas, Black People comprised 90% of the party members during the 1880s.

Growing numbers of Whites came to consider the Democratic Party to be the party of respectability. The first Ku Klux Klan targeted violence against Black Republican leaders and seriously undercut the Union League.

== Republican factionalism ==
Black Republicans increasingly demanded more and more offices at the expense of the Scalawags. The more numerous Black-and-Tan element typically won the factional battles; many Scalawags joined the opposing Lily-Whites or switched to the Democrats.

Following the death of Texas Republican leader Edmund J. Davis in 1883, Black civil rights leader Norris Wright Cuney rose to the Republican chairmanship in Texas, becoming a national committeeman in 1889. While Black Americans were a minority overall in Texas, Cuney's rise to this position caused a backlash among White conservative Republicans in other areas, leading to the Lily-Whites becoming a more organized, nationwide effort. Cuney himself coined the term "Lily-White Movement" to describe rapidly intensifying organized efforts by White conservatives to oust Black Republicans from positions of party leadership and incite riots to divide the party. Some authors contend that the effort was coordinated with Democrats as part of a larger movement toward disenfranchisement of Black people in the South by increasing restrictions in voter registration rules.

== Downfall of Black Republicans ==
By 1890, with a few brief exceptions, the Democratic Party had gained control of all state legislatures in the South. From 1890 to 1908, Southern states accomplished disenfranchisement of Black people and—in some states—many poor White people.

From 1901 through 1928, no Black people served in the U.S. Congress due to their disenfranchisement across the South. (In 1928, Oscar De Priest was elected US Representative from Illinois.) Black leaders were barred in 1922 from the Virginia Republican Congressional Convention; the state had imposed racial segregation in public places and disenfranchised most Black people by this time.

At the national level, the Republican Party tried fitfully to respond to Black interests. The platform adopted at the 1920 Republican National Convention included a plank that called for an end to lynching. Lynchings of Black women and men in the South had increased in the decades around the turn of the 20th century. Leonidas C. Dyer, a White Republican Representative from St. Louis, Missouri, worked with the NAACP to introduce an anti-lynching bill into the House, where he gained strong passage in 1922. One of the black-and-tan partisans who continued to hold appointed office was Walter L. Cohen of New Orleans, Louisiana, the customs inspector and later comptroller of customs. He gained appointments from four Republican presidents and continued in office through the Calvin Coolidge administration.

During the NAACP national convention in 1926, the delegates expressed their disappointment with the party:

Our political salvation and our social survival lie in our absolute independence of party allegiance in politics and the casting of our vote for our friends and against our enemies whoever they may be and whatever party labels they carry.

— NAACP, 1926 Convention

== Aftermath ==
Lily-White/Black-and-Tan factionalism flared up in 1928, when Herbert Hoover tried to appeal to upper-class Southern Whites; and again in 1932 as the New Deal coalition built by Franklin D. Roosevelt and the pro-civil rights voice of Eleanor Roosevelt began to attract African-American voters to the Democratic Party. Due to Harry S. Truman's proposal for comprehensive civil rights legislation and his anti-segregationist policies, and for support for the civil rights movement and Congressional passage of the Civil Rights Act of 1964 and the Voting Rights Act of 1965 under Lyndon B. Johnson, the shift of African Americans toward Democratic candidates accelerated.

According to academic Michael K. Fauntroy, the Lily-White Movement is one of the darkest and most "under-examined [eras] of American Republicanism".

== Important figures ==
Lily-White leaders:

- James P. Newcomb, Republican secretary of state of Texas between 1870 and 1874, journalist, and longtime influential Texas party leader.
- Jeter C. Pritchard, Republican U.S. senator from western North Carolina between 1895 and 1903.
- William Howard Taft, Republican president between 1909 and 1913, sought to expand Republican appeal in the South by eliminating Black involvement.
- Herbert Hoover, Republican president between 1929 and 1933, had alliances with Black leaders, but broke with them in 1928 to gain Lily-White support in the South.

Leading opponents:

- Booker T. Washington, president of Tuskegee Institute in Alabama, had close ties to leading Republicans and was a force in Black politics.

== See also ==
- Black-and-tan faction
- Black suffrage in the United States
- Civil rights movement (1896–1954)
- Dixiecrat
- Nadir of American race relations
- Norris Wright Cuney
- Southern strategy
