= Louis (Blues Boy) Jones =

American singer (1931–1984)

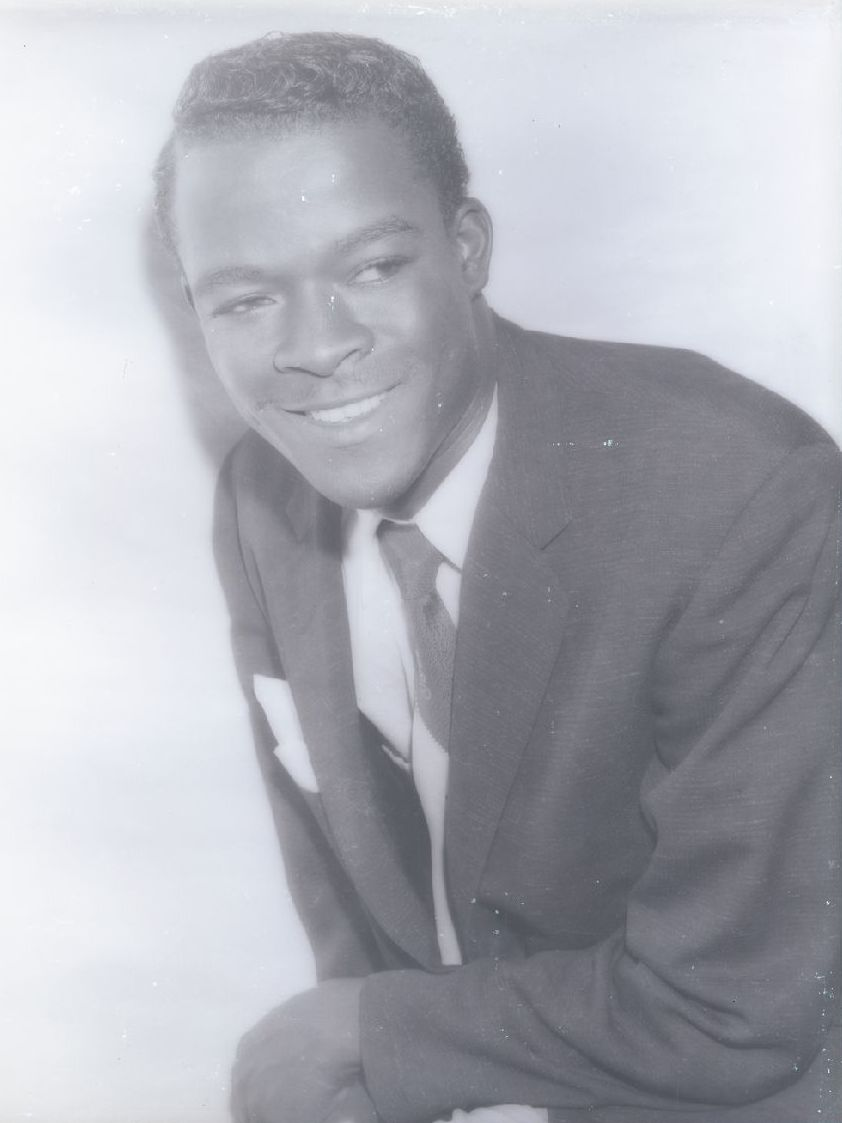
- Publicity photo of Louis Prince Jones, Jr.

Background information
- Also known as: Louis Prince
- Born: Louis Prince Jones, Jr. April 28, 1931; Galveston, Texas, United States
- Died: June 27, 1984 (aged 53)
- Genres: R&B, soul
- Occupation(s): Singer, songwriter
- Instrument(s): Vocalist, piano
- Years active: 1956–1970s
- Labels: Peacock, Decca, Enjoy, Sabra

Louis Prince Jones, Jr. (April 28, 1931 – June 27, 1984), credited as Louis Jones or Louis (Blues Boy) Jones, was an American R&B singer, songwriter and musician who recorded in the 1950s and 1960s.

== Life ==
He was born in Galveston, Texas, the son of Rebecca Prince Jackson and Louis Jones, Sr. He began singing with his mother in their church choir, and learned to play piano and drums. After attending Central High School in Galveston, he served as a medic with the US Army during the Korean War under the name Louis Prince, and worked as a longshoreman and shipyard worker. In the early 1950s he moved to Houston to live with his brother, and soon began singing backing vocals on recordings produced by Don Robey at Peacock Records.

Jones made his first recording, "Rock and Roll Bells", for Peacock in 1956. Billboard described the song as "a new R&B gimmick that should occasion a lot of interest. The shouter hears tinkling bells and acts as if he is going mad. The unusual backing carries the spirit thru effectively..." The record was one of the 26 discs included in Elvis Presley's first record collection, sold at auction in 2010. Jones also worked as a backup singer on many of Robey's productions for the Peacock and Duke labels in the late 1950s, including recordings by Bobby "Blue" Bland and "Big Mama" Thornton.

He performed and toured with the Bobby Scott Orchestra, and sang back-up for singer Maxine Brown, playing in New York City and in a residency in Bermuda. His recording career continued in the early 1960s. When in New York in 1963 he recorded "The Birds Is Coming" for Decca Records – adopting the movie company's advertising slogan for Alfred Hitchcock's film The Birds – and also recorded a version of Ray Charles' "I Believe to My Soul", on Bobby Robinson's Enjoy label. Returning to Texas, he recorded his own songs "Come on Home" and "I'll Be Your Fool" for Lelan Rogers' Houston-based Sabra label.

Jones was married twice. He died in 1984 at the age of 53, following a stroke the previous year, and was buried in Lakeview Cemetery in Galveston. His reputation as a "great R&B singer" grew after his death, and most of his recordings are available on YouTube.

== Discography ==
- "Rock and Roll Bells" / "All Over, Goodbye" (Peacock 1663)
- "The Birds Is Coming" / "That's Cuz I Love You" (Decca 31500)
- "I Believe to My Soul" / "Hurry Baby" (Enjoy 2009)
- "I'll Be Your Fool" / "Someway, Somewhere" (Sabra 519)
- "Come On Home" / "I Cried" (Sabra 524)
