= Louise Jones (artist) =

Chinese-American mural artist (born 1988)

Louise Jones (née Chen, born in 1988), previously professionally as Ouizi, is a Chinese-American mural artist known for her large floral murals located in urban, public spaces (museums and public parks) throughout the United States.

== Early life ==
Jones was born in Santa Monica, California and was raised in Los Angeles by her Shanghainese parents. She attended the University of California, Santa Cruz, where she studied drawing and printmaking.

== Career ==
Jones began working on murals in 2014.

Her murals often depict native plants and animals, and informed by her education in drawing and printmaking. She has also painted murals inspired by Chinese-American and Chinese culture.

She installed murals in Arkansas, California, Indiana, Michigan, New York, and Ohio, and also in New Zealand and Shanghai. She has painted more than 40 murals in Detroit.

In 2018 Jones was named artist-in-residence for the 2018Movement Electronic Music Festival, a Detroit festival.

== Personal life ==
She has lived and worked in Detroit since 2014.
