= Star of the Republic Museum =

Coordinates: 30.3239°N 96.1537°W

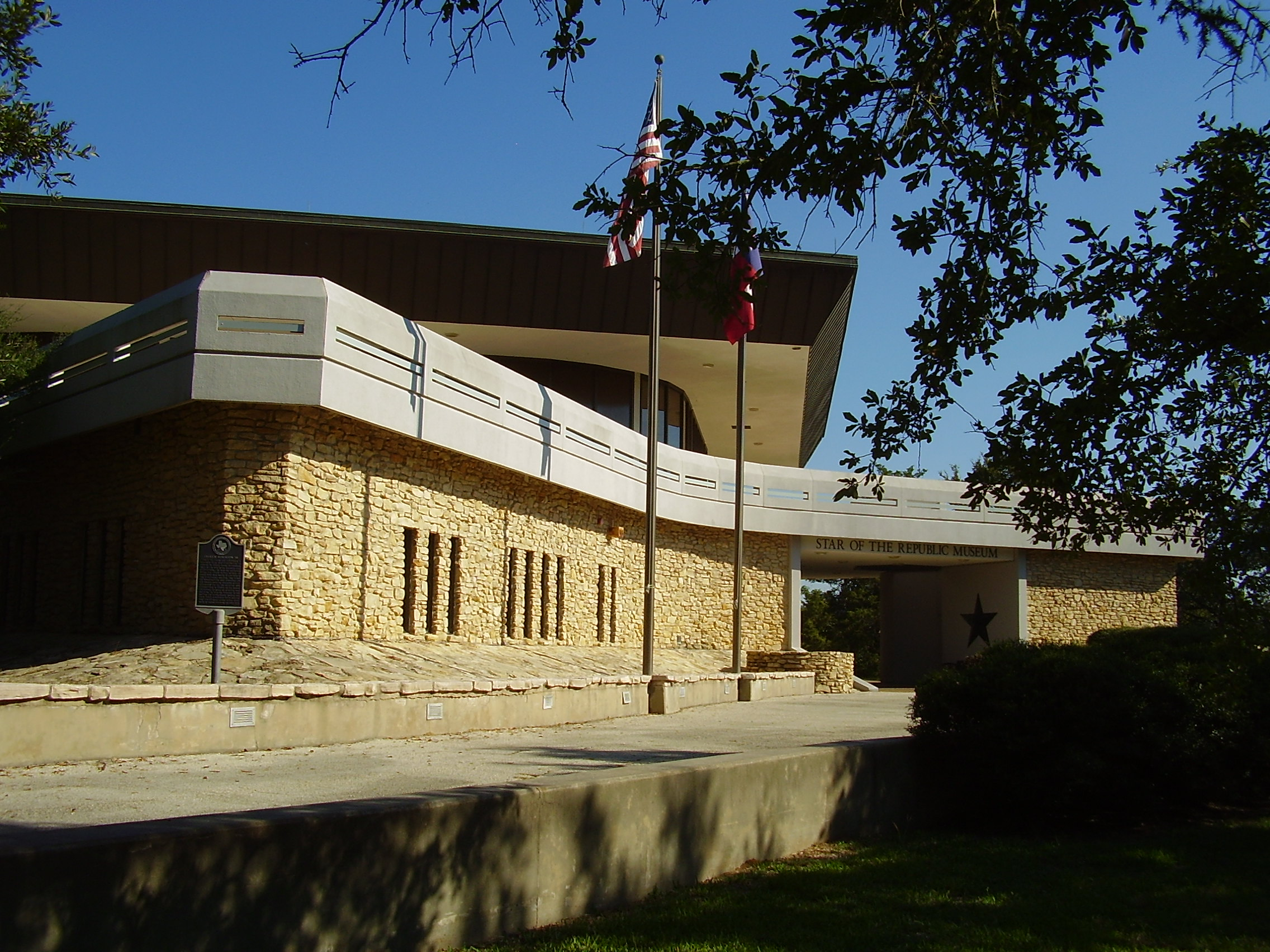
Star of the Republic Museum.

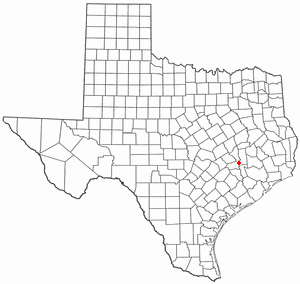
Location of Washington on the Brazos, Texas.

The Star of the Republic Museum, in Washington, Texas, United States, is the only museum in the state of Texas created specifically to collect and interpret the culture and history of the Republic of Texas from 1836 to 1846. Within the museum's two floors of exhibits, visitors can learn about the history of the time period through media experiences, as well as informative exhibits. The site of the Star of the Republic Museum was selected at Washington on the Brazos where elected delegates gathered on March 2, 1836, to declare Texas’ independence from Mexico.

== Mission ==
The Star of the Republic Museum was created by the Texas Legislature and is administered by Blinn College as a cultural and educational institution. Its purpose is to collect and preserve the material culture of the Texas Republic (1836–1846) and to interpret the history, cultures, diversity, and values of early Texans. The museum strives to inspire interest, understanding and appreciation of Texas heritage for students, teachers, scholars, and the general public through exhibits, tours, programs, web activities, and outreach.

== History ==
In 1969, the State of Texas created the Star of the Republic Museum through House Bill No. 634, of the Sixty-first Texas Legislature. The museum officially opened on Texas Independence Day, March 2, 1970 and was transferred from the Texas Parks and Wildlife Department to Blinn College, located in Brenham, Texas. In 1972, the Star of the Republic Museum achieved accreditation from the American Alliance of Museums. As an accredited facility, the museum is certified in adhering to the standards set forth by the museum profession, providing quality service to the public, and maintaining the collections in a responsible manner. Of the approximate 8,500 museums in the nation, only around 800 are accredited. In 1992 the museum began a long-range plan for major facility renovations. The plans included renovations to the building, a building addition, and renovations to the museum's exhibits. Through the efforts of this plan, The Republic of Texas exhibition was finished in 2002. This permanent exhibit allows visitors to view over 1,000 objects from the collection depicting the culture of early 19th century Texas.

== Exhibits ==
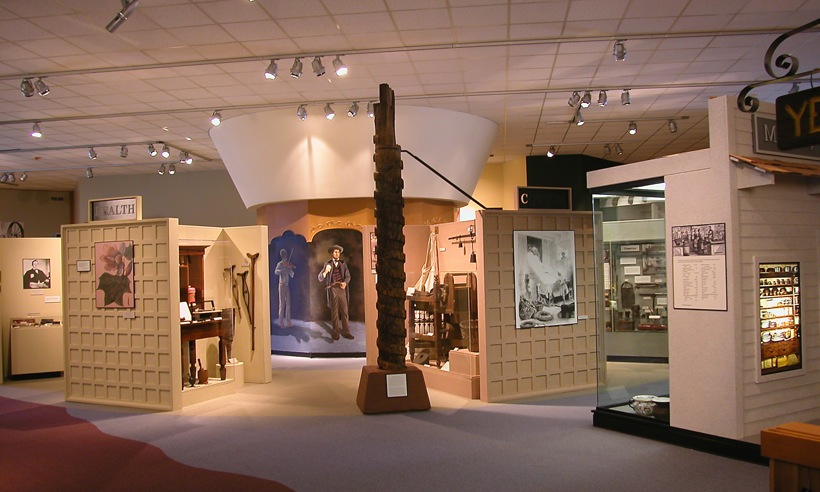
Star of the Republic Museum Exhibits.

The museum's exhibits are displayed on two floors, the first of which is in the shape of a five-point Texas star and the second floor in a pentagon shape. The exhibits on the first floor present a chronological history of early Texas, beginning with the first Texans, the Native Americans, and continuing to the Texian soldiers who fought for Texas independence. Intriguing artifacts on the first level include: The Reading of the Texas Declaration of Independence, a 1936 painting by Charles and Fanny Normann of the men who signed the Texas Declaration of Independence and the Lone Star Flag, the oldest known Texas flag from the period of 1839–1846. Personal artifacts once belonging to signers of the Texas Declaration of Independence also comprise a significant portion of the first floor exhibits. The second floor exhibits depict the social and multicultural history of the 1830s and 1840s. Through impressive design, the exhibits portray the daily life and practices of the settlers of the Republic of Texas. The second level's attractions include: a simulated riverboat trip down the Brazos River and an observation deck to view the 300 acres (1.2 km^{2}) of the Washington on the Brazos State Historic Site.

== Annual events ==
Texas Independence Day Celebration

The largest event for the entire park is the Texas Independence Day Celebration. This celebration occurs every year on the weekend closest to March 2, the actual anniversary of Texas Independence from Mexico. During the celebration weekend visitors are able to tour all the sites in the park free of charge. During the Texas Independence Day celebration visitors will find costumed interpreters, historical re-enactors, special performances, and a variety of demonstrators relating to the Republic of Texas time period. Next year's Texas Independence Celebration will be held on Saturday, March 2, and Sunday, March 3, 2019.

Juneteenth Heritage Celebration

On the 19th of June 1865, Union General Gordon Granger arrived in Galveston and made a declaration of freedom ending the bondage of approximately 250,000 enslaved men, women and children in Texas. Since that time, Juneteenth has been celebrated and remembered by picnics, parades, family reunions, pageants, barbecues and games. The Brazos Valley has a rich history in celebrating Juneteenth, including the Juneteenth parade in Brenham, TX, which began in the early 1870s and continues to this day. Washington on the Brazos will observe this important occasion with its Juneteenth Heritage Celebration from 10 a.m. to 4:30 p.m. on Saturday, June 23, 2018, at the park. This family friendly event will include artifact exhibits; music; art displays; prominent guest speakers and historians; church choir performances; food.

Christmas on the Brazos

Begin the holiday season by spending special time at Washington on the Brazos. Activities commence in the early afternoon at Independence Hall and the Star of the Republic Museum and extend into the evening, bringing an 1850s Christmas alive for all. The highlight of the celebration is Candlelight Christmas, from 5:30 p.m. – 9 p.m. at Barrington Living History Farm. Meet St. Nick; fall in with some noisy, rowdy revelers; experience the Jones family lighting the Christmas tree; attend an evening service with a traveling minister; and discover how the enslaved people celebrated Christmas. Allow at least one hour to complete the full experience, reservations are highly recommended.

== Location ==
The Star of the Republic Museum is one of three venues located within the Washington on the Brazos State Historic Site in Washington, Texas. The other two venues located on the Washington-on-the-Brazos State Historic Site are Independence Hall where the Texas Declaration of Independence from Mexico was signed in 1836; and Barrington Living History Farm, the home of Anson Jones, the last president of the Republic of Texas. The Washington on the Brazos State Historic Site is located in Washington County, Texas. The Star of the Republic Museum is located at 23200 Park Road 12, Washington, Texas.

== Descendants of the signers ==
Beginning in 2010, the Star of the Republic Museum established a registry of documented lineal descendants of the 60 signers of the Texas Declaration of Independence. 59 of these men were elected delegates to the Convention of 1836. Herbert S. Kimble, though not a delegate to the Convention, signed the Texas Declaration of Independence in his capacity as Convention secretary. The signers of the Texas Declaration of Independence were:

- Jesse B. Badgett, Delegate from Municipality of Bejar
- George Washington Barnett, Delegate from Municipality of Washington
- Thomas Barnett, Delegate from Municipality of Austin
- Stephen W. Blount, Delegate from Municipality of San Augustine
- John W. Bower, Delegate from Municipality of San Patricio
- Asa Brigham, Delegate from Municipality of Brazoria
- Andrew Briscoe, Delegate from Municipality of Harrisburg
- John Wheeler Bunton, Delegate from Municipality of Mina
- John S. D. Byrom, Delegate from Municipality of Brazoria
- Mathew Caldwell, Delegate from Municipality of Gonzales
- Samuel Price Carson, Delegate from Municipality of Red River
- George C. Childress, Delegate from Municipality of Milam
- William Clark Jr., Delegate from Municipality of Sabine
- Robert M. Coleman, Delegate from Municipality of Mina
- James Collinsworth, Delegate from Municipality of Brazoria
- Edward Conrad, Delegate from Municipality of Refugio
- William Carroll Crawford, Delegate from Municipality of Shelby
- Lorenzo de Zavala, Delegate from Municipality of Harrisburg
- Richard Ellis, President of the Convention; Delegate from Municipality of Pecan Point
- Stephen H. Everett, Delegate from Municipality of Jasper
- John Fisher, Delegate from Municipality of Gonzales
- Samuel Rhoads Fisher, Delegate from the Municipality of Matagorda
- Robert Thomas 'James' Gaines, Delegate from Municipality of Sabine
- Thomas J. Gazley, Delegate from Municipality of Mina
- Benjamin Briggs Goodrich, Delegate from Municipality of Washington
- Jesse Grimes, Delegate from Municipality of Washington
- Robert Hamilton, Delegate from Municipality of Pecan Point
- Bailey Hardeman, Delegate Municipality of Matagorda
- Augustine B. Hardin, Delegate Municipality of Liberty
- Sam Houston, Delegate from Municipality of Refugio
- William D. Lacy, Delegate from Municipality of Colorado
- Albert Hamilton Latimer, Delegate from Municipality of Pecan Point
- Edwin O. Legrand, Delegate from Municipality of San Augustine
- Collin McKinney, Delegate from Municipality of Pecan Point
- Samuel A. Maverick, Delegate from Municipality of Bejar
- Michel B. Menard, Delegate from Municipality of Liberty
- William Menefee, Delegate from Municipality of Colorado
- John W. Moore, Delegate of Municipality of Harrisburg
- William Motley, Delegate from Municipality of Goliad
- José Antonio Navarro, Delegate from Municipality of Bejar
- Martin Parmer, Delegate from Municipality of San Augustine
- Sydney O. Pennington, Delegate from Municipality of Shelby
- Robert Potter, Delegate from Municipality of Nacogdoches
- James Power, Delegate from Municipality of Refugio
- John S. Roberts, Delegate from Municipality of Nacogdoches
- Sterling C. Robertson, Delegate from Municipality of Milam
- José Francisco Ruiz, Delegate from Municipality of Bejar
- Thomas Jefferson Rusk, Delegate from Municipality of Nacogdoches
- William. B. Scates, Delegate from Municipality of Jefferson
- George W. Smyth, Delegate from Municipality of Jasper
- Elijah Stapp, Delegate from Municipality of Jackson
- Charles B. Stewart, Delegate from Municipality of Austin
- James G. Swisher, Delegate from Municipality of Washington
- Charles S. Taylor, Delegate from Municipality of Nacogdoches
- David Thomas, Delegate from Municipality of Refugio
- John Turner, Delegate from Municipality of San Patricio
- Edwin Waller, Delegate from Municipality of Brazoria
- Claiborne West, Delegate from Municipality of Jefferson
- James B. Woods, Delegate from Municipality of Liberty
- Herbert Simms Kimble, Secretary of the Convention
