= 1st Congress of the Republic of Texas =

First Congress, Republic of Texas

2nd Congress of the Republic of Texas	→
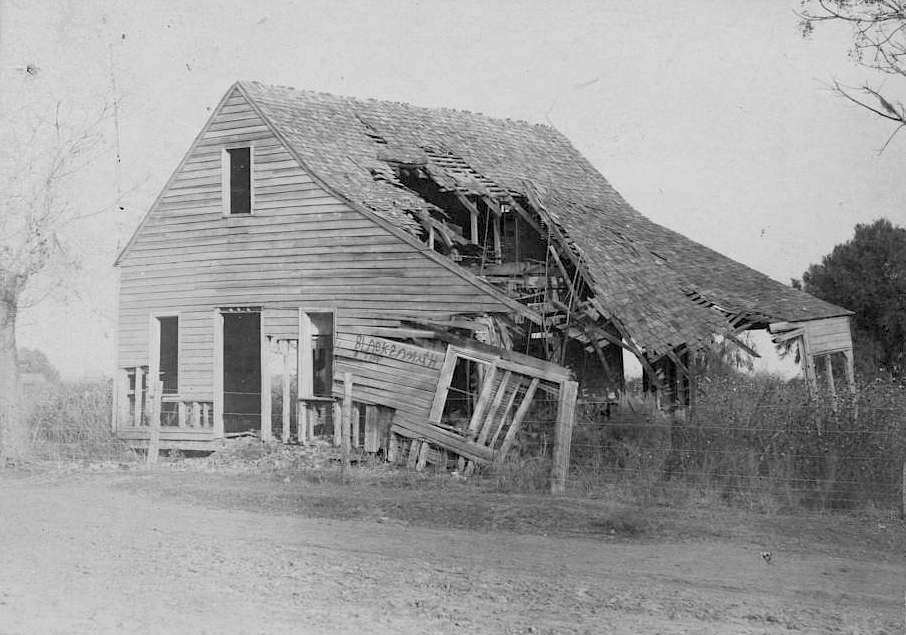
- The building that housed the House of Representatives of the Republic of Texas in Columbia (shown c. 1897)

Overview
- Legislative body: Congress of the Republic of Texas
- Jurisdiction: Republic of Texas
- Meeting place: Columbia and Houston
- Term: October 3, 1836 – June 13, 1837

House of Representatives
- Members: 31 Representatives
- House Speaker: Ira Ingram (1st session); Branch T. Archer (2nd session)

Senate
- Members: 14 Senators
- Senate President: Mirabeau Lamar
- Senate President pro tem.: Richard Ellis (1st session); Jesse Grimes (2nd session)

Sessions
- 1st: October 3, 1836 – December 22, 1836
- 2nd: May 1, 1837 – June 13, 1837

The First Congress of the Republic of Texas, consisting of the Senate of the Republic of Texas and House of Representatives of the Republic of Texas, met in Columbia at two separate buildings (one for each chamber) and then in Houston at the present-day site of The Rice from October 3, 1836, to June 13, 1837, during the first year of Sam Houston's presidency.

All members of Congress were officially non-partisan. According to the Constitution of the Republic of Texas of 1836, each member of the House of Representatives was elected for a term of one year. Each county was guaranteed at least one representative.

Each Senator was elected for a three-year term to represent a district that each had a nearly equal portion of the nation's population. Each district could have no more than one Senator.

== Members ==
=== Senate ===
- José Francisco Ruiz – District of Bexar
- James Collinsworth – District of Brazoria (1st session)
- William Green Hill – District of Brazoria (2nd session)
- Alexander Somervell – District of Colorado and Austin counties
- Edwin Morehouse – District of Goliad, Refugio, and San Patricio
- Robert Wilson –District of Harrisburg and Liberty
- Stephen H. Everitt – District of Jasper and Jefferson
- Albert Clinton Horton – District of Matagorda, Victoria, and Jackson
- Sterling C. Robertson – District of Milam
- James S. Lester – District of Mina and Gonzales
- Robert Anderson Irion – District of Nacogdoches
- Richard Ellis – District of Red River
- Shelby Corzine – District of San Augustine (1st session)
- Henry William Augustine – District of San Augustine (2nd session)
- Willis H. Landrum – District of Shelby and Sabine
- Jesse Grimes – District of Washington

=== House of Representatives ===
==== Austin County ====
- Moseley Baker

==== Bexar County ====
- Thomas Green

==== Brazoria County ====
- Branch T. Archer, from October 4, 1836
- John A. Wharton, from October 4, 1836

==== Colorado County ====
- John Gallimore Robison

==== Goliad County ====
- John M. Chenoweth

==== Gonzales County ====
- William S. Fisher

==== Harrisburg County ====
- John W. Moore, until October 11, 1836 (Note: Resigned upon evidence presented that he was not duly elected)
  - Jesse H. Cartwright, from October 11, 1836

==== Jackson County ====
- Samuel A. White

==== Jasper County ====
- Col. Samuel S. Lewis

==== Jefferson County ====
- Claiborne West

==== Liberty County ====
- Edward Thomas Branch

==== Mina County ====
- John Wheeler Bunton
- Jesse Billingsley

==== Matagorda County ====
- Ira Ingram, 1st session*
  - Daniel Davis D. Baker, 2nd session

==== Milam County ====
- Francis Marcus Weatherred, Jr., until October 31, 1836
  - Samuel Tabor Allen, from October 31, 1836

==== Nacogdoches County ====
- John Kirby Allen
- Haden Edwards, 1st session
  - Hayden S. Arnold, 2nd session

==== Refugio County ====
- Elkanah Brush

==== Red River County ====
- Mansell Walter Matthews
- George Washington Wright
- William Becknell, until October 13, 1836
  - Collin McKinney, from October 13, 1836

==== Sabine County ====
- John Boyd

==== San Augustine County ====
- William W. Holman
- Joseph Rowe

==== San Patricio County ====
- John Turner, until October 20, 1836
  - John Geraghty, from October 20, 1836

==== Shelby County ====
- Richard Hooper
- Sydney Oswald Penington

==== Victoria County ====
- Richard Roman

==== Washington County ====
- William Warner Hill
- W. W. Gant, from October 21, 1836

== Standing committees ==
=== Senate ===
- Ways and Means
- Judiciary
- Post Office and Post Roads
- State of the Republic
- Military Affairs
- Roads, Bridges, and Ferries
- Claims and Accounts
- Public Lands
- Indian Affairs
- County Boundaries
- Naval Affairs

=== House of Representatives ===
- Ways and Means
- Judiciary
- Post Office
- State of the Republic
- Military Affairs
- Roads, Bridges, and Ferries
- Claims and Accounts
- Public Lands
- Indian and Indian Affairs
- County Boundaries
- Naval Affairs
- Foreign Relations

== Employees ==
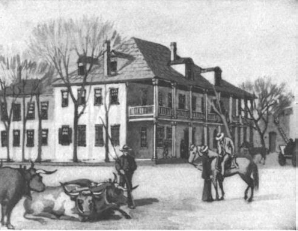
Texas Capitol at Houston

=== Senate ===
- Sergeant at Arms – William King (1st session), Noah T. Byars (2nd session)
- Clerk – Richardson A. Scurry (1st session), Arthur Robertson (2nd session)
- Doorkeeper – Joshua Canter (1st session), Marshall Mann (2nd session)

=== House of Representatives ===
- Sergeant at Arms – A. L. Harrison (1st session), George S. Stratton (2nd session)
- Clerk – Willis A. Farris (1st session), William Fairfax Gray (2nd session)
- Doorkeeper – W. T. Hendricks (1st session), Abner S. McDonald (2nd session), S. L. Johnson (2nd session)
