= Constitution of Texas =

American state constitution

Constitution of the State of Texas
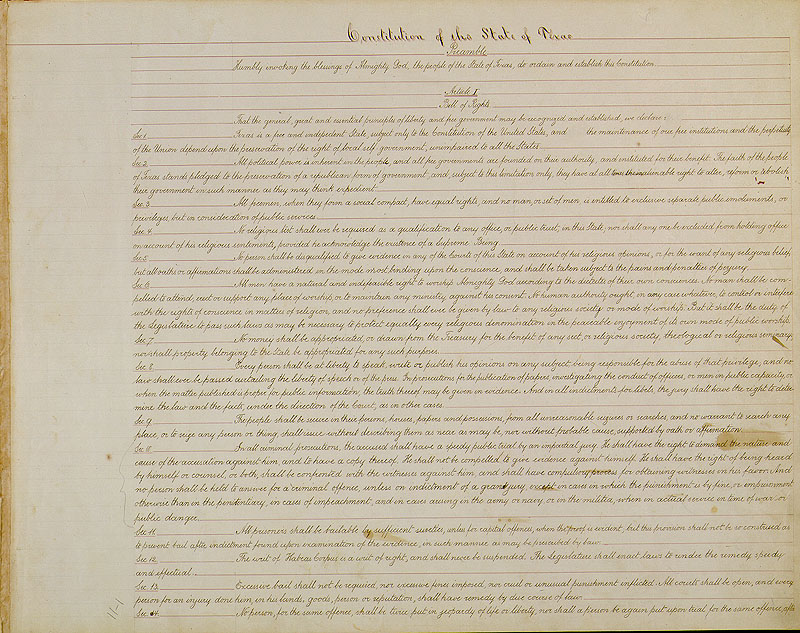
- The opening of the hand-written Texas Constitution of 1876

Overview
- Jurisdiction: State of Texas
- Subordinate to: Constitution of the United States

Government structure
- Branches: 3
- Chambers: Bicameral
- Executive: Governor
- Judiciary: Supreme, Districts

Full text
- Constitution of Texas (2022) at Wikisource

Flag of Texas.

Seal of Texas.

Map of the State of Texas

Map of the State of Texas within the United States of America

The Constitution of the State of Texas is the document that establishes the structure and function of the government of the U.S. state of Texas and enumerates the basic rights of its citizens. The current document was adopted on February 15, 1876, and is the seventh constitution in Texas history. The previous six were adopted in 1827 (while Texas was still part of Mexico and half of the state of Coahuila y Tejas), 1836 (the Constitution of the Republic of Texas), 1845 (upon admission to the United States), 1861 (at the beginning of the American Civil War), 1866 (at the end of the American Civil War), and 1869. Texas constitutional conventions took place in 1861, 1866, 1868–69, and 1875.

The constitution is the second-longest state constitution in the United States (exceeded only by the Constitution of Alabama) and is also the third-most amended state constitution (only the Alabama and California constitutions have been amended more often). From 1876 to 2024 (following the 88th Legislature), the Texas Legislature proposed 714 constitutional amendments. Of that total, 530 were approved by the electorate, 181 were defeated, and 3 never made it on the ballot. Most of the amendments are due to the document's highly restrictive nature: the constitution stipulates that the state of Texas has only those powers explicitly granted to it; there is no counterpart of the federal Necessary and Proper Clause.

As with many state constitutions, it explicitly provides for the separation of powers and incorporates its bill of rights directly into the text of the constitution (as Article I). The bill of rights is considerably lengthier and more detailed than the federal Bill of Rights, and includes some provisions not included in the federal Constitution.

== Articles of the Texas Constitution of 1876 ==
=== Preamble ===
Humbly invoking the blessings of Almighty God, the people of the State of Texas do ordain and establish this Constitution.

— Constitution of Texas, preamble

=== Article 1: "Bill of Rights" ===
Article 1 of the Texas Constitution serves as its bill of rights. Originally composed of 29 sections, five additional sections have since been added. Several of these provisions outline specific, fundamental limitations on the power of the state government. Importantly, the protections offered by the Texas Bill of Rights apply solely to actions by the Texas government. However, many protections found in the U.S. Constitution are also applied to state governments through the Due Process Clause of the Fourteenth Amendment.

==== Differences with the U.S. Bill of Rights ====
While the Texas Bill of Rights includes many rights similar to those found in the U.S. Bill of Rights, it is notably more detailed and contains several provisions that are unique to Texas.

- Section 6-a mentions the state of Texas does not have the right to prohibit or limit any assembly of people who congregate and exercise their right to religious freedom. (Added, November 2, 2021).
- Section 11d states that bail will be denied by judges in cases of violent and/or sexual offence cases where clear evidence shows that the person in question poses a danger or may be a flight risk.
- Section 12 recognizes the writ of habeas corpus as an unqualified right and prohibits its suspension under any circumstances. This differs from the U.S. Constitution, which allows suspension “in Cases of Rebellion or Invasion when the public safety may require it.”
- Section 21 prohibits both corruption of blood and forfeiture of estates, including in cases of suicide. This expands upon the U.S. Constitution's Article III, Section 3, which limits such forfeitures to only during the life of the person convicted.
- Section 34 protects the right of the people to hunt, fish, and harvest wildlife, subject to regulations intended for wildlife conservation. The section explicitly clarifies that it does not alter any laws relating to trespassing, property rights, or eminent domain.
- Section 37 recognizes parental rights over their children in cases of care, custody, and control over said child's upbringing and rights for overall decisions made on behalf of the child at the parent's discretion.

==== Invalidated sections ====
- Section 32, added in 2005, prohibited state recognition of same-sex marriage. This section became legally unenforceable following the U.S. Supreme Court's decision in Obergefell v. Hodges, which recognized same-sex marriage as a constitutional right.
- Section 4 prohibits religious tests for public officeholders, yet it includes language requiring officeholders to “acknowledge the existence of a Supreme Being.” While this section has not been invalidated by the Texas Legislature or directly overturned by the U.S. Supreme Court, it may be legally vulnerable under federal precedent. A similar clause was struck down in Silverman v. Campbell in South Carolina.

==== Other rights ====
- Section 11 guarantees that individuals detained before trial are eligible for bail by sufficient sureties, with exceptions for capital offenses and other limited circumstances defined by law.

=== Article 2: "The Powers of Government" ===
Article 2 provides for the separation of powers of the legislative, executive, and judicial branches of the state government, prohibiting any branch from encroaching on the powers of the others.

=== Article 3: "Legislative Department" ===
Article 3 vests the legislative power of the state in the "Legislature of the State of Texas", consisting of the state's Senate and House of Representatives. It also lists the qualifications required of senators and representatives and regulates many details of the legislative process. The article (the longest in the constitution) contains many substantive limitations on the power of the legislature and a large number of exceptions to those limitations (notably in Sections 49-52 which discuss state limitations on debts, credit pledges, and grants, and limitations on sub-level governments for the same).

Two-thirds (2/3) of the elected members in either chamber constitutes a quorum to do business therein (Section 10), contrary to the provision for the United States Congress requiring only a majority (this larger requirement has resulted in occasions where a significant number of members from one political party, in an attempt to stop legislation, have in the past left the state so as to deny a quorum). A smaller number in each chamber is empowered to adjourn from day to day and compel the attendance of absent members.

As with the United States Constitution, either house may originate bills (Section 31), but bills to raise revenue must originate in the House of Representatives (Section 33).

Section 39 allows a bill to take effect immediately upon the Governor's signature if the bill passes both chambers by a two-thirds vote, unless otherwise specified in the bill. If the bill does not pass by this majority it takes effect on the first day of the next fiscal year (in Texas, the fiscal year runs from September 1 until the following August 31).

The largest Section within this article is Section 49 ("State Debts"), which includes 30 separate sub-sections (including two sub-sections both added in 2003 and both curiously numbered as "49-n", along with two other sub-sub-sections numbered "49-d-14"). Section 49 limits the power of the Legislature to incur debt to only specific purposes as stated in the Constitution; in order to allow the Legislature to incur debt for a purpose not stated numerous amendments to this section have had to be added and voted upon by the people.

In addition, Section 49a requires the Texas Comptroller of Public Accounts to certify, prior to the Legislature entering into its regular session, the amount of available cash on hand and anticipated revenues for the next biennium (officially titled the "Biennial Revenue Estimate" or "BRE"; the biennium covers the next two fiscal years beginning on September 1 of odd-numbered years and ending August 31 two years later); no appropriation may exceed this amount (except in cases of emergency, and then only with a four-fifths vote of both chambers), and the Comptroller is required to reject and return to the Legislature any appropriation in violation of this requirement.

Section 49-g (one of two such sections numbered as such, the other—now repealed—dealt with funding for the later-cancelled Superconducting Supercollider Project) created the state's "Rainy Day Fund" (technically called the "Economic Stabilization Fund").

=== Article 4: "Executive Department" ===
Article 4 describes the powers and duties of the Governor, Lieutenant Governor, Secretary of State, Comptroller, Commissioner of the General Land Office, and Attorney General. With the exception of the Secretary of State the above officials are directly elected in what is known as a "plural executive" system. (Although the Texas Agriculture Commissioner is also directly elected, that is the result of Legislative action, not a Constitutional requirement.)

The qualifications of the Governor of Texas is that he is at least thirty years of age, a citizen of the United States, and had resided in the State for at least five years preceding his election. The Governor is prohibited from holding any other office, whether civil, military or corporate, during his tenure in office, nor may he practice (or receive compensation for) any profession.

The Governor is the "Chief Executive Officer of the State" and the "Commander in Chief of the military forces of the State, except when they are called in actual service of the United States". He is vested with power to call forth the Militia, convene the Legislature for special session in extraordinary occasions, to execute the laws of the State, and to fill up vacancies not otherwise provided for by law, if consented to by two-thirds of the Senate. The Governor has a qualified negative on all bills passed by the Legislature, which may be overridden by two-thirds of both Houses of the Legislature by votes of the yeas and nays. Finally, the Secretary of State (who has the constitutional duty of keeping the Seal of the State) is appointed by the Governor, by and with the advice and consent of the Senate.

All commissions are signed by the Governor, being affixed with the State Seal and attested to by the Secretary of State.

Under Section 16 of this article, the Lieutenant Governor automatically assumes the power of Governor if and when the Governor travels outside of the state, or is subject to impeachment by the Texas House of Representatives.

=== Article 5: "Judicial Department" ===
Article 5 describes the composition, powers, and jurisdiction of the state's Supreme Court, Court of Criminal Appeals, and District, County, and Commissioners Courts, as well as the Justice of the Peace Courts.

=== Article 6: "Suffrage" ===
Article 6 denies voting rights to minors, felons, and people who are deemed mentally incompetent by a court (though the Legislature may make exceptions in the latter two cases). It also describes rules for elections.

Qualified voters are, except in treason, felony and breach of peace, privileged from arrest when attending at the polls, going and returning therefrom.

=== Article 7: "Education" ===
Article 7 establishes provisions for public schools, asylums, and universities. Section 1 states, "it shall be the duty of the Legislature of the State to establish and make suitable provision for the support and maintenance of an efficient system of public free schools". This issue has surfaced repeatedly in lawsuits involving the State's funding of education and the various restrictions it has placed on local school districts.

This Article also discusses the creation and maintenance of the Permanent University Fund (Sections 11, 11a, and 11b) and mandates the establishment of "a University of the first class" (Section 10) to be called The University of Texas, as well as "an Agricultural, and Mechanical department" (Section 13, today's Texas A&M University, which opened seven years prior); it also establishes Prairie View A&M University in Section 14. The University of Texas was originally created in the Constitution of 1858, and Texas A&M University was created from the Morrill Act. In 1915 and 1919, Constitutional Amendments were proposed to separate the two university systems, although both failed.

=== Article 8: "Taxation and Revenue" ===
Article 8 places various restrictions on the ability of the Legislature and local governments to impose taxes. Most of these restrictions concern local property taxes.

Section 1-e prohibits statewide property taxes. This Section has been the subject of numerous school district financing lawsuits claiming that other Legislative restrictions on local property taxes have created a de facto statewide property tax; the Texas Supreme Court has at times ruled that the restrictions did in fact do so (and thus were unconstitutional) and at other times ruled that they did not.

Texas has never had a personal income tax. In 2019, the constitution was amended to ban any future income tax, which has the effect of requiring a 2/3 majority of the legislature to repeal the ban. Previously, the requirement to pass any future income tax was passage by a statewide referendum, which requires a simple majority vote of the legislature to add the question to a referendum.

In May 2006 the Legislature replaced the existing franchise tax with a gross receipts tax.

=== Article 9: "Counties" ===
Article 9 provides rules for the creation of counties (now numbering 254) and for determining the location of county seats. It also includes several provisions regarding the creation of county-wide hospital districts in specified counties, as well as other miscellaneous provisions regarding airports and mental health.

=== Article 10: "Railroads" ===
Article 10 contains a single section declaring that railroads are considered "public highways" and railroad carriers "common carriers". Eight other sections were repealed in 1969.

=== Article 11: "Municipal Corporations" ===
Article 11 recognizes counties as legal political subunits of the State, grants certain powers to cities and counties, empowers the legislature to form school and other special districts.

Texas operates under Dustin's Rule: counties and non-school special districts are not granted home rule privileges, while cities and school districts have those privileges only in the limited instances specified below.

Sections 4 and 5 discuss the operation of cities based on population. Section 4 states that a city with a population of 5,000 or fewer has only those powers granted to it by general law; Section 5 permits a city, once its population exceeds 5,000, to adopt a charter under home rule provided the charter is not inconsistent with limits placed by the Texas Constitution or general law (the city may amend to maintain home rule status even if its population subsequently falls to 5,000 or fewer).

School districts may adopt home rule regardless of size, but none have chosen to do so.

=== Article 12: "Private Corporations" ===
Article 12 contains two sections directing the Legislature to enact general laws for the creation of private corporations and prohibiting the creation of private corporations by special law. Four other sections were repealed in 1969, and a fifth section in 1993.

=== Article 13: "Spanish and Mexican Land Titles" ===
Article 13 established provisions for Spanish and Mexican land titles from the Mexican War Era to please the Mexican government. This article was repealed in its entirety in 1969.

=== Article 14: "Public Lands and Land Office" ===
Article 14 contains a single section establishing the General Land Office (the office of Commissioner of the General Land Office is discussed under Article IV). Seven other sections were repealed in 1969.

=== Article 15: "Impeachment" ===
Article 15 describes the process of impeachment and lists grounds on which to impeach judges. The House of Representatives is granted the power of impeachment, while the Senate has power to try all impeachments.

No person may be convicted save by the consent of two-thirds of the Senators present, who have taken an oath or affirmation to impartially try the impeached. Judgement in impeachment cases does not extend beyond removal from office and disqualification from public office. The convicted individual remains subject to trial, indictment and punishment according to law.

All officers while subject to impeachment charges are suspended until the verdict by the Senate has been delivered.

=== Article 16: "General Provisions" ===
Article 16 contains miscellaneous provisions, including limits on interest rates, civil penalties for murder, and the punishment for bribery.

Section 14 All civil officers shall reside within the State; and all district or county officers within their districts or counties and shall keep their offices at such places as may be required by law; and failure to comply with this condition shall vacate the office's held.

Section 28 prohibits garnishment of wages, except for spousal maintenance and child support payments (however, this does not limit Federal garnishment for items such as student loan payments or income taxes).

Section 37 provides for the constitutional protection of the mechanic's lien.

Section 50 provides for protection of a homestead against forced sale to pay debts, except for foreclosure on debts related to the homestead (mortgage, taxes, mechanic's liens, and home equity loans including home equity lines of credit). This section also places specific restrictions on home equity loans and lines of credit (Texas being the last state to allow them), the section:

- limits the amount of a home equity loan, when combined with all other loans against a home, to no more than 80 percent of the home's fair market value at the time of the loan,
- requires that the advance on a home equity line of credit be at least $4,000 (even if the borrower wants to borrow less than that amount, though nothing prohibits a borrower from immediately repaying the credit line with a portion of said advance),
- requires a 14-day waiting period before any loan or line of credit is effective (at the initial borrowing; later borrowings against a line of credit can still be made in less time), and
- places restrictions on where closing can take place.

Although Texas is a right-to-work state, such protections are governed by law; the state does not have a constitutional provision related to right-to-work.

=== Article 17: "Mode of amending the Constitution of this State" ===
Notwithstanding the large number of amendments (and proposed amendments) that the Texas Constitution has had since its inception, the only method of amending the Constitution prescribed by Article 17 is via the Legislature, subject to voter approval. The Constitution does not provide for amendment by initiative or referendum, constitutional convention, or any other means. A 1974 constitutional convention required the voters to amend the Constitution to add a separate section to this Article; the section was later repealed in 1999.

The section also prescribes specific details for notifying the public of elections to approve amendments. It requires that the legislature publish a notice in officially approved newspapers that briefly summarizes each amendment and shows how each amendment will be described on the ballot. It also requires that the full text of each amendment be posted at each county courthouse at least 50 days (but no sooner than 60 days) before the election date.

Once an amendment passes it is compiled into the existing framework (i.e., text is either added or deleted), unlike the United States Constitution which does it separately.

== Attempts at revision ==
Because of the unwieldiness of the state constitution, there have been attempts to draft a new constitution or to significantly revise the existing one:

- The most successful of the attempts took place in 1969, when 56 separate obsolete provisions (including the entirety of Article 13, and 22 entire sections from Articles 10, 12, and 14) were successfully repealed.
- In 1971 the Texas Legislature placed on the November 1972 ballot an Amendment which called for the Legislature to meet in January 1974 for 90 days as a constitutional convention, for purposes of drafting a new state Constitution. The measure passed (thus adding Section 2 to Article 17; the section was later repealed in November 1999) and the Legislature met. However, even with an additional 60 days added to the session, the convention failed by a mere three votes to propose a new constitution.
- In 1975, the Legislature, meeting in regular session, revived much of the work of the 1974 convention and proposed it as a set of eight amendments to the existing constitution. All eight of the amendments were overwhelmingly rejected by the voters (in 250 of the state's 254 counties, all eight amendments were defeated; only in Duval and Webb counties did all eight amendments pass).
- In 1979 the Legislature placed on the ballot four amendments which had their origins in the 1974 convention; of which three were approved by the voters:
  - One amendment created a single property tax "appraisal district" in each county for purposes of providing a uniform appraised value for all property in a county applicable to all taxing authorities (previously, each taxing authority assessed property individually and frequently did so at dissimilar values between the authorities)
  - Another amendment gave to the Texas Court of Appeals criminal appellate jurisdiction (previously, the Courts had jurisdiction over civil matters only; though death penalty cases still bypass this level)
  - The last amendment gave the Governor of Texas limited authority to remove appointed statewide officials
- In 1995, Senator John Montford drafted a streamlined constitution similar to the 1974 version. However, Montford resigned his seat to become chancellor of the Texas Tech University System, and his initiative subsequently died. Later that year, though, voters approved an amendment abolishing the office of State Treasurer and moving its duties to the Texas Comptroller of Public Accounts office.
- In 1998, a bipartisan effort (led by Republican Senator Bill Ratliff and Democratic Representative Rob Junell) produced a rewritten constitution, with the help of students from Angelo State University (Junell's district included the San Angelo area). The second draft was submitted to the 76th Legislature, but failed to gain support in committee.

== History ==
On March 1, 1845, the U.S. Congress enacted a joint resolution proposing the annexation of Texas into the United States (Joint Resolution for annexing Texas to the United States, J.Res. 8, enacted March 1, 1845, 5 Stat. 797). On June 23, 1845, the Congress of the Republic of Texas accepted the resolution and gave its consent for President Anson Jones to call a convention scheduled for July 4, 1845. The convention convened on that date and almost unanimously approved an ordinance agreeing to annexation. After debating the terms through August 28, delegates adopted the Constitution of the State of Texas on August 27, 1845.[2] Texas voters approved both the annexation ordinance and the new state constitution in a referendum held on October 13, 1845. The U.S. Congress accepted the constitution and Texas was officially admitted into the Union on December 29, 1845, by another congressional joint resolution (Joint Resolution for the admission of the state of Texas into the Union, J.Res. 1, enacted December 29, 1845, 9 Stat. 108).

Following its secession from the Union in 1861 to join the Confederate States, Texas adopted a new constitution aligned with Confederate interests. After the Civil War, federal authorities required seceded states to create new governing documents before rejoining the Union. On June 17, 1865, President Andrew Johnson appointed Andrew Jackson Hamilton as the provisional governor of Texas and instructed him to organize a constitutional convention composed of loyal Unionists. The resulting convention proposed amendments, and a referendum was held on June 25, 1866, under the laws in force as of March 29, to ratify those changes.

Texas adopted the 1866 Constitution as a condition of rejoining the Union, re-establishing civil government and recognizing the end of slavery. However, due to dissatisfaction from Congress over the leniency of Texas's Reconstruction policies, further changes were required. Delegates met again in 1868–69, this time under the supervision of the U.S. military during Congressional Reconstruction. The resulting Constitution of 1869 expanded civil rights protections for formerly enslaved people and centralized power in the state government to help enforce federal Reconstruction policies (p. 57, Practicing Texas Politics, 2015).

In 1875, amid widespread discontent with the centralized authority and perceived excesses of the Reconstruction-era government, delegates met once more to draft a new state constitution. This constitutional convention was dominated by Democrats, many of whom were former Confederates seeking to restore local control and reduce government spending. The resulting document was ratified in 1876 and remains the foundation of Texas government today.

The Constitution of 1876 reflects a deeply rooted mistrust of government power. It imposed numerous limitations on state authority, fragmented executive power, and restricted the legislature's ability to act outside narrow boundaries. Over time, this restrictive design led to the need for frequent amendments to address emerging state needs.

Since its adoption, the 1876 Constitution has been amended over 500 times and remains one of the longest and most amended state constitutions in the U.S. Attempts to overhaul or replace it entirely have been made throughout the 20th and 21st centuries, but none have succeeded. Critics continue to argue that its outdated structure hinders efficient governance, while defenders view it as a strong safeguard against government overreach

== See also ==
- Texas Declaration of Independence
- Constitution of the Republic of Texas
- Law of Texas
- The Constitution of India, the world's longest national constitution
- The California Constitution, known for its length and frequent revision due to ballot initiatives
- The Constitution of Alabama, also known for its length and inclusion of unusual provisions
