= Edwin O. LeGrand =

American politician

Edwin Oswald LeGrand (June 28, 1801–1861) was one of the fifty-seven men who signed the Texas Declaration of Independence.

LeGrand was born in North Carolina on June 28, 1801, and married Martha McGehee in the same state in 1825. In 1833 the family, including the couples son and daughter, moved to the Ayish Bayou district of Mexican Texas (what is now San Augustine County in the US state of Texas). He received a land grant from the Mexican government on May 11, 1835.

LeGrand took part in the Texas Revolution of 1835-1836; he was the San Augustine delegate to the Convention of 1836 at Washington-on-the-Brazos. LeGrand fought in the Battle of San Jacinto as a private in the Second Regiment of the Texas Volunteers. After the revolution he served as chief justice of San Augustine County in the Republic of Texas. On November 18, 1839 he was elected as the inspector of the Third Brigade of the Texas militia.

His sister, the wife of William Colson Norwood, and her family also settled in San Augustine, Texas, and from 1846 LeGrand lived with them. LeGrand is buried the Macune Cemetery, a short distance south of San Augustine; a historical marker was placed on his grave in 1936 by the Texas Centennial Commission.
