= Convention of 1836 =

Texas convention declaring their independence from Mexico

The Convention of 1836 was the meeting of elected delegates in Washington-on-the-Brazos, Texas in March 1836. The Texas Revolution had begun five months previously, and the interim government, known as the Consultation, had wavered over whether to declare independence from Mexico or pledge to uphold the repudiated Mexican Constitution of 1824. Unlike those of previous Texas councils, delegates to the Convention of 1836 were younger, more recent arrivals to Texas, and more adamant on the question of independence. As delegates prepared to convene, Mexican President Antonio Lopez de Santa Anna led a large army into Texas to quell the revolt; the vanguard of this army arrived at San Antonio de Bexar on February 23.

The Convention was called to order on March 1, and the following day adopted the Texas Declaration of Independence, written by George Childress. Delegates elected an interim government, led by President David G. Burnet and developed a Texas Constitution, which they based primarily on the Constitution of the United States. On March 6 they received a missive from the Texan soldiers besieged at the Alamo, and delegate and commander-in-chief Sam Houston narrowly persuaded the men to continue their work on the constitution rather than rush to aid the soldiers. After the Alamo fell, Santa Anna's army marched towards Washington-on-the-Brazos, prompting the new government to flee.

== Background ==
The Texas Revolution began October 2, 1835 with the Battle of Gonzales. The following month, previously elected delegates convened in a body known as the Consultation. These delegates served as a temporary governing body for Texas, as they struggled with the question of whether Texans were fighting for independence from Mexico or the reimplementation of the Mexican Constitution of 1824, which offered greater freedoms than the current dictatorship. Many Consultation members wished to defer independence until the United States was persuaded to support their struggle. The Consultation quickly degenerated into near anarchy, with the interim legislature indicting the interim Governor, who promptly disbanded the legislature.

On December 10, the Council passed a resolution calling for a new convention of delegates, to convene on March 1, 1836. There was no consensus among Council members as to what the new convention should accomplish. Some wanted the convention to form a new government for Texas, and others insisted on the preservation of the Mexican Constitution of 1824. One of the Consultation delegates wrote to Sam Houston that "I sincerely hope the Convention will remedy the existing evils and calm the Public since if not Texas must be lost."

Over the next few months, the provisional government of Texas essentially collapsed. By February, most Consultation members had returned home or to the army.

By the end of 1835, no Mexican troops remained in Texas. As early as October, however, Mexican President Antonio Lopez de Santa Anna had been making plans to quell the unrest in Texas. He stepped down from his duties as president to lead what he dubbed the Army of Operations in Texas, which would put an end to the Texas revolt. Personally leading his forces, Santa Anna crossed the Rio Grande on February 12. Santa Anna and his advance force arrived in San Antonio de Bexar on February 23 and immediately initiated a siege of the Texas forces garrisoned at the Alamo.

== Delegates ==
Elections were scheduled for February 1, 1836. There was much disagreement throughout Texas as to whether voting rights should extend to Tejanos or recent arrivals from the United States who had joined the Army of the People. The Consultation had specified that voting rights would be extended to all Tejanos "opposed to a Central Government" and indicated that army volunteers could only vote by proxy in their home districts. This bill was vetoed by provisional governor Smith, who believed that no Tejanos should be allowed to vote. In an editorial, the Telegraph and Texas Register echoed the concerns of many that the newly arrived recruits "cannot be acquainted either with the state of the country or the character and pretensions of the candidates" and advocated a residency requirement. Because the army was concentrated in only two areas, their numbers often overwhelmed those of the local residents.

The Consultation reorganized the voting districts. San Augustine, Harrisburg, and Gonzales each received four fewer delegates than in the past, and Milam received three fewer delegates. With little actual guidance from the Consultation, voting in each municipality was subject to local traditions. In some areas, such as the Jackson district, citizens held a meeting in January to determine if they were for independence or federalism. Once consensus was reached that they wanted independence, only candidates who agreed with that platform were considered. Other areas offered no actual choice; in Mina, the only candidates to run for office were the local empresario, Sterling C. Robertson, and his nephew, George C. Childress. For most of the region, however, candidates engaged in lively debate about either the issues or the personalities of their opponents.

The soldiers who had flocked to the army were determined to vote, regardless of how long they had actually been in Texas or whether they intended to stay. In at least one instance, in Matagorda, soldiers who had been discharged from service voted in the election while they were en route to the United States. There was no consistency in how the votes of active volunteers were handled. In Goliad, soldiers held their own election for two delegates. In nearby San Patricio, locals refused to allow the soldiers to vote; their results were later overturned by the Convention. Soldiers turned away in Refugio simply held their own election.

In the Nacogdoches district, soldiers under Sidney Sherman threatened violence after they were turned away from the polling place. Sherman vowed that he "had come to Texas to fight for it and has as soon commence in the town of Nacogdoches as elsewhere." Anxious to avoid an armed fight, election judges asked the public to vote on whether the troops should be allowed to vote. The soldiers lost by 30 votes, yet refused to back down, insisting that the voting had been rigged. Finally, one of the candidates, Thomas Jefferson Rusk, talked the judges into allowing the soldiers to vote. In the final results in Nacogdoches, Rusk and one other pro-independence candidate, Robert Potter, were named delegates, along with pro-federalist candidates John S. Roberts and Charles S. Taylor.

A similar melee was avoided in Bexar, where army commander James C. Neill worked out a compromise with local civilian authorities. The garrison held their own election to name two delegates, while Bexar citizens - primarily Tejanos - who took an oath of allegiance to the provisional government could elect an additional 4 men. The two men almost unanimously elected by the garrison, Samuel Maverick and Jesse Badgett were staunch supporters of independence. Several soldiers also received votes in the locals' election, although the final delegates were locals. Soldier Amos Pollard threatened that if the locals did not vote for independence, they might want to rethink the idea of coming home.

This convention differed from the previous Texas councils of 1832, 1833, and the Consultation. Many of the delegates to the 1836 convention were young men who had only recently arrived in Texas, although many of them had participated in one of the battles in 1835. Most of the delegates were members of the War Party and were adamant that Texas must declare its independence from Mexico.

A total of 59 delegates were elected to the Convention, 5 more than were supposed to attend. This was largely due to the extra elections soldiers had conducted. Over one-third of the delegates came from extreme east or west Texas, areas not represented at the Consultation. Five delegates attended from the Red River district, an area disputed between Texas and the United States (and now considered part of Arkansas). The delegates were largely new to politics; only 13 of them had taken part in the Consultation, 7 in the Conventions of 1832 or 1833, and only 8 had held local office during Mexican rule. Fewer than 20% of the delegates had participated in the 1835 Committees of Safety. Neither the governor, Smith, or the acting governor, Robinson, were elected as delegates to the Convention. Notably, a few delegates did have extensive public service experience. Lorenzo de Zavala was a former governor of the State of Mexico., and Jose Antonio Navarro had served in the Mexican legislature. Potter, Childress, Richard Ellis and Samuel Price Carson each had significant political experience in the United States.

The average age of the Convention delegates was 37.4, over a year younger than those elected to the Consultation. They had lived in Texas an average of 4 years, a relatively low length of time considering that this included two men - Jose Francisco Ruiz and Navarro - who had been born in Texas. A full quarter of the delegates had lived in Texas less than a year, and 42% for less than two years.

The army's influence was obvious. Forty percent of the delegates (24 men) had served in the army in October–December 1835. Four other delegates were directly related to men serving in the army. These numbers meant the army bloc was just shy of a majority of delegates, ensuring that the army's needs would actually be addressed this time.

== Proceedings ==
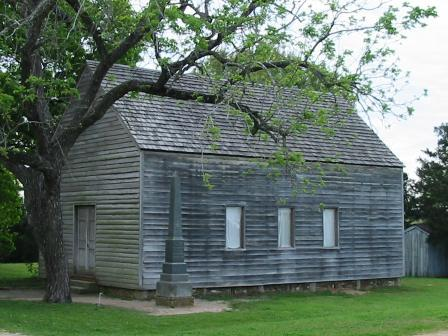
Replica of the building at Washington-on-the-Brazos where the Texas Declaration of Independence was signed. An inscription reads: "Here a Nation was born".

Forty-one delegates arrived in Washington-on-the-Brazos on February 28. By the time the convention concluded, the final number of delegates reached 59 delegates. Notable members of the delegates assembled included future president of the Republic of Texas, Sam Houston, and Mexican politician Lorenzo de Zavala. The convention was convened on March 1 with Richard Ellis as president.

The delegates assigned George Childress to lead a committee of five to draft a Declaration of Independence. Childress, the nephew of empresario Sterling C. Robertson, had been elected to the Convention three weeks after his arrival in Texas. The committee submitted its draft within a mere 24 hours, leading historians to speculate that Childress had written much of it before his arrival at the Convention. The declaration was approved on March 2 with no debate. Based primarily on the writings of John Locke and Thomas Jefferson, the declaration proclaimed that the Mexican government "ceased to protect the lives, liberty, and property of the people, from whom its legitimate powers are derived" and complained about "arbitrary acts of oppression and tyranny". The declaration officially established the Republic of Texas.

Shortly after adopting the declaration of independence, the delegates began to work on a new Constitution. It drew heavily from the United States Constitution and included a declaration of rights (similar to the Bill of Rights) which guaranteed due process, the right of every citizen to bear arms, and freedom of religion, speech, and press. The declaration of rights also outlawed unreasonable search and seizure, debtors' prison, and cruel or unusual punishments. It omitted the Third Amendment to the United States Constitution and instead explicitly authorized the government to quarter troops in private homes and impress property as needed for the war effort.

In a departure from the traditional Texas justice system, the Constitution called for grand jury indictments and speedy public trials with juries. Unlike the United States Constitution, however, the Texas Constitution codified racism. Free blacks were forbidden permanent residence in Texas without consent of Congress, and citizenship could not be granted to Africans, their descendants, or Native Americans. Furthermore, the Constitution forbade the future Texas Congress from emancipating slaves, and instructed slaveholders not to emancipate their own slaves without Congress's consent. Citizenship was granted only to white men. The new Constitution specifically stated that governmental authority derived from the people, who thus had the right to revolt to change their government.

The largest debates centered around land policy, as delegates struggled to balance the competing claims of natives, settlers, army volunteers, and colonizers. Every single proposal for a new land policy was sent back to committee or defeated, until the last day. The new policy benefited settlers and army volunteers, ensuring they would get the land promised when they emigrated. All surveys completed before November 1835 were validated, and any issued since – when the land offices were supposed to be closed – were vacated. All further surveys were banned until the new Congress could establish a land office. Additionally, three controversial land grants were overturned.

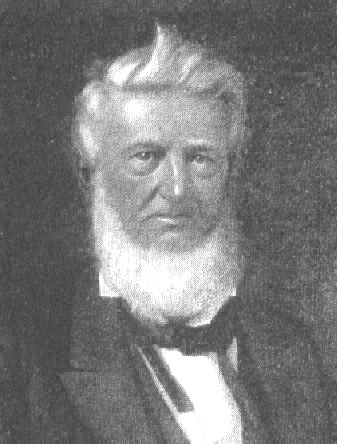
David G. Burnet was elected the interim president of the new Republic of Texas.

On the morning of March 6, the Convention received a letter, dated March 3, from Alamo commander William B. Travis. Travis begged for supplies and reinforcements and described the danger he and his men found themselves in. Unaware that the fort had already fallen, delegate Robert Potter called for the Convention to adjourn and march immediately to relieve the Alamo. Sam Houston persuaded the delegates to remain in Washington-on-the-Brazos to finish working on the constitution. Houston then left to take command of the volunteers that Colonel James C. Neill and Major R.M. "Three-Legged Willie" Williamson had been gathering in Gonzales. Shortly after Houston's arrival in Gonzales, Alamo survivors Susanna Dickinson and Joe, Travis's slave, arrived with news of a Mexican victory. On hearing their news, Houston advised all civilians in the area to evacuate and ordered the army to retreat. This sparked a mass exodus of Texans from the Anglo settlements.

Concerned that the existing army was not large enough, on March 12 the Convention issued a conscription law. All able-bodied white and Tejano men between ages 17 and 50 were subject to military service. Local authorities would assign two-thirds of the men in their district to fight at any one time. Those who refused to serve would lose their citizenship and half of their property. Tejanos would not serve alongside the Anglos, but would instead have a separate corps.

After finishing their constitution, the delegates organized an ad-interim government which would serve until the following October. As president they chose David G. Burnet, who had not been elected to the Convention. Burnet had planned to join the fighting at the Alamo and had stopped at the Convention to recruit others. However, he became so "inspired by their deliberations" that he remained as a visitor. Speaking privately with many of the delegates, Burnet professed that he would be willing to serve as president of a new republic, even if that made him a target of Santa Anna. Among the names most commonly circulated for the presidency were empresario Stephen F. Austin, Sam Houston, and William H. Wharton. All were absent from the convention, however, so the nominees became Burnet and Samuel Price Carson. Burnet won, on a vote of 29–23, in the early hours of March 17. The delegates chose Lorenzo de Zavala as vice-president, Samuel P. Carson as Secretary of State, and Thomas J. Rusk as Secretary of War. Bailey Hardeman became Secretary of the Treasury, and David Thomas was elected Attorney General.

One of Burnet's first acts as president was to transfer the capital of the new state from Washington-on-the-Brazos to Harrisburg, which was located nearer the small Texas Navy at Galveston Island. Harrisburg was also closer to the border with the United States and would allow easier communication with U.S. officials. The move took on a sense of urgency when the convention received word that Santa Anna was within 60 miles (100 km) of Washington-on-the-Brazos. Burnet quickly adjourned the proceedings and the government fled. Burnet personally carried the Texas Declaration of Independence in his saddlebags.

== See also ==
- History of Texas
