= Congress of the Republic of Texas =

National bicameral legislature of the Republic of Texas (1836–1848)

Republic of Texas Congress

Type
- Type: Bicameral
- Houses: Senate; House of Representatives

History
- Founded: March 10, 1836
- Disbanded: February 19, 1846
- Succeeded by: Texas Legislature (1846- Present)

Leadership
- President of the Senate: Lorenzo De Zavala (first); Kenneth Lewis Anderson (last)
- Speaker of the House: Ira Ingram (first); John M. Lewis (last)
- Seats: Variable (9th Congress) - 54 14 Senators 40 Representatives

Meeting place
- Columbia (1836); Houston (1837–1839); Austin (1839–1842); Washington-on-the-Brazos (1842–1845)

Constitution
- Constitution of the Republic of Texas

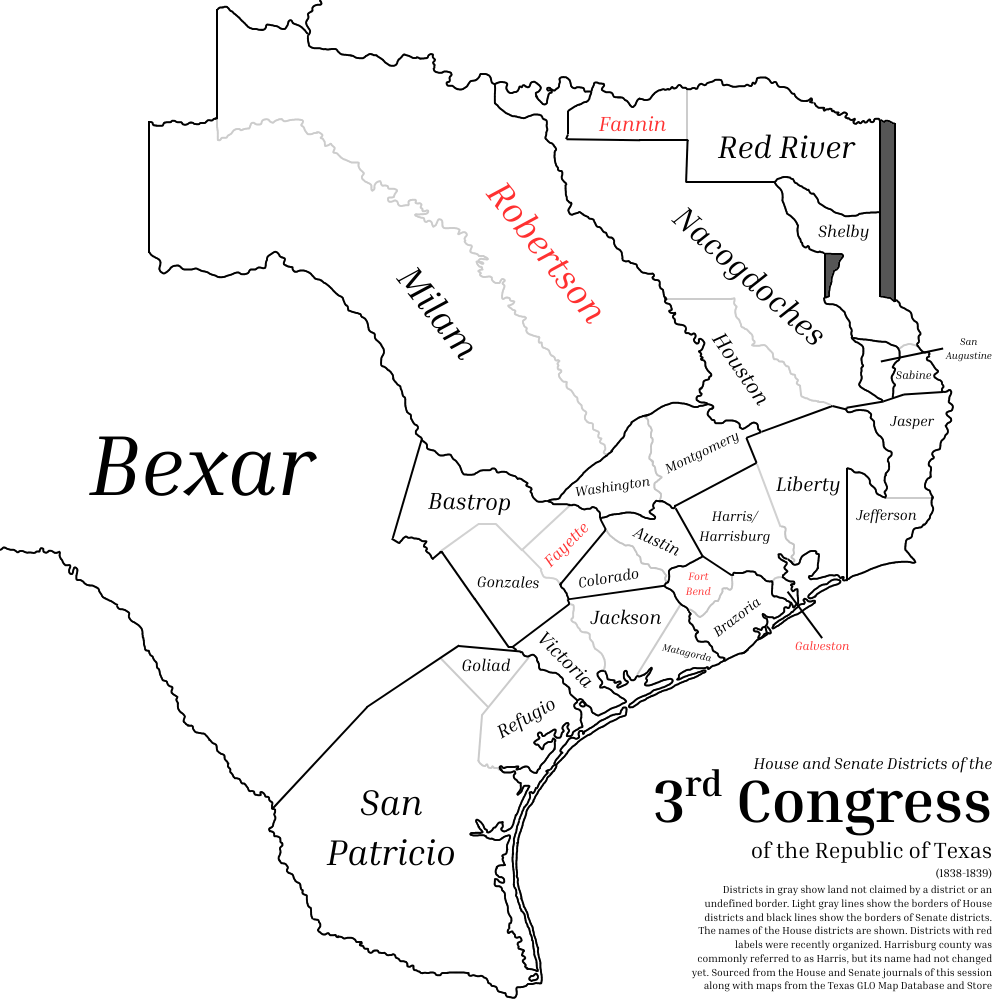
A map of House and Senate Districts of the 3rd Congress

The Congress of the Republic of Texas was the national legislature of the Republic of Texas established by the Constitution of the Republic of Texas in 1836. It was a bicameral legislature based on the model of the United States Congress. It was transformed into the Texas Legislature upon annexation of Texas by the United States in 1846. A vestige of it remains in the name of Austin's main north–south street leading from the State Capitol, Congress Avenue, when it was founded as the intended national capital.

== Membership and organization ==
=== House of Representatives ===
The House of Representatives was to be made up of 24-40 members, until such time as the population of the republic should exceed 100,000. When the population exceeded this number the House was to be made up of "not less than forty nor more than one hundred pieces provided that each county was entitled to at least one representative."

Members of the House were elected on the first Monday in September, each year and were elected to a one-year term. A member had to at least be twenty-five years old, a citizen of the republic, and a resident of his district for six months. The House chose its speaker and had sole power of impeachment.

=== Senate ===
The Senate was chosen by districts that were as nearly equal as possible to the population of free men ("free negroes and Indians excepted"). The Senate was to have a membership numbering "not less than one-third nor more than one-half that of the House."

Senate districts were entitled to be represented by no more than one member. A senator had to be thirty or older, a citizen of the republic, and a resident of his district for one year. Senators were elected to three year terms, with one-third of the members being elected each year. The Vice President presided over the Senate, "but shall not vote on any question, unless the senate be equally divided." Beyond that, the Senate chose its own officers, including the President pro tem, and had sole responsibility to try impeachments.

=== General ===
No person holding an office of profit under the government, or who collected money on behalf of the government was eligible to serve in the Congress. No minister of the gospel or priest of any denomination whatever was eligible to the office of the Executive of the Republic, nor to a seat of either branch of the Congress of the same. Each house was to judge election and qualification of its own members. A quorum in either house was two-thirds of its membership. Members were to receive pay as fixed by law, but no change could be made in salary in the session in which the change was made. Since the terms of House members was one year, each Congress lasted only one year.

== History of the Texas Congress ==
=== 1st Congress ===
On July 23, 1836, interim President David G. Burnet, pursuant to the Constitution of the Republic of Texas, ordered that an election for Congress take place in Columbia on the first Monday in September 1836. As part of the same proclamation, Burnet mandated that the 1st Congress of the Republic of Texas convene on October 3, 1836, also at Columbia. This Congress governed in Columbia until it ordered a recess on December 22.

== Powers of the Congress ==
Article II of the Constitution of the Republic of Texas set forth the following powers:

- to levy and collect taxes and imposts, excise and tonnage duties; to borrow money on the faith, credit, and property of the government, to pay the debts and to provide for the common defence and general welfare of the republic.
- to regulate commerce, to coin money, to regulate the value thereof and of foreign coin, to fix the standard of weights and measures, but nothing but gold and silver shall be made a lawful tender.
- to establish post offices and post roads, to grant charters of incorporation, patents and copy rights, and secure to the authors and inventors the exclusive use thereof for a limited time.
- to declare war, grant letters of marque and reprisal, and to regulate captures.
- to provide and maintain an army and navy, and to make all laws and regulations necessary for their government.
- to call out the militia to execute the law, to suppress insurrections, and repel invasion.
- to make all laws which shall be deemed necessary and proper to carry into effect the foregoing express grants of power, and all other powers vested in the government of the republic, or in any officer or department thereof.

== See also ==
- Bibliography of the Texas Revolution, Republic, and Annexation
- History of Texas
- 1st Congress of the Republic of Texas, 1836–37
- Timeline of the Republic of Texas
- President of the Republic of Texas
- List of speakers of the Texas House of Representatives
- Ashworth Act
- Texas Legislature
