= Constitution of the Republic of Texas =

1836–45 supreme law of independent Texas

Overview
- Jurisdiction: Republic of Texas
- Created: March 16, 1836
- Presented: March 17, 1836
- Ratified: September 5, 1836
- Date effective: September 5, 1836
- System: Presidential republic

Government structure
- Branches: 3
- Chambers: Bicameral
- Executive: President
- Judiciary: Supreme, Districts
- Federalism: No
- Electoral college: No
- Entrenchments: 0

History
- First legislature: October 3, 1836
- First executive: October 22, 1836
- First court: January 13, 1840
- Repealed: December 29, 1845
- Amendments: 0
- Citation: Constitution of Republic of Texas (PDF), Tarlton Law Library
- Location: Unknown (Texas State Library and Archives Commission has drafts)
- Commissioned by: Convention of 1836 in Washington-on-the-Brazos, Texas
- Author: Delegates of the Convention of 1836 (principally George Childress)
- Signatories: 52 of 59 delegates
- Media type: Parchment
- Supersedes: Constitution of Coahuila and Texas
- Superseded by: Constitution of Texas

Full text
- Constitution of the Republic of Texas at Wikisource

The Constitution of the Republic of Texas was the supreme law of Texas from 1836 to 1845.

On March 2, 1836, Texas declared itself an independent republic because of a lack of support in the United States for the Texas Revolution. The declaration of independence was written by George Childress and modeled after the United States Constitution. Lorenzo de Zavala helped in the drafting of the Constitution of the Republic of Texas by personally designing its flag and serving as vice president.

A copy of the Constitution of the Republic of Texas was included with the declaration of independence. The constitution borrowed language from the US Constitution and the constitutions of several southern states. It formed a unitary republic, rather than the federal republic as defined in the US Constitution. The President of the Republic of Texas had a three-year term and could not serve another consecutive term, which was based on provisions in the Mexican Constitution. The Texas Constitution also protected the right to own slaves and prohibited "Indians" and "Africans" from living freely in the country or from becoming Texan citizens.

== History ==
=== Constitutional Convention and ratification ===
A constitutional convention began after the declaration of independence, and an interim government was put into place. The convention adopted a document on March 16, 1836 and adjourned the next day. Because of the defeat of Santa Anna at San Jacinto on April 22, 1836, war with Mexico was over. When June came around, the Republic of Texas had de facto independence as it was unrecognized by Mexico, but Mexico was unable to bring the Republic to an end. Interim President Burnet, on July 23, 1836 called for elections to ratify the constitution and to decide if Texas should pursue annexation into the United States. The elections were to occur on the first Monday of September. After the elections, the constitution was ratified, Sam Houston was elected president, and Mirabeau Buonaparte Lamar became his vice-president, and the seeking annexation was decided.

=== Statehood ===
On March 1, 1845, the United States enacted a congressional joint resolution to propose the annexation of Texas to the United States (Joint Resolution for annexing Texas to the United States, Joint Resolution 8, enacted March 1, 1845, 5 Stat. 797). On June 23, 1845, the Texan Congress accepted the US Congress joint resolution and consented to President Anson Jones's call for a convention to be held on July 4, 1845. A Texas convention debated the annexation offer and almost unanimously passed an ordinance assenting to it on July 4, 1845. The convention debated until August 28 and adopted the Constitution of the State of Texas on August 27. The citizens of Texas approved an annexation ordinance and a new constitution on October 13. On December 29, 1845, the United States admitted the State of Texas to the Union (Joint Resolution for the admission of the state of Texas into the Union, Joint Resolution 1, enacted December 29, 1845, 9 Stat. 108).

== Sections ==
The Constitution of the Republic of Texas contains nine portions, six articles, a schedule, General Provisions, and a Declaration of Rights.

=== Article I ===
Article I established the three branches of government, legislative, executive, and judicial. It contained sections that defined in greater detail the legislative branch, which is defined as a Senate and House of Representatives, which are to be called The Congress of the Republic of Texas. Members of the House are to be chosen on the first Monday of September and to hold their office for one year until other provisions are made. To hold a seat in the House, they need to be at least twenty-five, a citizen of the republic, and residing in the county or district represented for six months prior to the election. The House is not to consist of less than twenty-four or more than forty members until the population reaches one hundred thousand, and then it shall not be less than forty or more than one hundred members. Senators were chosen by their districts equal in free white population. The number of senators is to never be less than one third or more than one half of that of representatives. Each district is to have one member. Senators are chosen for three years on the first Monday of September. They must be citizens of the republic, reside in the district they represent for at least one year before the election, and be at least thirty. The vice President was to be the president of the senate but could not vote unless there was a tie. Each house was the judge of elections, qualifications, and returns of its own members. Two thirds of each House was needed for a quorum, but a smaller number could still adjourn and call those who are not in attendance. Houses were able to determine their own rules for proceedings and punishment. Vacancies that happen in either house were to be filled by the president. The President was required to sign passed bills and can send them back in which case a two-thirds majority of both Houses can enact the law.

=== Article II ===
Article II defined the powers of Congress and gave it the ability to tax and to borrow money, and it required congress to provide for the general welfare of the republic. It was given the power to regulate commerce. Congress could declare war and must provide and maintain a navy.

=== Article III ===
The President was the chief magistrate of the Republic of Texas. The first elected president served two years and could not serve a succeeding term. Other presidents were elected for three years and also could not serve a succeeding term.

=== Article IV ===
Article IV established the judiciary and the Supreme Court and gave Congress the power to establish lower courts. There were to be no fewer than three and no more than eight judicial districts. After defining court structure, the article established counties and allowed new counties to be made.

=== Article V ===
Article V required members of Congress or anyone else who enters office to take an oath. It also forbids ministers of the Gospel from holding office, as it would distract them from their Godly duties.

=== Article VI ===
Article VI built on Article III and defined the role and power of the president, who was required to be at least thirty-five and a citizen and to have lived in the republic for at least three years before election or to have lived there at the time of independence. On the second Monday of December after the election, the president was to enter office and was to be the commander-in-chief of the army and the navy but did not command them personally without the authorization by Congress. It also defined voting qualifications and procedures. Any male citizen who was twenty-one and had been in Texas for six months could vote. Elections were to all be by ballot unless congress determines otherwise.

=== Schedule ===
The schedule deals with the formation of the interim government needed by a rule of the declaration of independence.

=== General Provisions ===
This established the laws, duties, and rights that in the constitution. Convicted criminals could not hold office, vote, or be on juries. Congress was to establish and fund a system of education. Any white person who lives in the republic for at least six months can take an oath to become a citizen.

"All free white persons who shall emigrate to this republic... shall be entitled to all the privileges of citizenship."

Slaves who were brought to Texas are to remain slaves of the one who brought them in. Their owner could not free them without the consent of Congress, which may not pass laws that either affect the slave trade or declare emancipation.

Congress shall pass no laws to prohibit emigrants from bringing their slaves into the republic with them, and holding them by the same tenure by which such slaves were held in the United States; nor shall congress have power to emancipate slaves; nor shall any slaveholder be allowed to emancipate his or her slave or slaves without the consent of congress, unless he or she shall send his or her slave or slaves without the limits of the republic.

"Africans, the descendants of Africans, and Indians" shall not be considered citizens of the republic.

The head of a family, except for "Africans, the descendants of Africans, and Indians", was entitled to one league and labor of land. Every man at least seventeen was entitled to one third of a league of land. Amendments to the constitution, to be ratified, must be passed to by a majority of each house and then be put to a vote by the people.

=== Declaration of Rights ===
The Declaration of Rights establishes how people were to be treated by the government and what freedoms they were allowed. All free, white men were to have equal rights. Political power was established to be held by the people, no preference by law was to be given to any religion; freedom of religion was established. Citizens were allowed full liberty of speech, which could be harmed by no laws.

== See also ==
- Constitution of the State of Texas

== Bibliography ==
- Fehrenbach, T.R. (1968). Lone Star: A History of Texas and Texans. New York: The Macmillan Company.
- Gammel, H.P.N. (1898). The Laws of Texas, 1822-1897. Vol. 2.
- Weeks, Wm. F. (1846). Debates of the Texas Convention. Archived from the original on February 6, 2016.
- Republic of Texas (1836). Constitution of the Republic of Texas: to which is prefixed the Declaration of Independence, made in convention, March 2, 1836. Washington [D.C.]: Sabin Americana. Gale, Cengage Learning. Northern Illinois University Library.
