= Robert M. Coleman (Texan politician) =

American politician (1793–1837)

Commanded a Texas Ranger division
- In office 1836–1837

1st Commanding Officer of Coleman's Fort
- In office namesake and constructor 1836 – 1836/37
- Succeeded by: Maj. William H. Smith

Alcalde (Mayor) of Mina
- In office elected 1834 – term tbd

Personal details
- Born: (possibly) Robert Morris Coleman; 1799 Kentucky, U.S.
- Died: July 1, 1837 (aged 37–38) Brazos River at Velasco, Texas, U.S.

Military service
- Allegiance: United States; Mexico as Landowner; Republic of Texas
- Branch/service: United States Army; Army of the Republic of Texas
- Years of service: U.S. Army; Texian Army: 1835–36
- Rank: U.S. Army: Corporal; Texian Army:Corporal
- Battles/wars: • Texas Revolutionary War • Battle of Concepción • Battle of San Jacinto

Robert M. Coleman (c. 1799 – July 1, 1837) was a Republic of Texas politician, soldier, and an early commander of the Texas Rangers. A signatory of the Texas Declaration of Independence, he served as an aide-de-camp to Sam Houston at the Battle of San Jacinto. His later career was marked by a public feud with Houston, leading to his dismissal from the army and the publication of the critical pamphlet Houston Displayed. He is the namesake of Coleman County, Texas.

Coleman was appointed one of the first Texas Rangers. His outpost, Coleman's Fort, was later named Fort Colorado. Early writers on Coleman include Noah Smithwick, a contemporary frontiersman who was stationed at Coleman's Fort. Coleman is referenced in Smithwick's book Recollections of Old Texas Days.

On February 1, 1858, he became the posthumous namesake of Coleman County, Texas. This led to Coleman City, Coleman Lake, and many other features, places, businesses, and identifiers in Coleman County also bearing his name.

== Suspicious drowning ==
Coleman died in 1837 at Brazos River. He supposedly drowned, though there are suspicions of foul play.

== See also ==
- Coleman County, Texas
- Battle of Concepción
- Texas Declaration of Independence
- Constitution of the Republic of Texas
- Texas Revolution
- Texas Republic
- Timeline of the Republic of Texas
- Old Three Hundred land transfers
- Spain land grants and caretakers
