= John W. Bower =

John White Bower

Chief justice of Refugio County, Texas

Member of the House of Representatives Congress of the Republic of Texas for Refugio County, Texas
- In office 1841–1843

Representative from San Patricio at the Convention of 1836
- In office 1836–1836

Personal details
- Born: December 7, 1808 Talbotton, Georgia
- Died: January 13, 1850 (aged 41)
- Spouse: Bridget O'Brien

John White Bower (December 7, 1808 – January 13, 1850) was a Texas settler, signatory to the Texas Declaration of Independence, member of the House of Representatives for the Republic of Texas, and Judge.
