= David Thomas (Texas politician) =

American politician

David Thomas (10 December 1795 – 1836) was a signatory of the Texas Declaration of Independence and the first Attorney General (ad interim) and acting Secretary of War of the Republic of Texas.

== Early life and family ==
David Thomas was the third of six children of William and Elizabeth (Purviance) Thomas of Wilson County, Tennessee. He was born on 10 December 1795 (State of Texas records say 1801), presumably in Wilson County, Tennessee. His parents removed from Middle Tennessee to Dyer County in the newly opened Western District of Tennessee.

David Thomas's father, William Thomas, was from the area of Statesville, North Carolina, then Tennessee. His three brothers, Henry, James, and John, were also soldiers in the Revolutionary War. William's father was Jacob Thomas of Rowan County, North Carolina, also a Revolutionary War soldier, who married Margaret Brevard.

David Thomas's mother Elizabeth was the daughter of American Revolutionary War soldier John Purviance of Rowan County, who married Mary Jane Wasson. One of Elizabeth's brothers was David Purviance, who is listed as a co-founder with Barton Stone of the Christian Church-Church of Christ which originated at the Cane Ridge Meeting House in Bourbon County, Kentucky, outside Paris, Kentucky, circa 1804. David Purviance served in the Kentucky and Ohio legislatures, where he continually advocated abolitionism, and was an early trustee of Miami University, serving often as the board's president pro tempore. Levi Purviance wrote a biography of the father David Purviance. A birth quilt made by his family is crafted "D.O. Thomas", but his middle name is unknown and it is possible that the intent was "DP" for "David Purviance Thomas", reflecting his mother's maiden name.

David Thomas later became a lawyer. It is known that Sam Houston read law at Maryville College in eastern Tennessee, but is not yet known where his friend and colleague David Thomas read law, whether with a preceptor or at college. Also, it is known that David Thomas's first cousin-once removed, James Houston Thomas was the Attorney General of Tennessee 1836–1842, at roughly the same time David Thomas was attorney general ad interim of the Republic of Texas.

== The independence of Texas ==
David Thomas affixed his signature to the Texas Declaration of Independence alongside that of Sam Houston, each from Refugio on March 2, 1836. His writings in the Texas State Archives as Secretary of War reveal, by the degree of shakiness of handwriting, the relative proximity to the Texans of Santa Anna's troops heading toward San Jacinto.

On 3 March 1836, David Thomas was amongst those appointed to the Constitutional Committee for the nascent Republic of Texas and is thought to have been a principal drafter of the Constitution of the Republic of Texas: on the committee were, inter alia, David Thomas and Sam Houston of Refugio, Texas, and Robert Hamilton of Red River and James Collinsworth of Brazoria.

== Death and legacy ==
Thomas died 1836 after suffering a mortal wound from a musket ball in the leg on the steamship Cayuga when fleeing troops of Santa Anna (Antonio Lopez de Santa Anna) with the new government of the Republic of Texas as part of the Runaway Scrape. David Thomas is buried in a hero's grave in the de Zavala Cemetery in the San Jacinto battlefield state shrine near Houston.

David Thomas's land grant from the State of Texas was posthumously claimed by his nephew in West Tennessee John Edwin McCorkle (1839–1924), Tennessee state legislator and son of Jane Maxwell Thomas (Mrs. Edwin Alexander McCorkle), on behalf of all the nieces and nephews of David Thomas. One of them was David E. Thomas, by then an attorney in Austin, Texas, who responded to an inquiry from McCorkle that the land grant was not worth claiming, for it was subject to Indian depredations and back taxes amounting to more than its fair market value. Nevertheless, McCorkle claimed the land for the heirs of the decedent David Thomas.
