= George Childress =

American revolutionary (1804–1841)

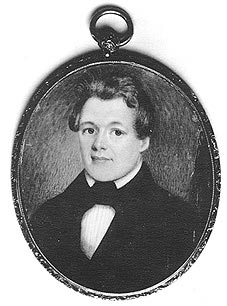
George C. Childress the 3rd is credited as being the author of the Texas Declaration of Independence.

George Campbell Childress (January 8, 1804 – October 6, 1841) was a lawyer, politician, and a principal author of the Texas Declaration of Independence.

== Early life ==
Childress was born on January 8, 1804, in Nashville, Tennessee, to John Campbell Childress and Elizabeth Robertson Childress. His sister Matilda married U.S. Supreme Court associate justice John Catron.

In 1826, Childress attended and graduated from Davidson Academy. Two years later, he was admitted to the Tennessee Bar. George C. Childress studied law for two years later he became chief editor for the Nashville Banner which he remained for 10 years.

== Texas ==
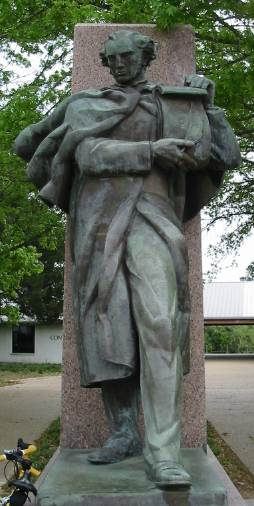
Statue of Childress at Washington-on-the-Brazos State Historical Park in the Washington-on-the-Brazos

After spending some time raising money and volunteers in Tennessee for the Texas army, Childress left permanently for Texas. He crossed the Red River on December 13, 1835. He reached Robertson's Colony on January 9, 1836. The following February he and his uncle, Sterling C. Robertson, were elected to represent Milam Municipality (formerly known as Viesca) at the Convention of 1836. Childress called the convention to order and subsequently introduced a resolution authorizing a committee of five members to draft a Declaration of Independence. Upon adoption of the resolution, he was named chairman of the committee by Richard Ellis (the other members of the committee were Edward Conrad, James Gaines, Bailey Hardeman, and Collin McKinney). The committee finished the drafting in only one day, leading many to believe that Childress had gone to the convention with a draft already prepared (as such, Childress is almost universally acknowledged as the primary author of the document and a newspaper article for his brother Wyatt's memorial states George wrote it in his brother's blacksmith shop).

The convention approved the document on March 2, 1836. The document is modeled closely on the Declaration of Independence of the United States, where most of the signatories had moved from, often illegally. Although the document is dated March 2, the actual signing took place on March 3, after errors were discovered when it was read. On March 19, 1836, Childress and Robert Hamilton were sent to the United States to gain recognition of the new Republic of Texas. They were later replaced by James Collinsworth and Peter W. Grayson.

== Death and legacy ==
In despair following several unsuccessful attempts at establishing a law practice that would support his family, on October 6, 1841, while living in Galveston, Childress took a Bowie knife and committed suicide by cutting open his abdomen.

Childress County, Texas and the city of Childress, Texas, are named in his honor. In 1936, the year of the Texas Centennial, the state erected a statue of Childress in Washington-on-the-Brazos, Texas.
