= Hans Peter Mareus Neilsen Gammel =

Hans Peter Mareus Neilsen Gammel (September 24, 1854 – February 11, 1931) was an author and bookseller. He served as editor and publisher of a series of books reporting Texas legislation enacted by each congressional and legislative session. His first publication consisted of 10 volumes and covered 75 years of Texas legal history. The Laws of Texas 1822-1897 has long been a primary resource for the study of Texas legal history during the Nineteenth Century.

== Background ==
Hans Peter Mareus Neilsen Gammel was born in Grenaa(Grenå), in Region Midtjylland, Aarhus County, Denmark. He was the son of Niels Hansen Gammel and Mittie Marie Brugger. Looking for a better life, he followed his sister to the United States. Gammel and his brother Niels traveled through the western U.S. peddling jewelry and trinkets, looking for a stake in a gold mine. Gammel sent for the family, who eventually caught up with him in Austin, Texas.

== Career ==
Gammel rented a little place in Austin and he set up a stand. He sold writing paper, bits of jewelry, lemonade, and books. In 1881, the old Texas State Capitol burned to the ground. In order to earn a little extra money to help support his growing family, Gammel took the contract to haul away the debris.

Gammel sorted and edited the crinkled papers, then published them beginning in 1898 as the first ten volumes of Gammel’s Laws of Texas, 1822-1897. Additional volumes were published with each legislature until 1937.

== Personal life ==
Gammel married Anna Marie Andersen in Denmark when he was 16. After Anna's death from typhoid in late 1888, Hans married Swedish-born Josephine Matilda Ledel, who bore him eight children.

== Selected works ==
- The Laws of Texas, 1897-1902 Vol 11 - (1902)
- The Laws of Texas, 1903-1905 Vol 12 - (1906)
- The Laws of Texas, 1907 Volume 13 - (1907)
- The Laws of Texas, 1909-1910 Vol 14 - (1910)
- The Laws of Texas, 1911 Volume 15 - (1911)
- The Laws of Texas, 1913-1914 Vol 16 - (1914)
- The Laws of Texas, 1917-1918 Vol 18 - (1918)
- The Laws of Texas, 1919 Volume 19 - (1919)
- The Laws of Texas, 1920-1921 Vol 20 - (1921)
- The Laws of Texas, 1923-1925 Vol 22 - (1925)
- The Laws of Texas, 1925 Volume 23 - (1925)
- The Laws of Texas, 1929-1931 Vol 27 - (1931)

== Primary Source ==
- Bohlender, Dorothy G. and Frances T. McCallum H. P. N. Gammel, Texas Bookman (Waco, Texas: Texian Press. 1985)
- Davis, John L. The Danish Texans (San Antonio: University of Texas. 1979)
