= Collin McKinney =

Texan historical figure

Collin McKinney (April 17, 1766 – September 9, 1861) was an American surveyor, merchant, politician, and lay preacher. He is best known as a figure in the Texas Revolution, as one of the five individuals who drafted the Texas Declaration of Independence and the oldest person to sign it.

== Biography ==
McKinney was born in Hunterdon County, New Jersey, the second of 10 children born to Daniel and Mercy (Blatchley) McKinney. The family moved to Virginia in the 1770s, and while Daniel fought in the American Revolutionary War, Collin McKinney supported the family; thus, he had no formal schooling. After the war, the family moved to an outpost in Lincoln County, Kentucky.

McKinney married twice in his lifetime, first to Annie (Amy) Moore on February 10, 1794, with whom he had four children (James, Ashley, Polly, and Emeline) before she died in 1804, and then again in 1805 to Elizabeth Leek, with whom he had seven more children (William C, twins Amy and Margaret, Anna C, Samuel L, Eliza S, and Younger S).

From 1818 to 1821, McKinney managed the Tennessee estates of Senator George W. Campbell, who was serving as minister to Russia at the time. He also opened a trading post before giving it up and returning to Kentucky. Later, McKinney and many of his relatives moved to Hempstead County, Arkansas, where he was elected as a justice of the peace.

In 1826, McKinney became a friend of Benjamin Milam, who was recruiting settlers for the Red River Colony in Northeast Texas of Empressario and British General Arthur G. Wavell. The land grant was an area claimed by both the United States settlers as part of Miller County, Arkansas Territory, as well as by Mexico.

In 1836, McKinney was one of five delegates from the Red River Colony to the Convention of 1836, which called for Texas to declare its independence from Mexico. He was one of five appointed to draft the Texas Declaration of Independence, and at age 69, he was the oldest to sign it. He later became a member of the committee that drafted the Constitution of the Republic of Texas and also served as a delegate from Red River District and County, Texas, to the First, Second, and Fourth Congresses of the Republic of Texas.

In 1846, at age 80, he moved one last time, due to one of the worst known floods on the Red River, to the northern portion of the rich blackland prairie of Collin County, Texas, to be near several of his children. However, the exact boundary line between Collin and Grayson Counties would not be surveyed and identified for several years. He lived just a few miles southeast of Liberty, Texas, which was soon renamed Mantua by Younger Scott McKinney, the founder.

Collin McKinney died at his home in Collin County on September 9, 1861, and was buried in the nearby Van Alstyne Cemetery in the McKinney family plot. A historical marker erected by the Texas Historical Commission honors this Texan who lived over 95 years under the flags of five nations (Great Britain, United States, Mexico, Texas, and Confederacy).

Around 1873, 12 years after Collin McKinney's death, the few inhabitants of Mantua moved several miles northeast to Van Alstyne, Texas, on the new Houston and Texas Central Railway from Sherman to McKinney and on to Galveston.

Both Collin County and McKinney, Texas, its county seat, were named in his honor by the Texas Legislature.

McKinney is credited with suggesting to the Texas Legislature that, as new counties were later created in North and West Texas, the boundaries should be about 30 miles square. This would allow a rider to travel to the county seat, conduct necessary business, and return home, all in one day.
