= William Clark Jr. (1798–1871) =

American politician

William Clark Jr. (April 14, 1798 – January 3, 1871) was a merchant, a signer of the Texas Declaration of Independence, and a legislator in the Republic of Texas. He is sometimes confused with his son, another Texas state legislator who was also known as William Clark Jr. (1828–1884).

== Biography ==
Clark was born in North Carolina on April 14, 1798. He married Martha B. Wall in the 1820s. They had a son named William Clark Junior in 1828. They lived in Georgia before moving to Sabine County, Texas in 1835, where he operated a successful store. William S Clark Junior and James Gaines both traveled to the Convention of 1836. This convention was brought together to discuss a possible secession and war with Mexico. This created the Texas Declaration of Independence, which both Clark and Gaines signed. Following the convention, interim President David G Burnet of the Republic of Texas, was assisted by Clark by creating a system to collect supplies and other goods for the army to fight against the invading Mexican army.

Clark briefly served as a representative of Sabine County in the House of the Second Congress in 1837 and left in 1838 due to illness. Following the war, and after recovering from his illness, he stayed in Sabine County until he purchased the Planter Hotel in Nacogdoches in 1859, located in East Texas. He managed the property until he died on January 3, 1871. In 1936, the Texas Centennial Commission built a marker on the last Clarks’ home as well as on the graves of Clark and his wife Martha.

William S Clark Junior had a son named William Clark Junior. William Clark Junior followed in his father's footsteps, as he was elected to the state legislature in 1859, and helped Texas in the Secession Convention of 1861, leading Texas into the American Civil War.
