= John Wheeler Bunton =

- Born: 22 February 1807; Sumner County, Tennessee
- Died: 24 August 1879 (aged 72); Mountain City, Texas
- Citizenship: American
- Occupations: Cattleman, statesman
- Known for: signer of Texas Declaration of Independence
- Spouse: Mary Howell

John Wheeler Bunton (22 February 1807 – 24 August 1879) was a Texas settler and signer of the Texas Declaration of Independence (1836), which declared independence from Mexico. He is also known as the great-great-uncle of Lyndon Johnson.
