= Texas Declaration of Independence =

1836 proclamation of Texan independence from Mexico

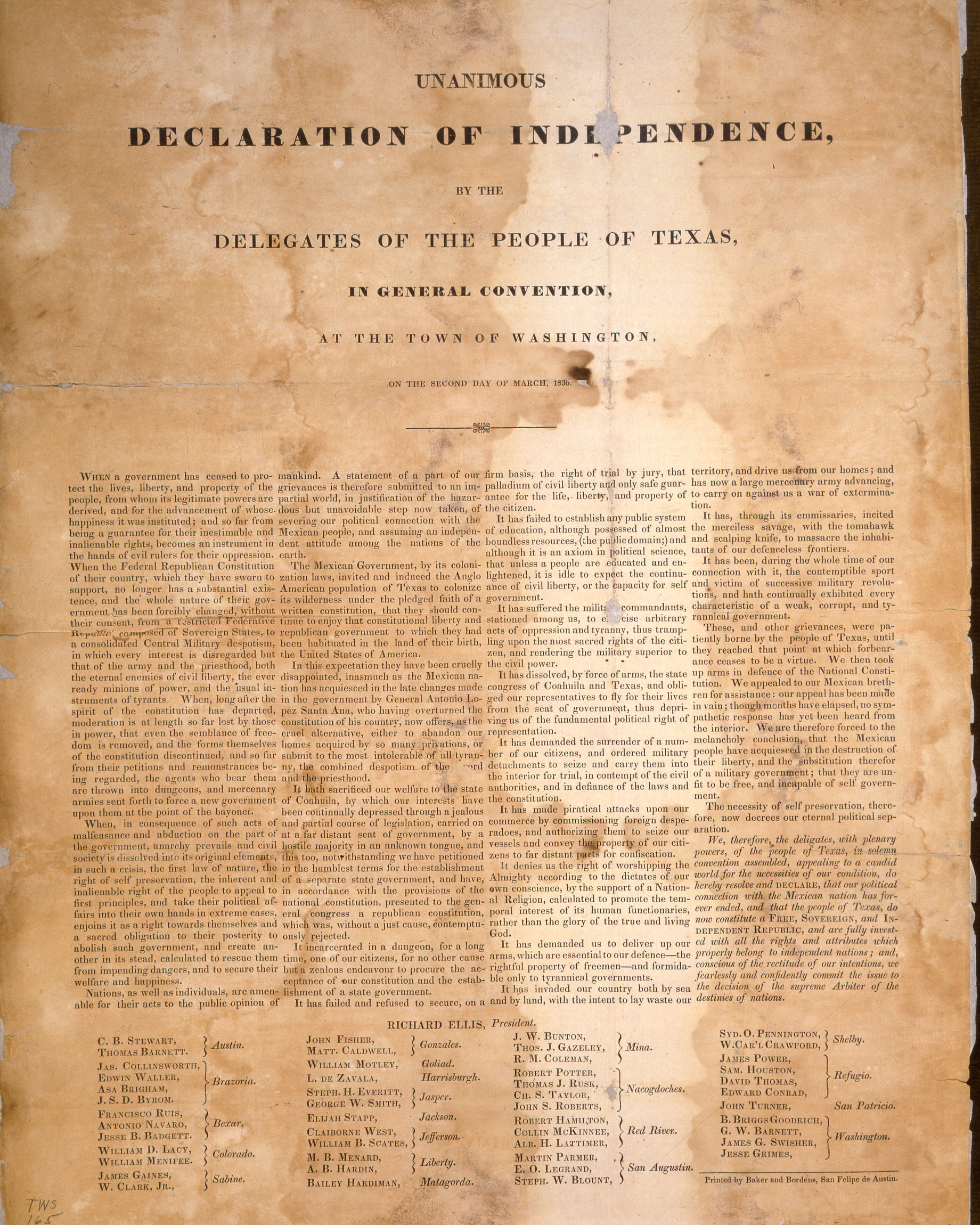
- 1836 facsimile of the Texas Declaration of Independence
- Created: March 2, 1836
- Location: Engrossed copy: Texas State Library and Archives Commission
- Author: George Childress
- Signatories: 59 delegates to the Consultation, 1 Secretary
- Purpose: To announce and explain separation from Mexico

Full text
- Texas Declaration of Independence at Wikisource

The Texas Declaration of Independence, adopted on March 2, 1836, at the Convention of 1836 in Washington-on-the-Brazos, formally declared Texas's independence from Mexico during the Texas Revolution. At the convention George Childress, James Gaines, Edward Conrad, Collin McKinney, and Bailey Hardeman were appointed to committee and tasked with drawing up a declaration of independence. Childress likely wrote the document, or most of it, by himself. It was signed by delegates the following day after corrections were made to the text.

== Background ==
In October 1835, Tejano and Texian settlers in Mexican Texas launched the Texas Revolution. The revolution was driven by a convergence of multiple deep-seated issues including widespread armed Mexican resistance to dictatorial President Antonio Lopez de Santa Anna's abolition of the 1824 Constitution with his Siete Leyes (Seven laws), which relegated Texas as a vassal territory of the Mexican unitary state. Tensions were exacerbated by Mexico's attempts to enforce immigration restrictions and customs tariffs under the Law of April 6th, 1830. Legal, religious, and cultural friction, and frustration with poor civil governance and administrative failures were listed among the grievances of the Texan settlers.

Amongst the people of Texas some believed that the main goal should be complete independence from Mexico, while others sought the reimplementation of the Mexican Constitution of 1824, which established a federal republic with significant state autonomy. A convention was called for on March 1st, 1836 to discuss a solution.

While conservative politicians in Mexico City framed the Seven Laws as a legitimate constitutional restructuring, the abolition of the 1824 Constitution was widely viewed by federalists as an illegal or extra-constitutional centralization of power. This led to a period of armed federalist rebellions in several Mexican states throughout the decade starting with Zacatecas in 1835 and Texas in 1836 but grew to include federalist rebellions in California, Yucatan, New Mexico, Tabasco, Sonora and Sinaloa.

This convention differed from the previous Texas councils of 1832, 1833, and the 1835 Consultation. At the 1835 Consultation, the Peace Party, which consisted primarily of original settlers under the empresario system, won out over the War Party and in the Declaration of November 7th,1835 reaffirmed their desire to remain part of Mexico under the federalist terms of the Constitution of 1824. Many delegates were recent arrivals from the United States who had arrived in Texas after the passage of Mexico's Law of April 6th, 1830 which had suspended most outstanding empresario contracts and restricted further immigration. Moreover, many of them had fought in battles against centralist forces during the Texas Revolution against Mexico in 1835. Of the 60 signers, three were Tejanos: Lorenzo de Zavala, Jose Francisco Ruiz and Jose Antonio Navarro. Most of the delegates were members of the War Party and were adamant that Texas must declare its independence from Mexico. Forty-one of these delegates arrived in Washington-on-the-Brazos on February 28.

== Development ==
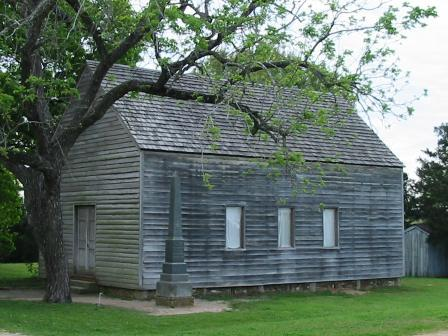
Replica of the building at Washington-on-the-Brazos where the Texas Declaration was signed. An inscription reads: "Here a Nation was born."

The convention was convened on March 1, 1836 with Richard Ellis as president. The delegates selected a committee of five to draft a declaration of independence; this committee was led by George Childress along with Edward Conrad, James Gaines, Bailey Hardeman, and Collin McKinney. The committee submitted its draft within a mere 24 hours, and this led historians to speculate that Childress had written much of it before he arrived at the Convention. The document closely mirrors the United States Declaration of Independence in both structure and tone.

The declaration was approved on March 2nd with no debate. Based primarily on the writings of John Locke and Thomas Jefferson, the declaration proclaimed that the Mexican government "ceased to protect the lives, liberty, and property of the people, from whom its legitimate powers are derived" and stated that it committed "arbitrary acts of oppression and tyranny." The declaration formally states that Texas "is, and of right ought to be, a free sovereign and independent republic," mirroring phrasing used in the Goliad Declaration of Independence drafted by Ira Ingram 4 months prior in December of 1835. The delegates expressed frustration that the 1824 Constitution of Mexico had been altered ("overturned", in their words) by Antonio Lopez de Santa Anna to centralize power and remove state autonomy. They expressed frustration that the "Federal Republican Constitution" had been replaced by "central military despotism" and that petitions to establish a state government separate from that of Coahuila within Mexico had been rejected.

The declaration states that the Mexican Government had invited settlers to Texas under the system of empresario land grants. Beginning with the Colonization Laws of 1823 and 1824, Mexico actively incentivized immigration from the United States to develop the region economically and to serve as a populated frontier buffer against raids by hostile indigenous tribes such as the Comanche.

The declaration officially established the Republic of Texas. While the Mexican Government led by Antonio Lopez de Santa Anna refused to recognize the declaration and viewed the delegates as rebels, filibusteros, or invasores, the document formalized the revolutions political goals. United States didn't recognize the declaration until 1837 because to do so would be tantamount to an act of war against Mexico. The declaration's adoption was followed by the Battle of the Alamo and ultimately the decisive Texian victory at the Battle of San Jacinto in April 1836. This initiated a diplomatic campaign that ultimately secured formal recognition from the United States in 1837, France in 1839, Great Britain in 1840, the Netherlands in 1840, and informal trade ties with Belgium.

The declaration states the following fifteen reasons for rebelling:

1. "The Mexican government, by its colonization laws, invited and induced the Anglo-American population of Texas to colonize its wilderness under the pledged faith of a written constitution, that they should continue to enjoy that constitutional liberty and republican government to which they had been habituated in the land of their birth, the United States of America."
2. "-the Mexican nation has acquiesced in the late changes made in the government by General Antonio Lopez de Santa Anna, who having overturned the constitution of his country, now offers us the cruel alternative, either to abandon our homes, acquired by so many privations, or submit to the most intolerable of all tyranny, the combined despotism of the sword and the priesthood."
3. "It (The Mexican Government of Santa Anna) has sacrificed our welfare to the state of Coahuila, by which our interests have been continually depressed through a jealous and partial course of legislation, carried on at a far distant seat of government, by a hostile majority, in an unknown tongue, and this too, notwithstanding we have petitioned in the humblest terms for the establishment of a separate state government, and have, in accordance with the provisions of the national constitution, presented to the general Congress a republican constitution, which was, without just cause, contemptuously rejected."
4. "It incarcerated in a dungeon, for a long time, one of our citizens, for no other cause but a zealous endeavor to procure the acceptance of our constitution, and the establishment of a state government."
5. "It has failed and refused to secure, on a firm basis, the right of trial by jury, that palladium of civil liberty, and only safe guarantee for the life, liberty, and property of the citizen."
6. "It has failed to establish any public system of education, although possessed of almost boundless resources, (the public domain,) and although it is an axiom in political science, that unless a people are educated and enlightened, it is idle to expect the continuance of civil liberty, or the capacity for self government."
7. "It has suffered the military commandants, stationed among us, to exercise arbitrary acts of oppression and tyrrany, thus trampling upon the most sacred rights of the citizens, and rendering the military superior to the civil power."
8. "It has dissolved, by force of arms, the state Congress of Coahuila and Texas, and obliged our representatives to fly for their lives from the seat of government, thus depriving us of the fundamental political right of representation."
9. "It has demanded the surrender of a number of our citizens, and ordered military detachments to seize and carry them into the Interior for trial, in contempt of the civil authorities, and in defiance of the laws and the constitution."
10. "It has made piratical attacks upon our commerce, by commissioning foreign desperadoes, and authorizing them to seize our vessels, and convey the property of our citizens to far distant ports for confiscation."
11. "It denies us the right of worshipping the Almighty according to the dictates of our own conscience, by the support of a national religion, calculated to promote the temporal interest of its human functionaries, rather than the glory of the true and living God."
12. "It has demanded us to deliver up our arms, which are essential to our defence, the rightful property of freemen, and formidable only to tyrannical governments."
13. "It has invaded our country both by sea and by land, with intent to lay waste our territory, and drive us from our homes; and has now a large mercenary army advancing, to carry on against us a war of extermination."
14. "It has, through its emissaries, incited the merciless savage, with the tomahawk and scalping knife, to massacre the inhabitants of our defenseless frontiers."
15. "It hath been, during the whole time of our connection with it, the contemptible sport and victim of successive military revolutions, and hath continually exhibited every characteristic of a weak, corrupt, and tyrranical government."

Modeled after the United States Declaration of Independence, the Texas Declaration also contains many memorable expressions of American political principles:

- "the right of trial by jury, that palladium of civil liberty, and only safe guarantee for the life, liberty, and property of the citizen.
- "our arms ... are essential to our defense, the rightful property of freemen, and formidable only to tyrannical governments."

== Signatories ==
The New Republic, with the area in yellow under formal control and the green area as claimed territory, over modern borders

Sixty men signed the Texas Declaration of Independence. Three of them were born in Mexico, those being José Antonio Navarro, José Francisco Ruiz, and Lorenzo de Zavala. Fifty-seven moved to Texas from the United States, and ten of them had lived in Texas for more than six years, while one-quarter of them had been in the province for less than a year. A sixtieth name, the Convention Secretary, Herbert S. Kimble, was not a delegate but is signed at the bottom of the document.

- Jesse B. Badgett
- George Washington Barnett
- Thomas Barnett
- Stephen W. Blount
- John W. Bower
- Asa Brigham
- Andrew Briscoe
- John Wheeler Bunton
- John S. D. Byrom
- Mathew Caldwell
- Samuel Price Carson
- George C. Childress
- William Clark, Jr.
- Robert M. Coleman
- James Collinsworth
- Edward Conrad
- William Carroll Crawford
- Lorenzo de Zavala
- Richard Ellis, President of the Convention
- Stephen H. Everett
- John Fisher
- Samuel Rhoads Fisher
- James Gaines
- Thomas J. Gazley
- Benjamin Briggs Goodrich
- Jesse Grimes
- Robert Hamilton
- Bailey Hardeman
- Augustine B. Hardin
- Sam Houston
- Herbert Simms Kimble, Secretary of the Convention
- William D. Lacy
- Albert H. Latimer
- Edwin O. Legrand
- Collin McKinney
- Samuel A. Maverick
- Michel B. Menard
- William Menefee
- John W. Moore
- William Mottley
- José Antonio Navarro
- Martin Parmer
- Sydney O. Pennington
- Robert Potter
- James Power
- John S. Roberts
- Sterling C. Robertson
- José Francisco Ruiz
- Thomas Jefferson Rusk
- William. B. Scates
- George W. Smyth
- Elijah Stapp
- Charles B. Stewart
- James G. Swisher
- Charles S. Taylor
- David Thomas
- John Turner
- Edwin Waller
- Claiborne West
- James B. Woods

== See also ==
- Texas Independence Day
- Timeline of the Republic of Texas
- Bibliography of the Texas Revolution, Republic, and Annexation
