= Ira Ingram =

American politician (1788–1837)

Ira Ingram (August 19, 1788 – September 22, 1837) was a soldier, legislator, and a land owner. He was a member of Stephen F. Austin's Old Three Hundred. Ingram is also noted for being the Republic of Texas's first Speaker of the House.

== Early life ==
Ira Ingram was born in Brookfield, Vermont, the son of Philip and Rachael (Burton) Ingram. Ingram then lived in Tennessee, where he stayed until he moved to New Orleans, Louisiana. In New Orleans, he married Emily B. Holt of Tennessee on March 13, 1823. They had one daughter. Emily Ingram died in October 1824.

== Texas ==
In January 1826, Ingram and his brother Seth moved to the Austin's Colony at his brother's recommendation. In 1828, they were partners in a merchandising establishment in San Felipe de Austin (presently known as San Felipe, Texas). Ira ran for mayor (alcalde) of San Felipe de Austin but lost to Thomas M. Duke. However, that year he represented the Mina District at the Convention of 1832 and San Felipe in the Convention of 1833. The next year, he was elected the first alcalde of Matagorda.

The Texas Revolution broke out on October 2, 1835. On December 22, 1835, Ingram wrote the Goliad Declaration of Independence. Ingram also played a key role in the Texas Revolution. After the war, he was the first Speaker of the House for the Republic of Texas. He served during the First Congress of the Republic of Texas (1836–37).

== See also ==
- List of Convention of 1832 delegates
