= Washington-on-the-Brazos, Texas =

Washington-on-the-Brazos Washington
- Unincorporated community
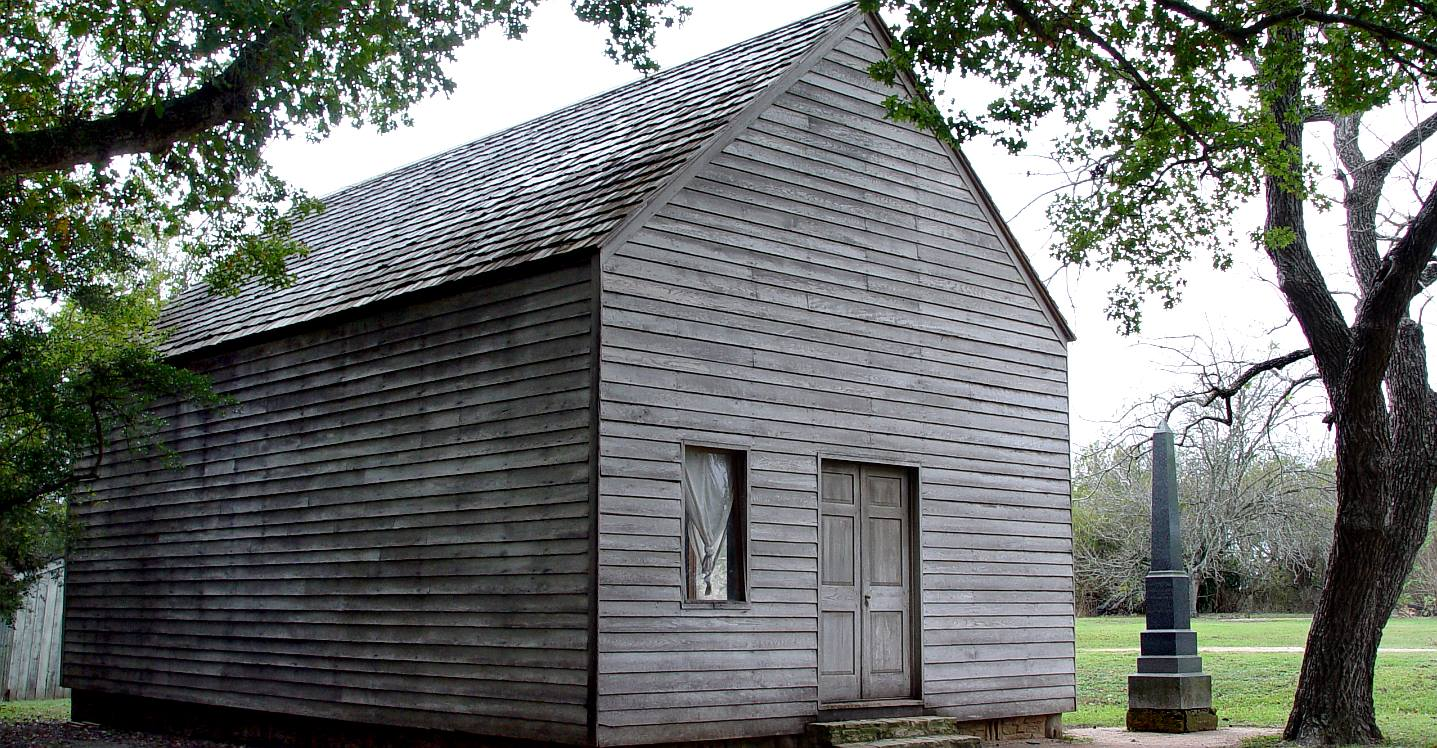
- Replica of Independence Hall, where the Texas Declaration of Independence was signed. The inscription reads: "Here a Nation was born."

- Location of Washington-on-the-Brazos in the state of Texas Location of Washington-on-the-Brazos in the United States
- Coordinates: 30°19′31″N 96°09′24″W
- Country: United States
- State: Texas
- County: Washington
- Elevation: 226 ft (69 m)
- Time zone: UTC-6 (Central (CST))
  - Summer (DST): UTC-5 (CDT)
- ZIP code: 77880
- Area code: 979
- GNIS feature ID: 1349512

Washington-on-the-Brazos, also known simply as Washington, is an unincorporated community along the Brazos River in Washington County, Texas, United States. The town is best known for being the site of the Convention of 1836 and the signing of the Texas Declaration of Independence.

The town is named for Washington, Georgia, itself named for George Washington. It is officially known as just "Washington", but after the Civil War came to be known as "Washington-on-the-Brazos" to distinguish the settlement from "Washington-on-the-Potomac", Washington, D.C.

== History ==
Washington was founded in 1833 by John W. Hall, one of the Old Three Hundred settlers, on land he had been given two years before by his father-in-law Andrew Robinson. It was located at a ferry crossing over the Brazos River on La Bahia Road that dated from 1821.

As the town grew, most settlers were immigrants from the Southern United States, in what was then Mexican Texas. Because of its location on the Brazos River and near major roads, Washington became a commercial center, drawing in new inhabitants from nearby areas. After the outbreak of the Texas Revolution, General Sam Houston made his headquarters at Washington in December 1835.

Washington-on-the-Brazos is known as "the birthplace of Texas" because, on March 1, 1836, Texas delegates met in the town to formally announce Texas' intention to separate from Mexico and to draft a constitution for the new Republic of Texas. They organized an interim government to serve until a permanent one could be formed.

The delegates adopted the Texas Declaration of Independence on March 2, 1836, signing it on the following day. They adopted their constitution on March 16. The delegates worked until March 17, when they had to flee with the residents of Washington, to escape the advancing Mexican Army. The townspeople returned after the Mexican Army was defeated at San Jacinto on April 21. Town leaders lobbied for Washington's designation as the permanent capital of the Republic of Texas, but leaders of the Republic favored Waterloo, later renamed Austin.

Washington County was established by the legislature of the Republic of Texas in 1836 and organized in 1837, when Washington-on-the-Brazos was designated as the county seat. Although the county seat moved to Brenham in 1844, the town continued to thrive as a center for the cotton trade until the mid-1850s, as it was located on the Brazos River to use for shipping out the crop. The construction of railroads bypassed the town and pulled off its businesses. The strife of the Civil War took another toll on the town, and by the turn of the 20th century, it was virtually abandoned.

The Washington American, an organ of the American (Know Nothing) party, was published there in 1855 and 1856.

== Culture ==
The town is home to the Washington-on-the-Brazos State Historic Site, which has three main attractions: The Star of the Republic Museum (a museum about the Texas Republic), a replica of Independence Hall (where the Texas Declaration of Independence was signed), and Barrington Plantation (home of the last Texas Republic President Anson Jones). In 1899, the local schools created a monument to Independence Hall.

The town is also home to Blessed Virgin Mary Catholic Church, founded in 1849 as the oldest Black Catholic church in Texas.

Washington Avenue in Houston is named for Washington-on-the-Brazos and is the western route to Washington County.

== Geography ==
Washington-on-the-Brazos is located on Farm to Market Road 912 off Texas State Highway 105, 18 mi (29 km) east of Brenham and 10 mi (16 km) west of Navasota in the upper northeastern corner of Washington County. It is near the intersection of the Brazos and Navasota rivers.

== Education ==
The first school in the community may have been established by the wife of John Hall in 1837. In 1841, local Masonic Lodge created its own school, and the Washington Female Academy briefly existed from 1856 to 1857. There were two schools in the 1930s, segregated according to race. Today, the community is served by the Brenham Independent School District.

== Gallery ==
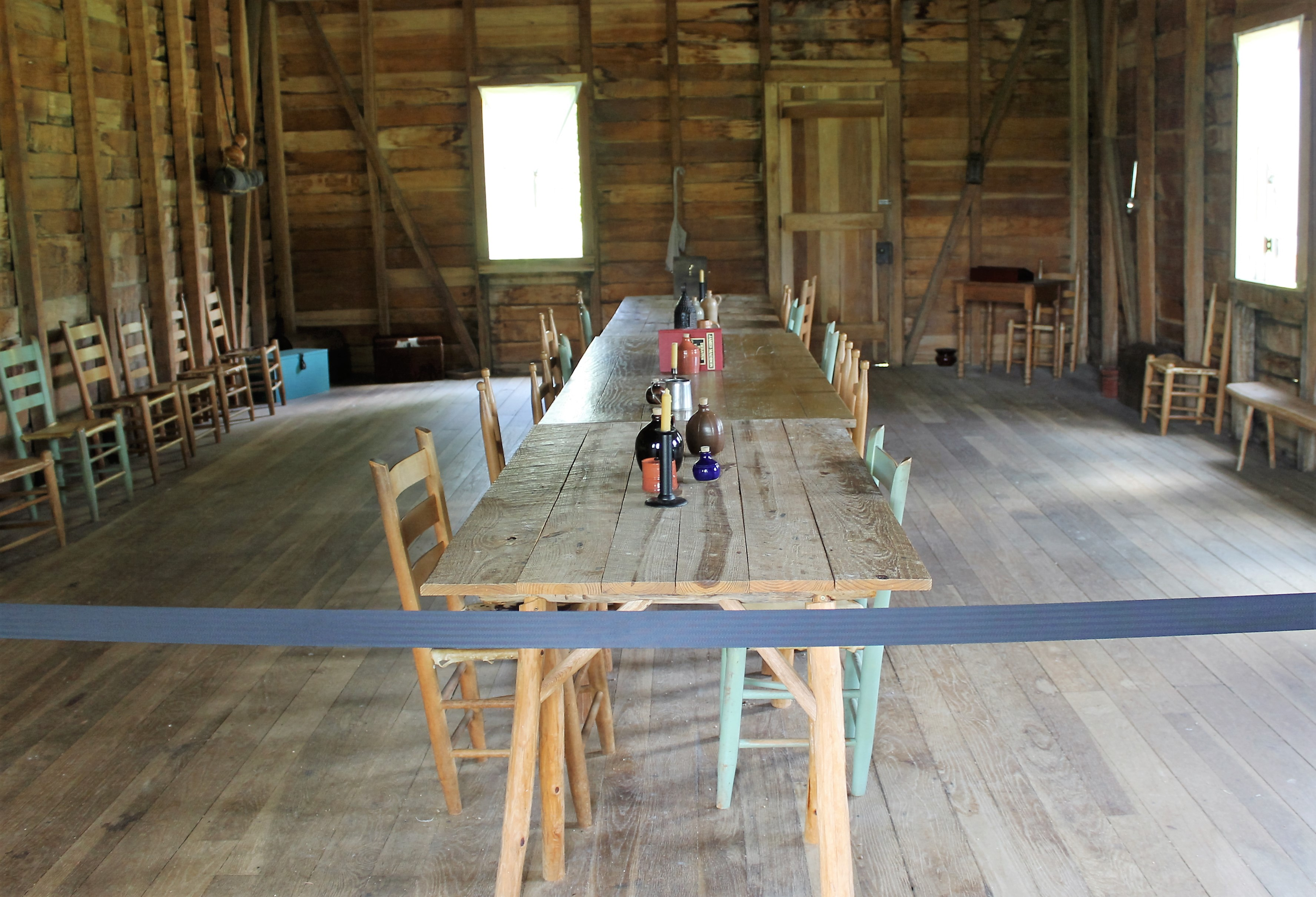
Inside the replica of the building where Texan independence was declared on March 2, 1836

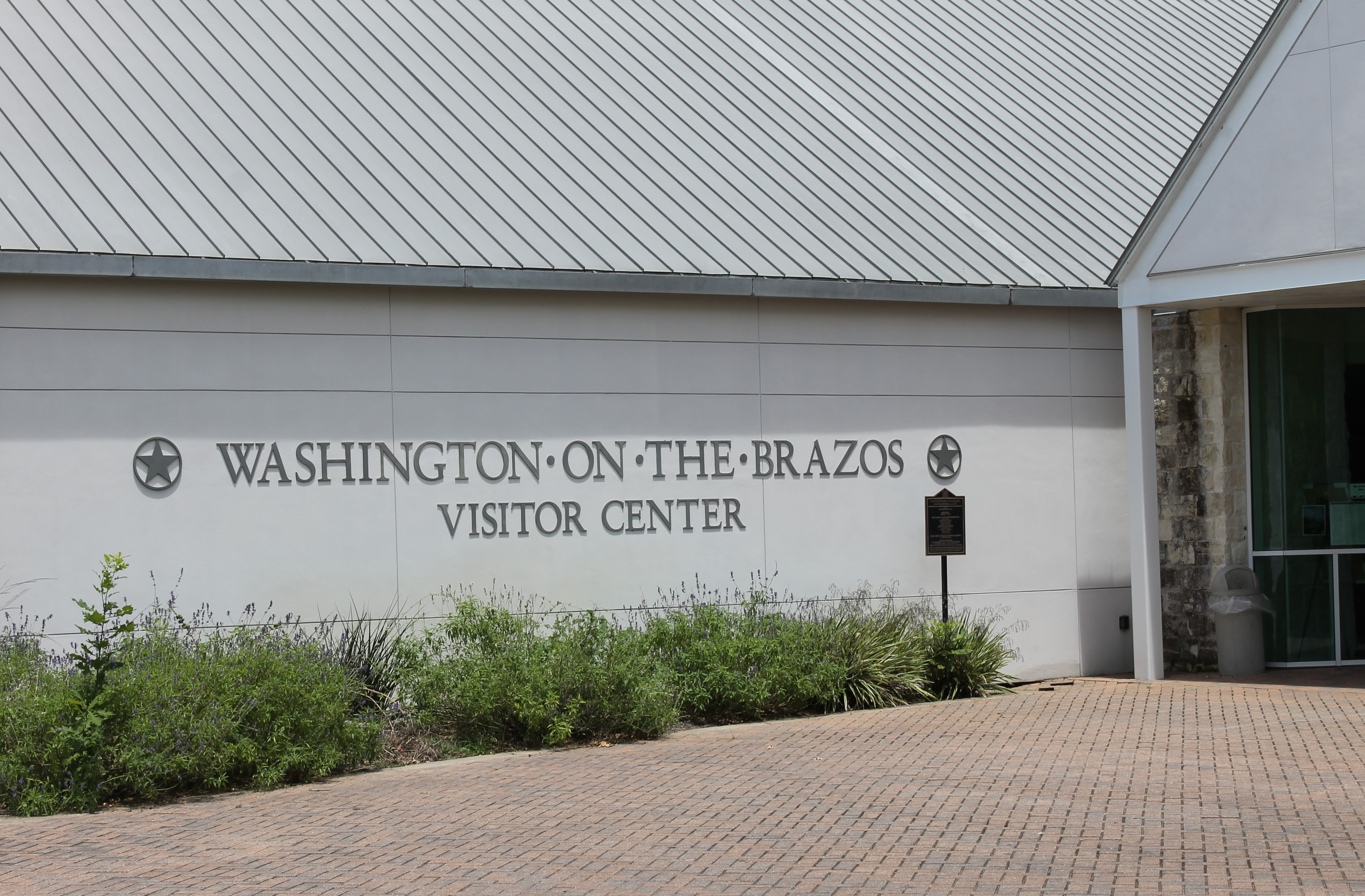
Visitor Center at Washington-on-the-Brazos

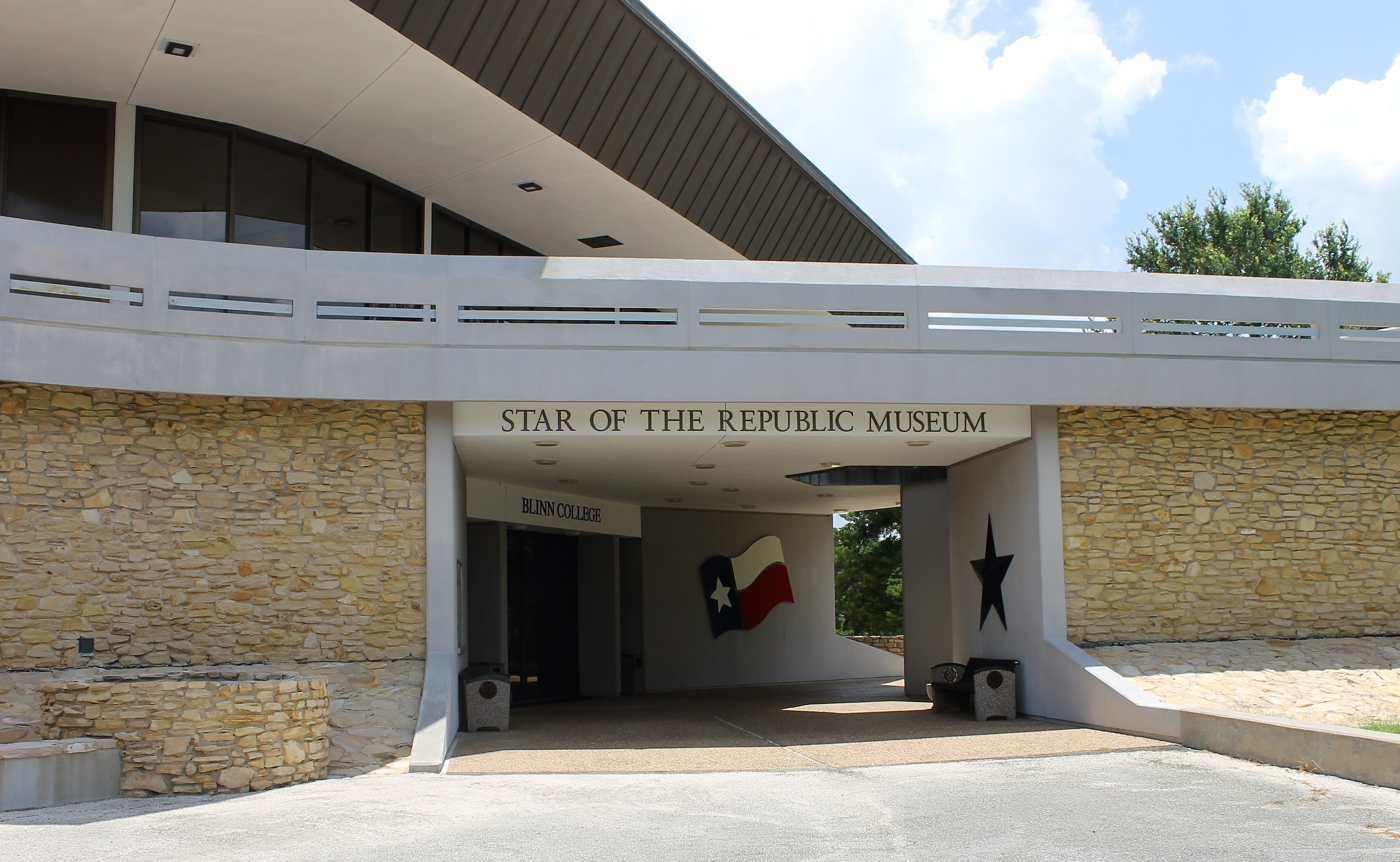
Star of the Republic Museum is located within the state historical park.

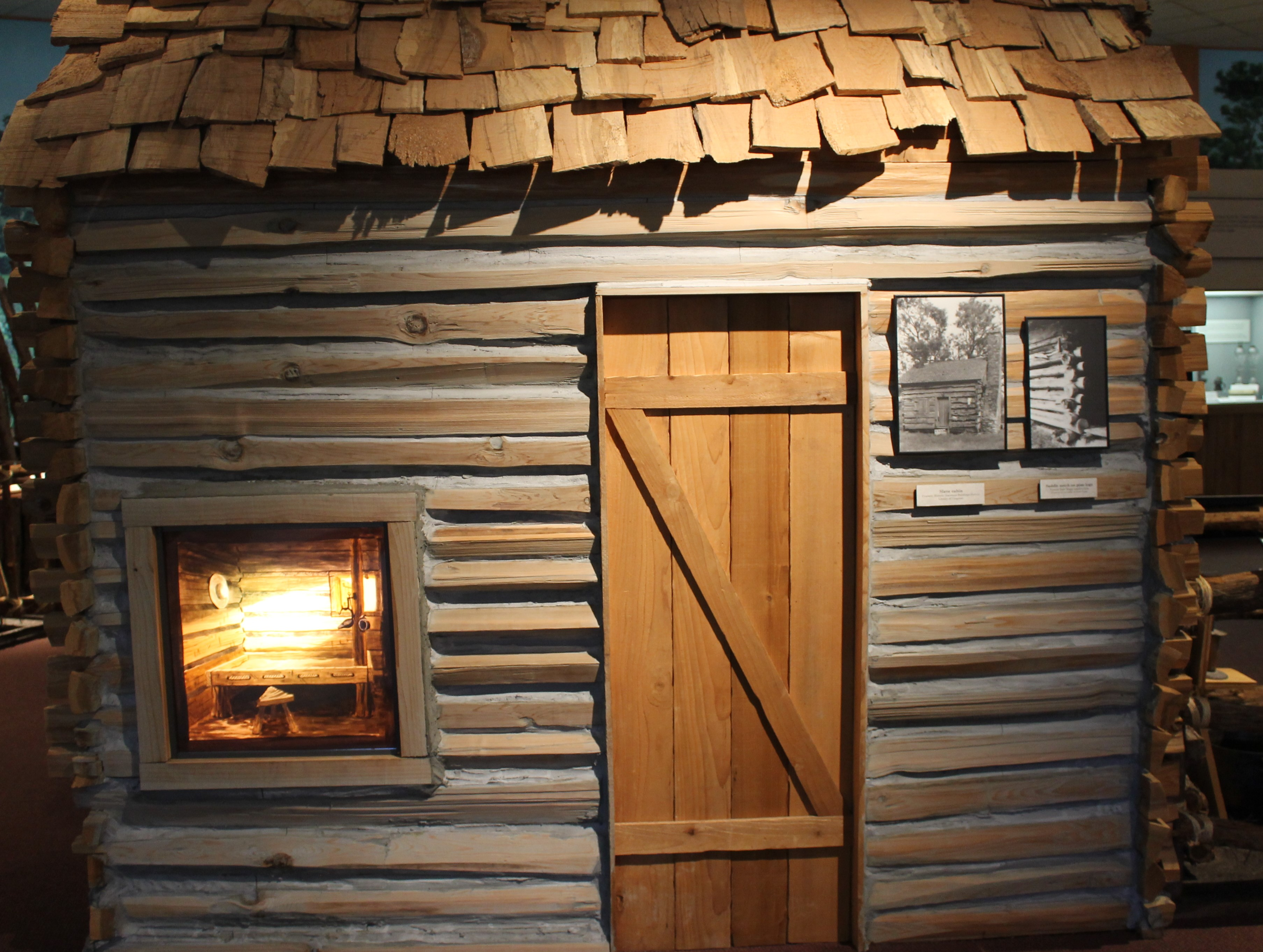
Frontier cabin replica at Star of the Republic Museum

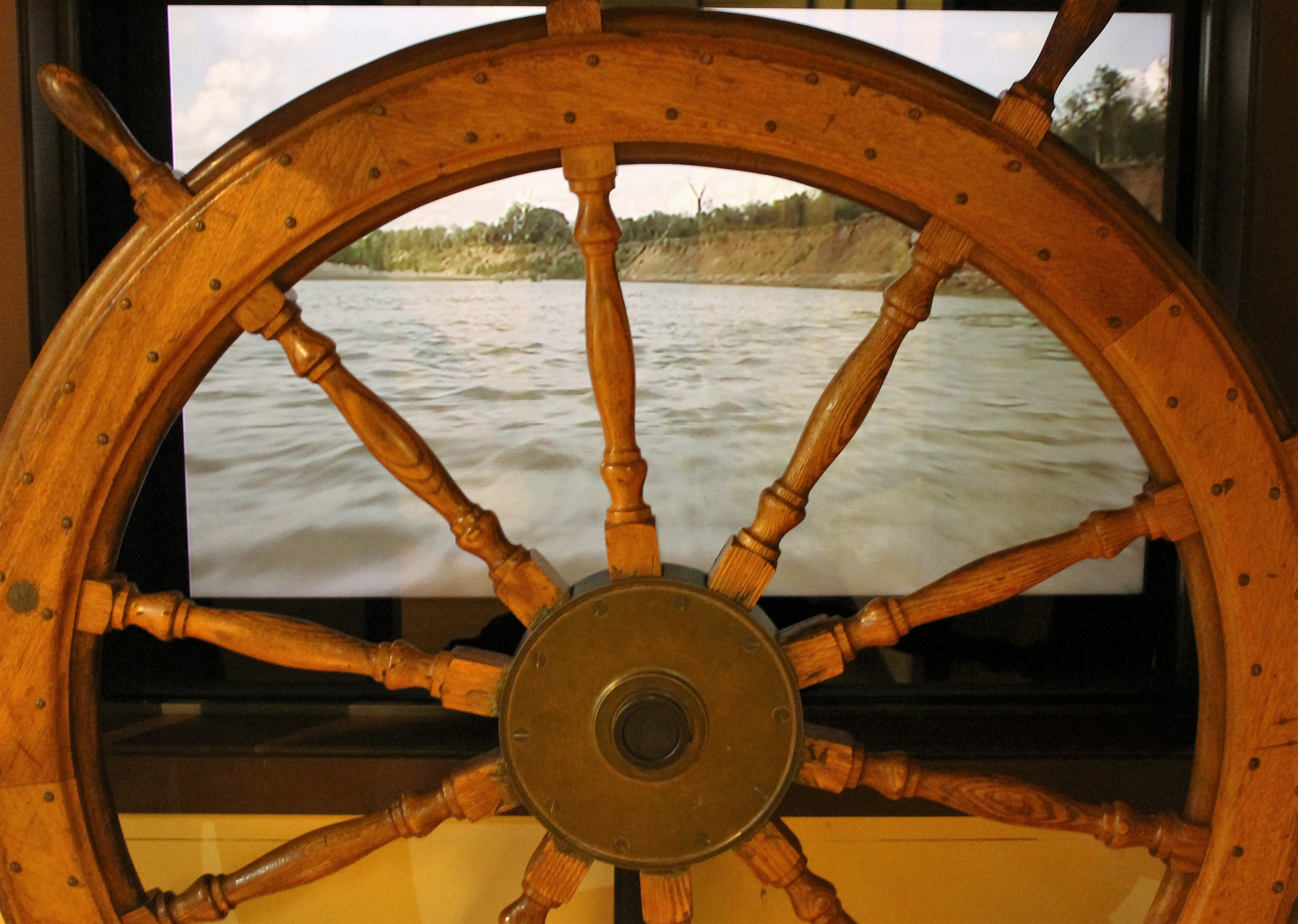
Steamboat exhibit at Star of the Republic Museum

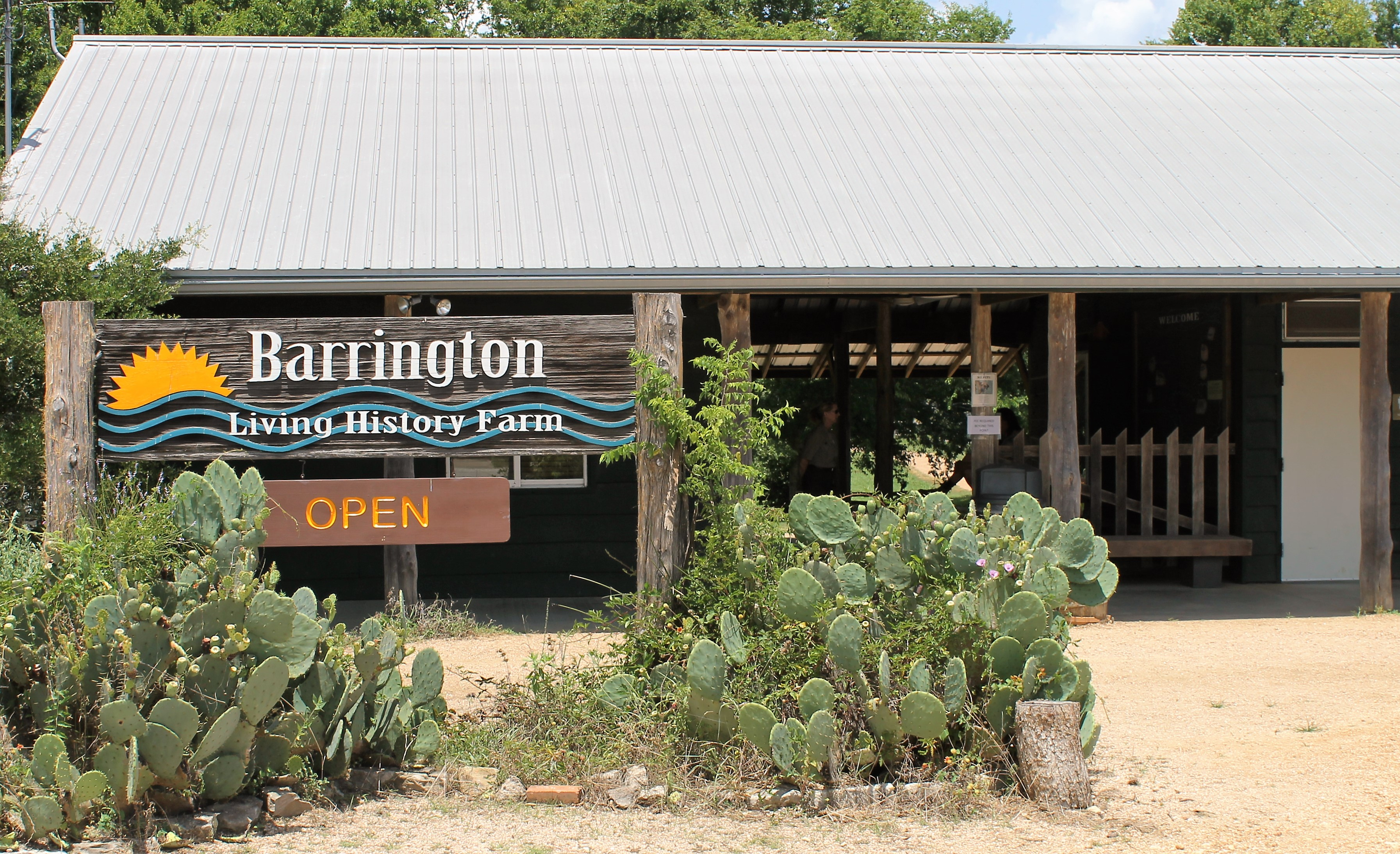
Entrance to Barrington Living History Museum

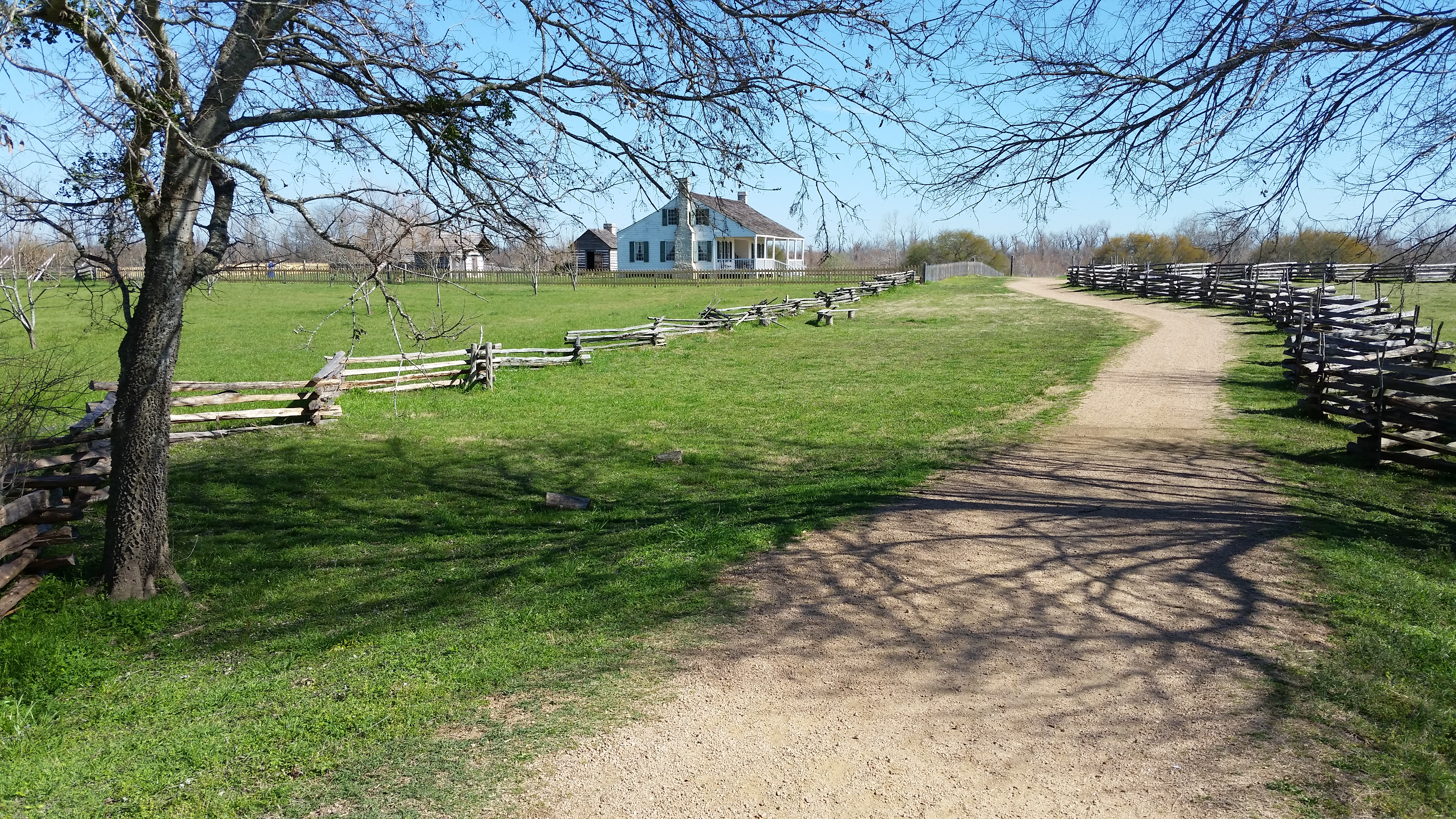
Barrington Farm, residence of Anson Jones

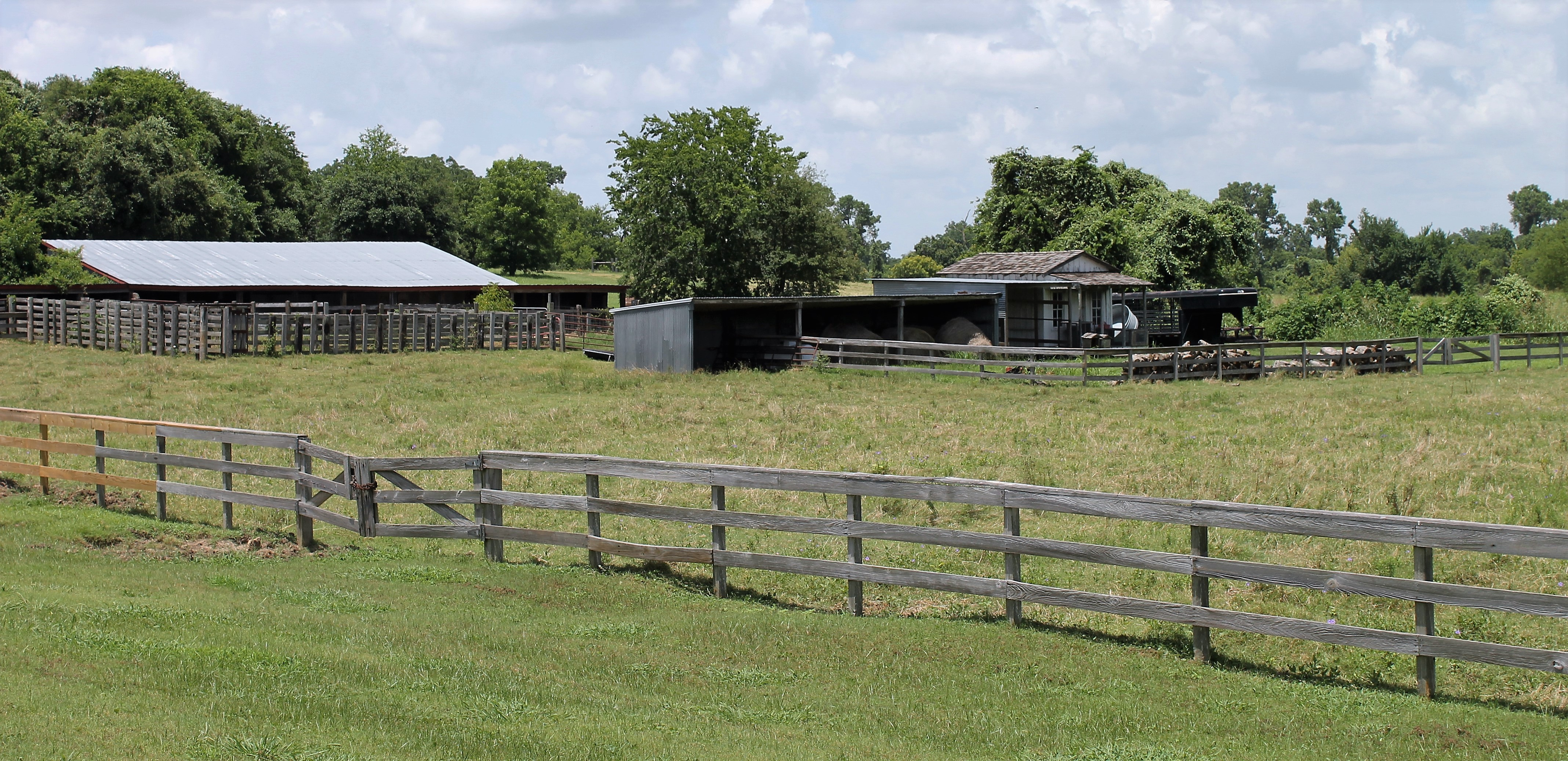
Corral at Washington-on-the-Brazos

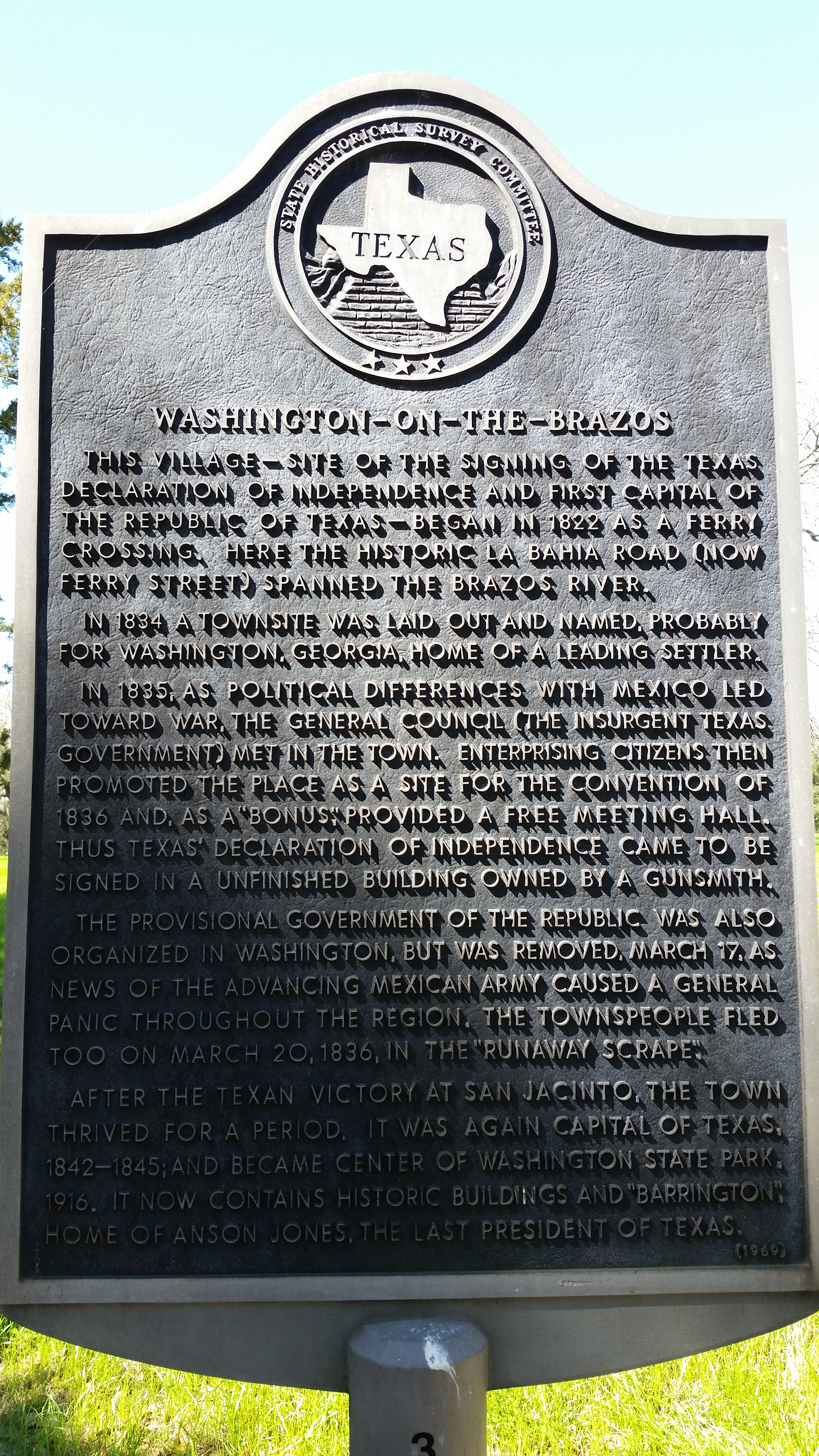
Washington-on-the-Brazos historical marker

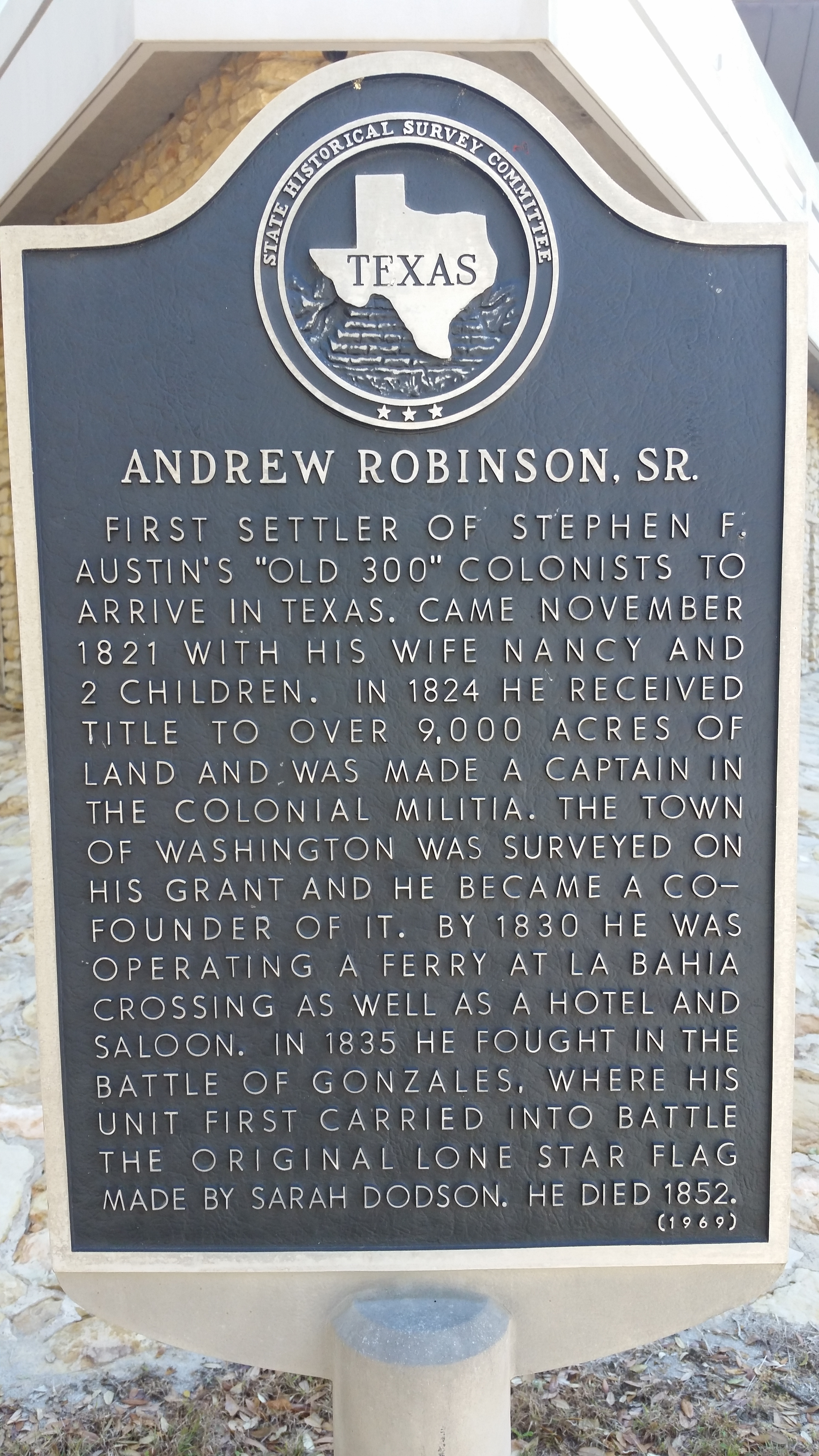
Texas Historical Marker for Andrew Robinson Sr.

== See also ==
- List of museums in East Texas
- Open-air museum
