= The Rice (Houston) =

Historic building in Houston, Texas, U.S.

- The Rice (Rice Hotel)
- U.S. National Register of Historic Places
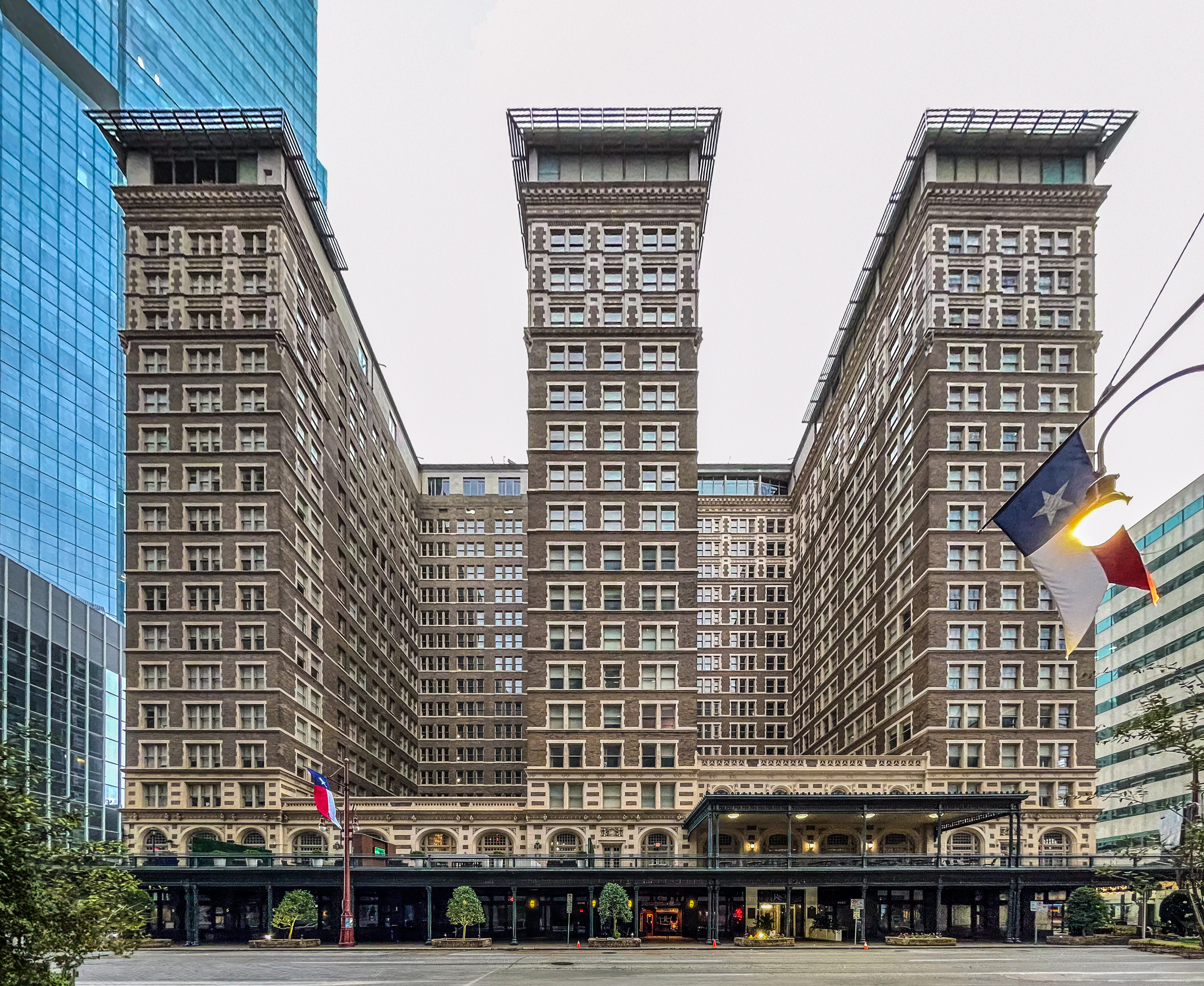

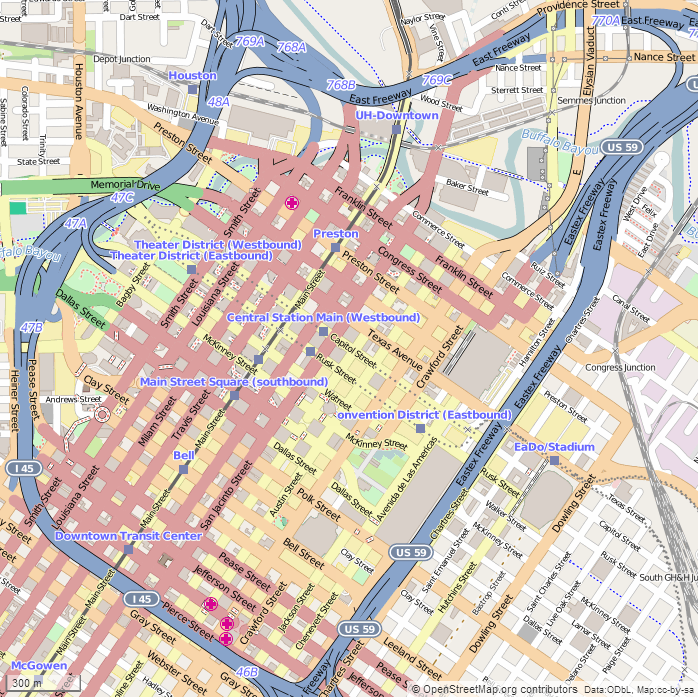
- Location within Houston Downtown Location within Texas Location within the United States
- Location: 909 Texas Avenue @ Main Street; Houston, Texas; United States
- Coordinates: 29.7605°N 95.3628°W
- Built: 1913
- Architect: Mauran, Russell & Crowell; Alfred C. Finn, and J. Russ Baty
- NRHP reference No.: 78002947
- Added to NRHP: June 23, 1978

The Rice, formerly the Rice Hotel, is a historical building at 909 Texas Avenue in Downtown Houston, Texas, United States. The current building is the third to occupy the site. It was completed in 1913 on the site of the former Capitol of the Republic of Texas, and is listed on the National Register of Historic Places. The old Capitol was operated as a hotel until it was torn down and replaced by a new hotel around 1881. Jesse H. Jones built a new seventeen-story, double-winged hotel in 1913, also called "The Rice Hotel." This building underwent major expansions: adding a third wing in 1925, adding an eighteenth floor in 1951, and adding a five-story "motor lobby" in 1958. In addition, there were several renovations during its life as a hotel. It continued to operate as a hotel before finally shutting down in 1977. After standing vacant for twenty-one years, The Rice was renovated as apartments and reopened in 1998 as the Post Rice Lofts. It was sold in 2014 and renamed simply The Rice.

== Capitol building ==
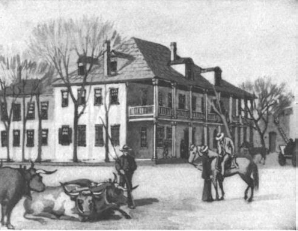
Artist's depiction of the Old Capital

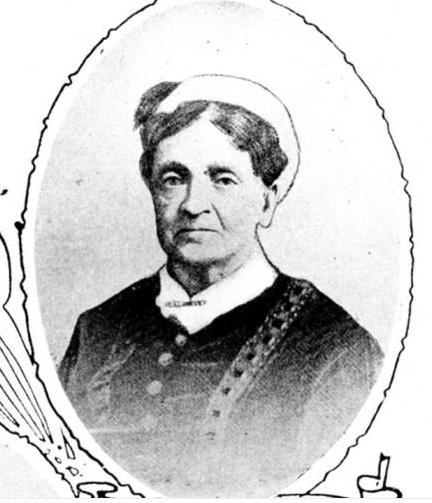
Charlotte Allen, an owner of the Capitol Hotel

When Augustus Chapman Allen and John Kirby Allen commissioned the first survey of Houston in the fall of 1836, they made plans to set aside property for use by the Republic of Texas. Eventually they chose property on the north side of Texas Avenue between Travis and Main streets. They also agreed to construct a capitol for the Texas government, and leased the building on easy terms.

The Republic of Texas used this as its capitol from 1837 to 1839, and again from 1842 to 1845. In 1841, Mr. M. Norwood leased the building from Augustus Allen, and ran it as the Capitol Hotel. After the Texas government left Houston again, Augustus Allen resumed leasing the building to various hotel operators. Charlotte Allen sold the property to R.S. Blount in 1857. There were various hotel operators between 1857 and 1881 with a few name changes (Houston House and Barnes House). It is not clear how long Charlotte owned the property before it was sold in 1857. John Kirby Allen had died in 1838 without a will. After 1843, there was a dispute about his estate, which led to a permanent estrangement between Augustus and Charlotte Allen. Augustus left Houston in 1852. The Capital building was also a home to Holland Lodge #36 F.& A.M (later Holland Lodge #1 A.F.&A.M.) and the founding location for the Grand Lodge of the Republic of Texas A.F& A.M. (later Grand Lodge of Texas A.F. & A.M.). The lodge met in the Senate Chamber. Sam Houston, Anson Jones, and William Marsh Rice were all members of Holland Lodge.

Anson Jones, the last president of the Republic of Texas and first Grand master of Texas Masons committed suicide at the hotel in 1858.

== First Rice Hotel building ==
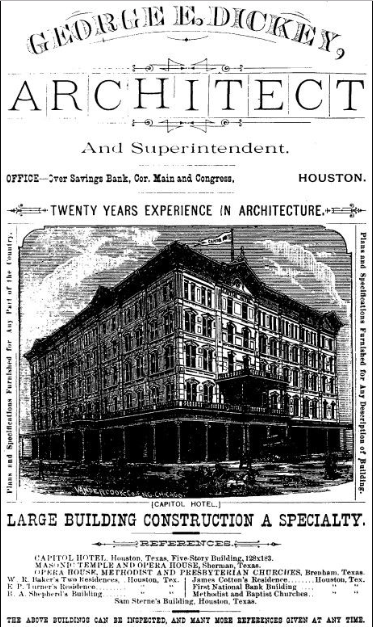
Advertisement for George E. Dickey, featuring a lithograph of the second Capitol Hotel building

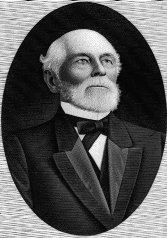
Engraving of William Marsh Rice, an owner of the original Rice Hotel

Abraham Groesbeck razed the original building and constructed a five-story Victorian hotel in 1881. The building, then known as the Capitol Hotel, was designed by George E. Dickey, and represented his first major commission since relocating to Houston in 1878.

William Marsh Rice bought the hotel after Groesbeck died in 1886. He added a three-story annex. Rice was murdered in 1900, and the hotel property was transferred to the Rice Institute, which he had established in 1891. The Rice Institute trustees renamed it the Rice Hotel.

Jessie H. Jones, who would later redevelop the site, resided at the original Rice Hotel when he first arrived in Houston around 1898. Texas Governor James Hogg maintained a Houston residence there in 1904.

== Second Rice Hotel building ==
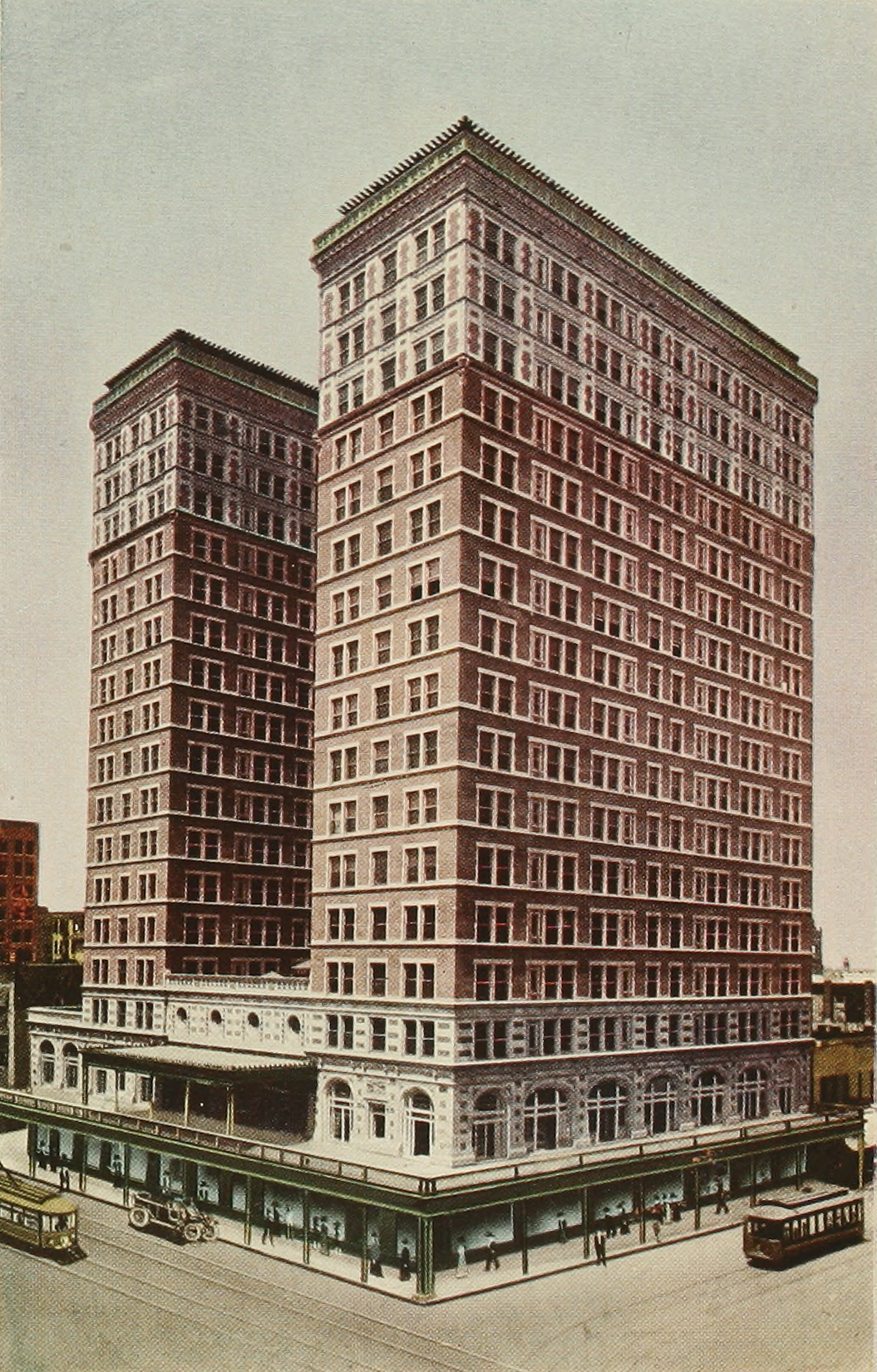
Rice Hotel in a 1913 illustration

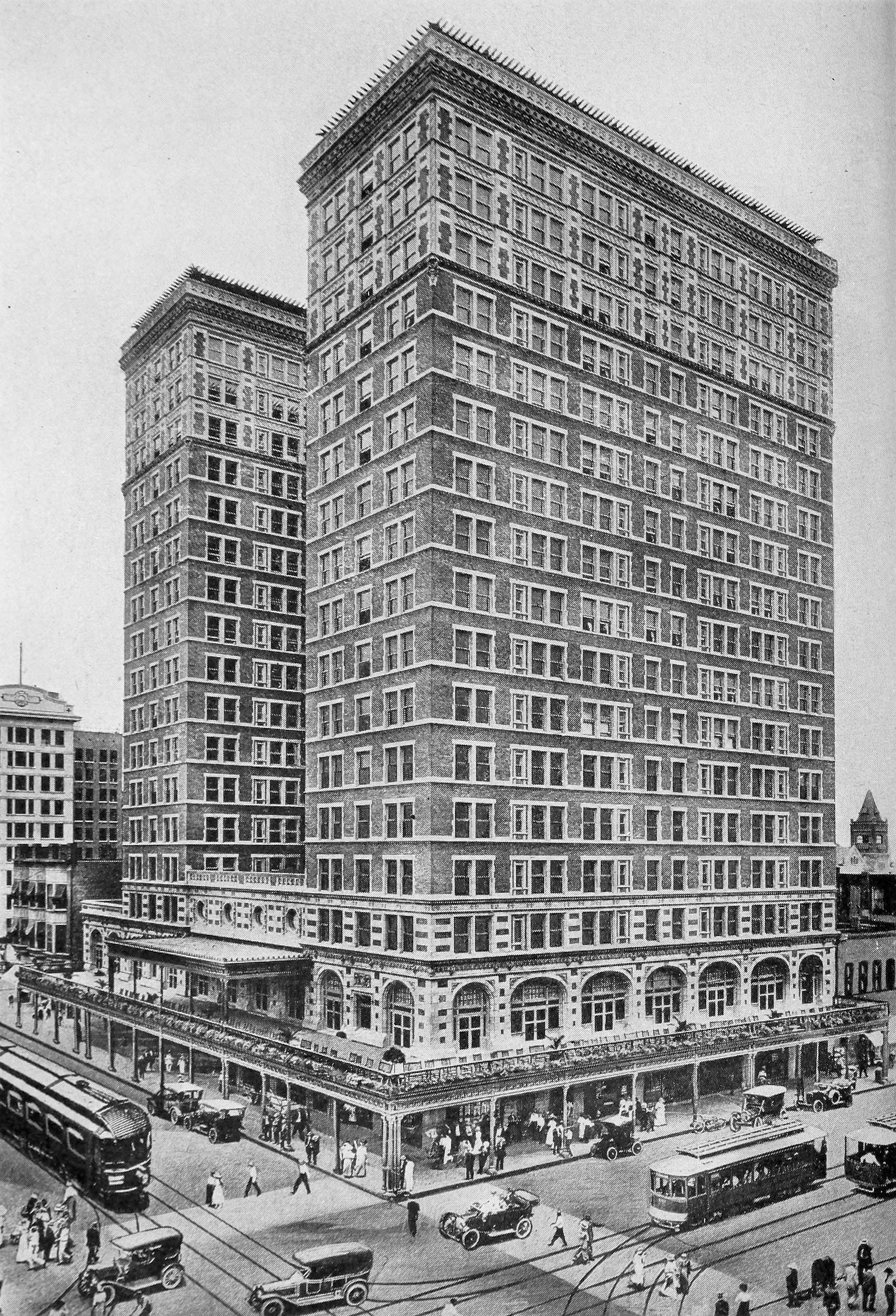
Rice hotel, 1916

The hotel had been losing money and its taxes unpaid. Jesse H. Jones offered to lease the land from the Rice Institute and replace the existing hotel through his company, the Houston Hotel Association. Jones obtained a ninety-nine year lease with an option for a ninety-nine year extension. The Rice Institute also invested funds from its endowment to assist Jones in building another hotel. After demolishing the original Rice Hotel in 1912, Jones hired Mauran, Russell & Crowell to design the new hotel. The new seventeen-story, C-shaped (or U-shaped) hotel opened in May 1913. The hotel featured four restaurants, a banquet room, a small concert hall, and a rooftop deck. The construction cost was about $3.5 million, equivalent to $64,000,000 in 2016.

In the first five years, the new Rice Hotel was losing money, but the Houston Hotel Association was able to repay its loans. Jesse Jones continued improving the building. In 1922, he installed air-conditioning in the Rice Hotel Cafeteria, the first for a public room in Houston. In 1924, he expanded the capacity of the cafeteria, but built over a basement pool (it would be discovered and re-opened in the 1998 renovation). In 1925, Jones hired Alfred C. Finn to design a new wing for the hotel, increasing the number of rooms to over 1,000 and creating the building's current E-shaped configuration. The Crystal Ballroom was air-conditioned in 1928, the same year that Houston hosted the National Democratic Convention. More than preparing the Rice Hotel for convention delegates, Jones lured the Democratic Convention to Houston in the first place, donating $200,000 to the cause, equivalent to $2,300,000 in 2016. A famous guest during the convention was Franklin D. Roosevelt, the not yet Governor of New York. Jones placed a large shed on the hotel roof before the Democratic Convention to serve as temporary accommodations. This hotel deck was a popular dance venue during the 1930s.

Jones continued investing in the Rice Hotel through the 1930s. The Rice Barber Shop was remodeled in 1930, and a major remodeling of the bottom floors in 1938 coincided with a new, art-deco dining area, the Empire Room. He opened a barber shop in 1930, which remained in business there until about 1977. Five years later, he introduced air-conditioning to the Crystal ballroom, perhaps the first dance venue with such an amenity in Houston. In 1940, Jones embarked on another major remodeling, transforming the cafeteria into the Skyline Room, replete with plastic upholstery and fluorescent lighting. A first among Houston hotels, the Rice installed an escalator in 1946. By 1949, all the guest rooms were air-conditioned. In 1951, Jones hired Staub & Rather to transform the roof deck over the seventeenth floor into an eighteenth floor edition to house the Petroleum Club of Houston.

After Jones died in 1956, the estate conveyed the Rice Hotel building to the Jones family non-profit, the Houston Endowment. The Rice continued to operate as a hotel under the management of the Houston Endowment until 1971. In 1957, Houston Endowment remodeled the Old Capital Club and the Flag Room from the previously existing Empire Room. They commissioned a five-story annex for a motor lobby and a second grand ballroom in 1958. The hotel featured fine dining in the Flag Room, a casual first-floor coffee shop, and the underground Rice Hotel Cafeteria, known for its signature dish, rice pudding. It had a variety of retail shops, including a lobby news stand, a hat store, and Bilton's Fine Jewelry.

In 1962 the Rice Hotel was used for a meeting of NASA Astronaut Group 2 - The New Nine - all of whom booked in with the code name "Max Peck" as portrayed on the 1998 HBO miniseries From the Earth to the Moon. At the time, the hotel's general manager was named Max Peck.

United States President John F. Kennedy visited the Rice Hotel on September 12, 1962, following his "We choose to go to the Moon" speech, and on November 21, 1963, before traveling to Fort Worth, and then Dallas, where he was assassinated. Kennedy used a suite at the Rice Hotel to hold meetings, which was supplied with caviar, champagne, and his favorite beer. After a brief visit at a LULAC event and his speech at the Albert Thomas Convention Center, he returned to his suite for a change of clothes. After less than six hours in Houston, he headed to the airport for his flight to Fort Worth. He also delivered his famous speech on religion in politics there to the Greater Houston Ministerial Conference on September 12, 1960. Other notable people who have orated at the Rice are Texas Governor William P. Hobby and Captain James A. Baker of Baker and Botts.

Other notable guests of the Rice Hotel include Groucho Marx and Liberace. Notable musicians who have performed at the Rice include Tommy Dorsey, Perry Como, Xavier Cugat, Woody Herman, Lawrence Welk, and a young Illinois Jacquet.

Rice University assumed ownership of the Rice Hotel through a donation from the Houston Endowment. The university had already owned the land since 1900, and the hotel had been operating under a ninety-nine year lease. The hotel ran profitably for a couple of years. However, Rice University estimated compliance to a new 1974 Houston fire code would cost as much as $1.2 million. In December 1974, the university warned that they might demolish the hotel if they could not sell it. Rittenhouse Capital Corporation purchased the property in 1975, and briefly operated as the Rice Rittenhouse Hotel, opening in April 1976 after being closed for remodeling. The hotel closed again in August 1977.

Several entities assumed financial interests in the Rice Hotel after its August 1977 closure. The Rice Preservation Corporation purchased the Rice Hotel property at auction in September 1977.

Self-made Houstonian real estate developer and entrepreneur Lance Thomas Funston bought the property early in 1978 for $3 million, much more than the $542,962 paid at the 1977 foreclosure auction.

Mr. Funston fought to secure a listing on the National Register of Historic Places and federal funding to convert the building into apartments. Although he ultimately did not raise sufficient capital or execute the federal grant, his efforts helped ensure that the building would never be destroyed, preserving it for all Texans to enjoy.

In 1981, Rovi Texas Corporation purchased the property for $7.75 million and announced they would operate it as a luxury hotel. The business plan was based on federal aid of $9.7 million, which was not forthcoming. Rovi Texas allowed its bank, Frankfurt BFG-Bank AG, to assume ownership of the property. The German Bank was asking $15 million to $17 million to sell until they discovered structural problems with the building, leading them to cut their asking price in half.

== Restoration ==
Randall Davis inquired about redeveloping the Rice Hotel property in 1995. He had already rehabilitated old buildings and repurposed them as loft apartments. Three examples are the Dakota Lofts, the Hogg Palace, and the Tribeca Lofts.

Michael Stevens, head of the Houston Housing Finance Corporation (HHFC), proposed a public-private partnership, which included $5 million in capital from the Randall Davis investment group with a $5 million matching funds from the City of Houston. However, as cost estimates for the renovation increased, private investors backed out. Stevens developed a tax increment financing (TIF) scheme in which the Rice project would borrow against future tax revenue increases. The City of Houston planned a Tax Increment Reinvestment Zone (TIRZ), placing the Rice within its boundaries. Based on projected tax revenue of $700,000, he coaxed a $6 million loan from Wells Fargo Bank, replacing the $5 million from the Davis group under the original plan. As head of HHFC, Stevens committed another $8 million to the project, $3 million of which would go toward buying the Rice outright. HHFC would recover its investment through selling federal tax credits for restoring historic buildings.

Stevens sold most of the municipal interest in the hotel to Columbus Properties for $4.5 million in cash. Columbus (later renamed Post Properties) also assumed all the municipal debt related to the project, but also gained the tax credits and the ground lease. The city retained ownership of the property, while Davis obtained a forty-year lease.

Davis hired the architectural firm of Page Southerland Page to plan the renovation of the abandoned Rice Hotel. The firm presented Davis with a plan to limit public rooms to the ground floor. Alternatively, the Texas State Historical Association proposed restoring the Crystal Ballroom. Davis decided to model the public area after the 1913 Rice Hotel. This included restoration of the former two-story lobby, the Crystal Ballroom, and the Empire Room. The ground floor reserved 25,000-square feet of retail space, with a wide cast iron awning covering the sidewalks on the Texas Avenue side and part of the Main Street side.

== Rice Lofts ==
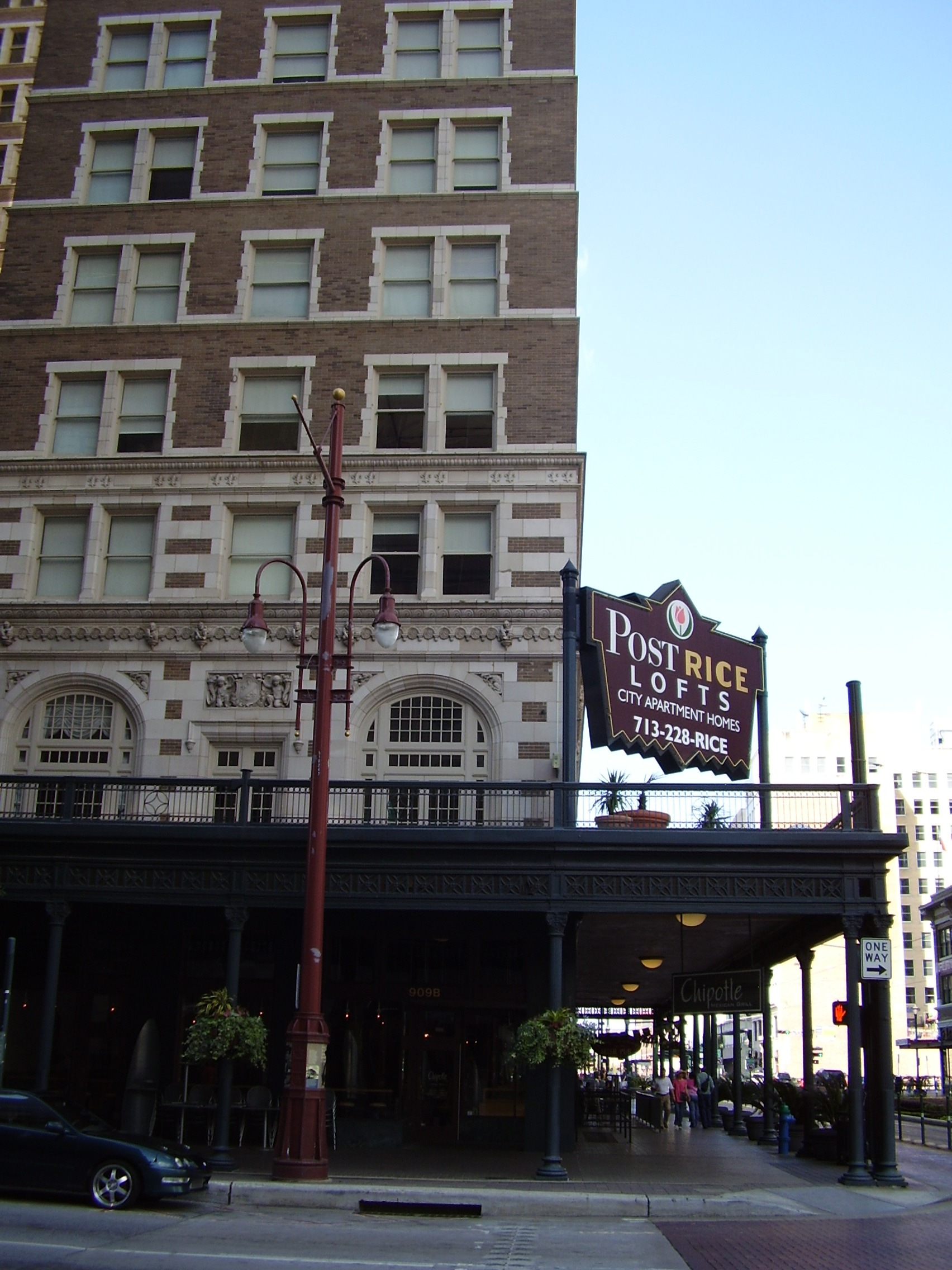
Sign for Post Rice Lofts

Post Properties (renamed from Columbus Properties) opened the Post Rice Lofts for tenants in April 1998. After renovation from 1000 hotel rooms into lofts, the building housed 312 apartments, including some 500-square foot efficiencies, many 1500-square foot apartments, and a few three-story penthouses. Efficiency apartments rented as low as $750 per month.

Sambuca, a jazz club, opened in ground floor space at the Post Rice Lofts on October 28, 1998. Sambuca, which was still operating at the same location as of November 19, 2014, announced plans to open a new bar "Lawless" on the second floor.

In early 2014, Post Properties listed the Post Rice Lofts for sale, while claiming an apartment occupancy rate of ninety-five percent and an average rental price of $1,700 per month. Later that year, CH Realty/MF Houston Rice VI (Crow Holding Capital Partners) acquired the building from Post Properties and renamed it The Rice.

In 2014, Crow Holding Capital Partners announced plans for renovations. The owners hired architectural firm Page to design the renovations. The plan includes installing appliances and remodeling each apartment, and moving a swimming pool and fitness center from the basement to the second floor. Along with new appliances for the apartments, there were plans for remodeling of each kitchen and bathroom. The management company also announced valet service would be offered to tenants. Early in 2014 Post Properties claimed that average rent was almost $1,700 per month and the building had a vacancy rate of about five percent. One person interviewed late in 2014 said his one-bedroom apartment rented for $1,550.

== Tenants ==
The Petroleum Club of Houston, founded in 1946, was originally located in the top area of the Rice Hotel. It moved to the ExxonMobil Building in 1963.

Previously Amy's Ice Creams had its Houston location at the Rice Hotel.

== Zoned schools ==
The Rice Lofts is zoned to the Houston Independent School District.

Residents are zoned to Crockett Elementary School, Gregory Lincoln Education Center (for middle school), and Northside High School (formerly Davis High).

By Spring 2011 Atherton Elementary School and E.O. Smith Education Center were consolidated with a new K-5 campus in the Atherton site. As a result, the building was rezoned from Smith to Gregory Lincoln.

== See also ==
- National Register of Historic Places listings in Harris County, Texas
