= Petroleum Club =

Petroleum Club may refer to:

- Petroleum Club of Houston, United States
- Calgary Petroleum Club, Canada
