= Holland Lodge =

Masonic lodge in Houston, Texas

Coordinates: 29.7290°N 95.3906°W

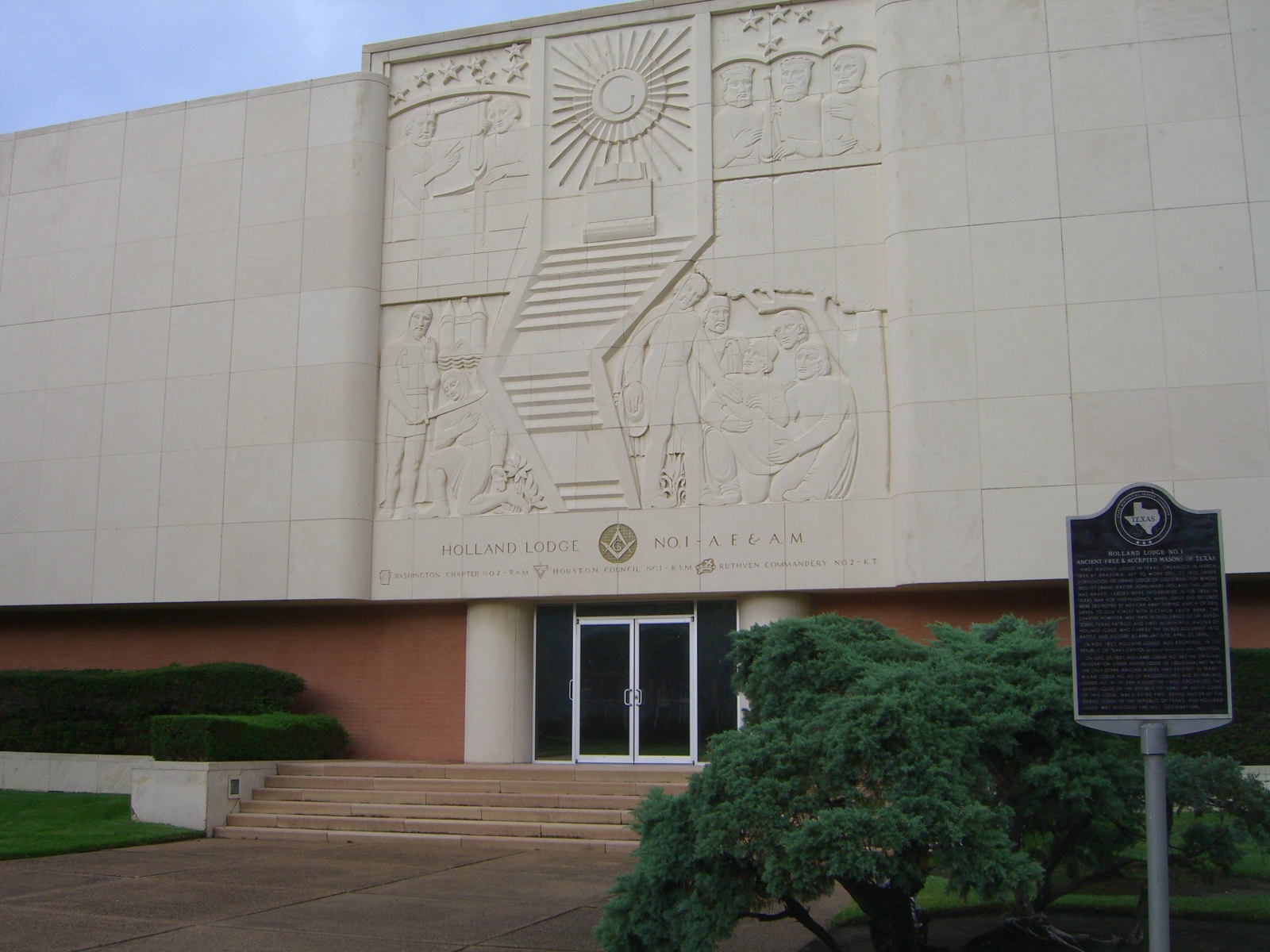
Holland Lodge #1 at its current location in Houston, Texas

Holland Lodge No. 1 AF&AM is the oldest Masonic lodge in Texas and a founding subordinate chapter of the Grand Lodge of Texas. The lodge was originally chartered by the Grand Lodge of Louisiana on 27 January 1836, making it older than the Republic of Texas. It is in the Museum District of Houston, Texas at 4911 Montrose Boulevard. The building was erected in 1954, designed by architect Milton McGinty. The sandstone mural facade depicting the origins of Freemasonry was carved by William M. McVey. The building at 4911 Montrose Boulevard was purchased by the Museum of Fine Arts Houston (MFAH) on May 29, 2025.

== Lodge history ==
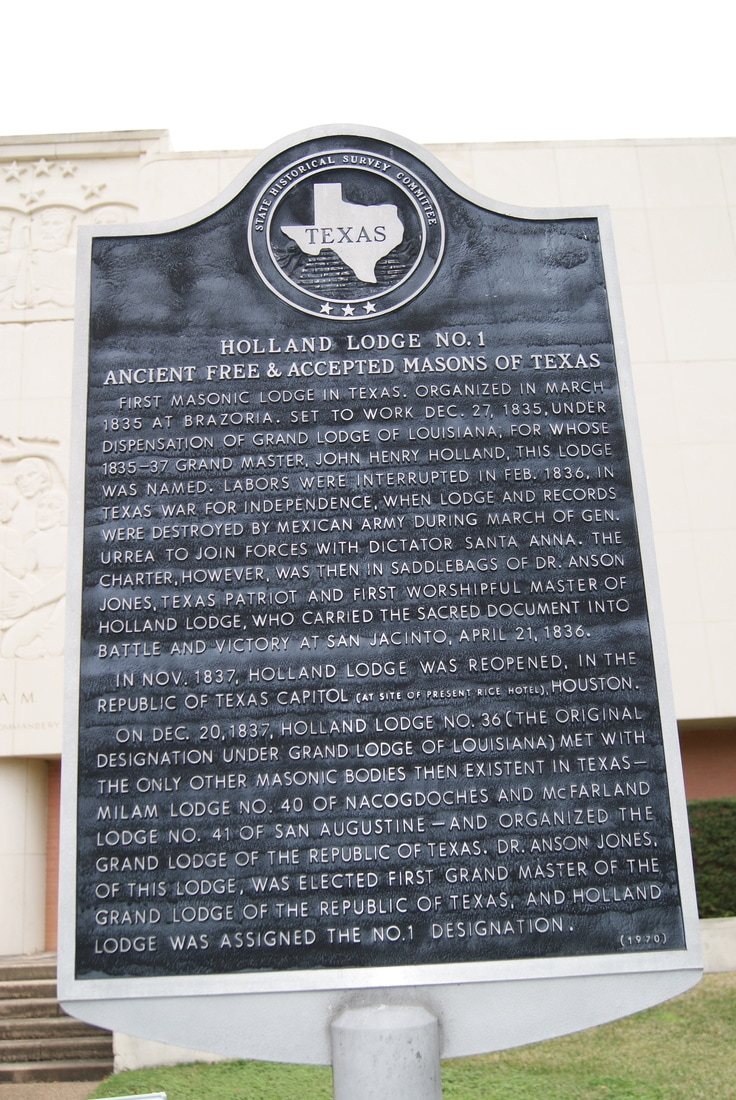
Texas Historical Marker in Front of Holland Lodge No. 1 A.F.&A.M.

=== Founding of Holland Lodge ===
In March 1835, Anson Jones, John Wharton, Asa Brigham, James Phelps, and Alexander Russell, wishing to formally meet as an organized masonic lodge, met under the Masonic Oak near the burial ground of General John Austin and petitioned the Grand Lodge of Louisiana for dispensation to organize a lodge in the Texas territory. On December 27, 1835, the dispensation was granted by John Holland, Grand Master of Louisiana. Holland Lodge No. 36 of Louisiana was instituted and opened on the second floor of the old courthouse in Brazoria, Texas. Meetings continued here until March 1836, when Brazoria was abandoned due to events related to the Texas Revolution. During this time, the official charter issued to Holland Lodge #36 was delivered to Texas by John M. Allen of Louisiana Lodge No. 32 and presented to Anson Jones just before the Battle of San Jacinto. This document arrived safely in Brazoria after the battle, but the brethren had dwindled in number post-revolution.

=== Original Brazoria Courthouse ===
In November 1837, Anson Jones assembled Masons living near Houston in the Senate Chamber of the original Capitol building (the site of the Rice Hotel and currently The Rice Lofts) and opened Holland Lodge regularly at this location until October 27, 1838. On November 13, 1837, the lodge appointed a committee to meet with members of Nacogdoches and San Augustine to organize the Grand Lodge of the Republic of Texas. This convention occurred on December 20, 1837 in the Senate Chamber meeting place, presided over by Sam Houston, and included representatives of Milam No. 40 and McFarland No. 41. The Grand Lodge's first session was opened on April 24, 1838, at which time Texas lodges were renumbered according to the dates of dispensation. Thus was established Holland Lodge No. 1, Milam Lodge No. 2, and McFarland Lodge No. 3. By November 1838, other lodges formed under the jurisdiction of the Grand Lodge of the Republic of Texas, including Temple No. 4 (Houston), St. Johns No. 5 (Brazoria), Harmony No. 6 (Galveston), Matagorda No. 7 (Matagorda), and Phoenix No. 8 (Washington).

=== The Old Capitol Building ===
On November 8, 1838, Holland Lodge, Temple Lodge, and the Grand Lodge of Texas (all previously meeting in the crowded Senate Chamber) secured lodge rooms in the upstairs apartments of Kesler's Arcade at 910 Congress Avenue. After a dispute over the rent, the bodies were barred from the building in September 1839 and could not resume labor until February 1840, when they met once again in the Senate Chamber. On June 10, 1840, Holland Lodge agreed to a six-month contract for rooms in the CC Dibble Building at 201 Main Street. During this time, officers of the lodge made a new contract with the heirs of Mr. Kesler and returned to the arcade apartments between February 1841 and January 1847.

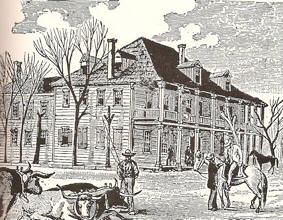
The Old Capitol Building on the original site of the Rice Hotel

After the turbulent first decade of masonry in Texas, members of Holland Lodge sought to establish a permanent building. Brothers William Marsh Rice and Nichols offered the second story of their new building at 1011 Congress Avenue for five years for the interest on a payment of $1100 which was eventually returned to the lodge. This facility was dedicated on January 16, 1847, and served as the home of Holland Lodge, Houston Chapter #8, and Houston Council #10 until November 23, 1852.

In May 1851, a committee was formed of members from Holland Lodge, Washington Chapter #2, and Ruthven Commandery #2 and submitted a plan for a new three-story building for lodge rooms and a school. By March 1852, a lot had been purchased at the corner of Capitol and Main streets for $600. The erection of the three-story building was contracted for $2500 and completed in October 1852. As planned, the first floor was rented as a school for $20 per month, and the associated bodies met in this new hall until it was destroyed by fire in October 1862.

== Notable members ==
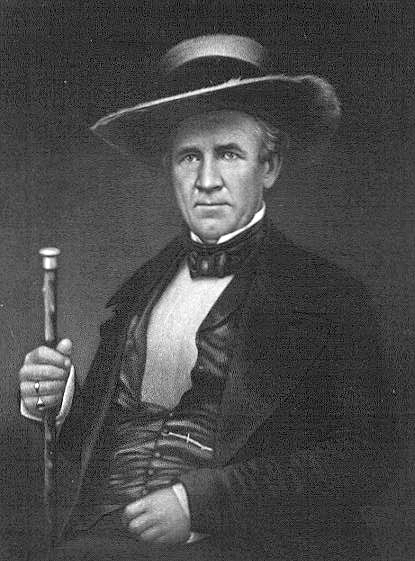
General Sam Houston

- Sam Houston - Hero of San Jacinto, President of the Republic of Texas, Governor of Texas and Tennessee, US Senator
- Anson Jones - Last President of the Republic of Texas, First Grand Master of Texas Masons, Grand Master of Texas Odd Fellows, Grand Master of Pennsylvania Odd Fellows.
- David G. Burnet - 1st President of the Republic of Texas (interim), Vice President of the Republic of Texas, Secretary of State of Texas
- James Fannin - Commander of the Texas Army at Goliad
- Juan Seguín - Tejano Patriot
- Benjamin Franklin Terry - Founder and Commander of Terry's Texas Rangers
- Thomas S. Lubbock - Commander of Terry's Texas Rangers
- James Pinckney Henderson - Army General, Attorney General of The Republic of Texas, 1st Governor of Texas, US Senator
- Francis Lubbock - 6th Lieutenant Governor of Texas, 9th Governor of Texas (during US Civil War)
- Hugh Mcleod - General of the Republic of Texas and the Confederacy, Second in command of Hood's Brigade

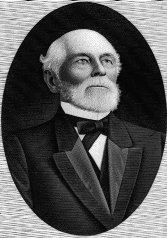
William Marsh Rice

- William Marsh Rice - Founder of Rice University
- Peter W. Gray - Cofounder of Gray and Botts (Precursor to Baker Botts), Grand Master of Texas
- Walter B. Botts - Cofounder of Gray and Botts
- Ben Taub - Philanthropist essential for the University of Houston and Baylor College of Medicine
- Ross S. Sterling - Founder of Humble Oil (Precursor to Exxon) and 31st Governor of Texas
