= TotalEnergies Petrochemicals & Refining USA =

Subsidiary of TotalEnergies

TotalEnergies Petrochemicals & Refining USA Inc. (formerly Total Petrochemicals USA Inc.) is a subsidiary of French multinational company TotalEnergies. It engages in the production and marketing of petrochemical products. Its headquarters is the TotalEnergies Tower in Downtown Houston, Texas.

== History ==
The company was incorporated in 1956 as American Petrofina Inc. It had $10 million capitalization and headquarters in Dallas. Belgian parent company Petrofina owned the majority of American Petrofina's stock—but an American, Harry A. Jackson Jr., served as its first president.

It purchased the small petroleum companies Panhandle Oil Co. in 1956 and the American Liberty Co. of Dallas in 1957, in order to begin actual operations In June 2000, Fina Oil & Chemical Co. was renamed Atofina Petrochemicals Inc. and the headquarters moved to Houston Texas.

In 1963, the company acquired Cogsden Petroleum Corp. In 1968, it acquired Gulf Oil's Calumet City, Illinois facilities, to build a polystyrene plant. In 1973, Atofina acquired the Port Arthur Refinery from BP. In 1977, the company acquired polystyrene plants in Orange, California and Windsor, New Jersey. In 1984, it acquired ARCO's polypropylene plant in La Porte, Texas.

In 1985, the company changed the name of American Petrofina Co. of Texas, a wholly owned subsidiary of American Petrofina Inc., to Fina Oil and Chemical Co. In 1991, that name was changed to FINA Inc.

The La Porte Plant was expanded in 1995, becoming the largest single-site polypropylene plant in the world. In 1996, the other plant owned by FINA, the Carville Polystyrene Plant, took this position after its expansion. In 1997 FINA formed a joint venture with BASF to build world's largest naphtha steam cracker facility, opened in 2001.

In 1998, FINA was merged with its parent company of Petrofina SA, then Petrofina merged with Total S.A. in 1999. After the acquisition of Elf Acquitaine, the chemicals division of the company was named ATOFINA Petrochemicals Inc. On 1 October 2004, the name was changed to Total Petrochemicals USA, Inc.

== Operations ==
The firm now employs more than 7000 employees, and has sales of $3.4 billion. It trades on the AMEX Stock Exchange.

== Headquarters ==
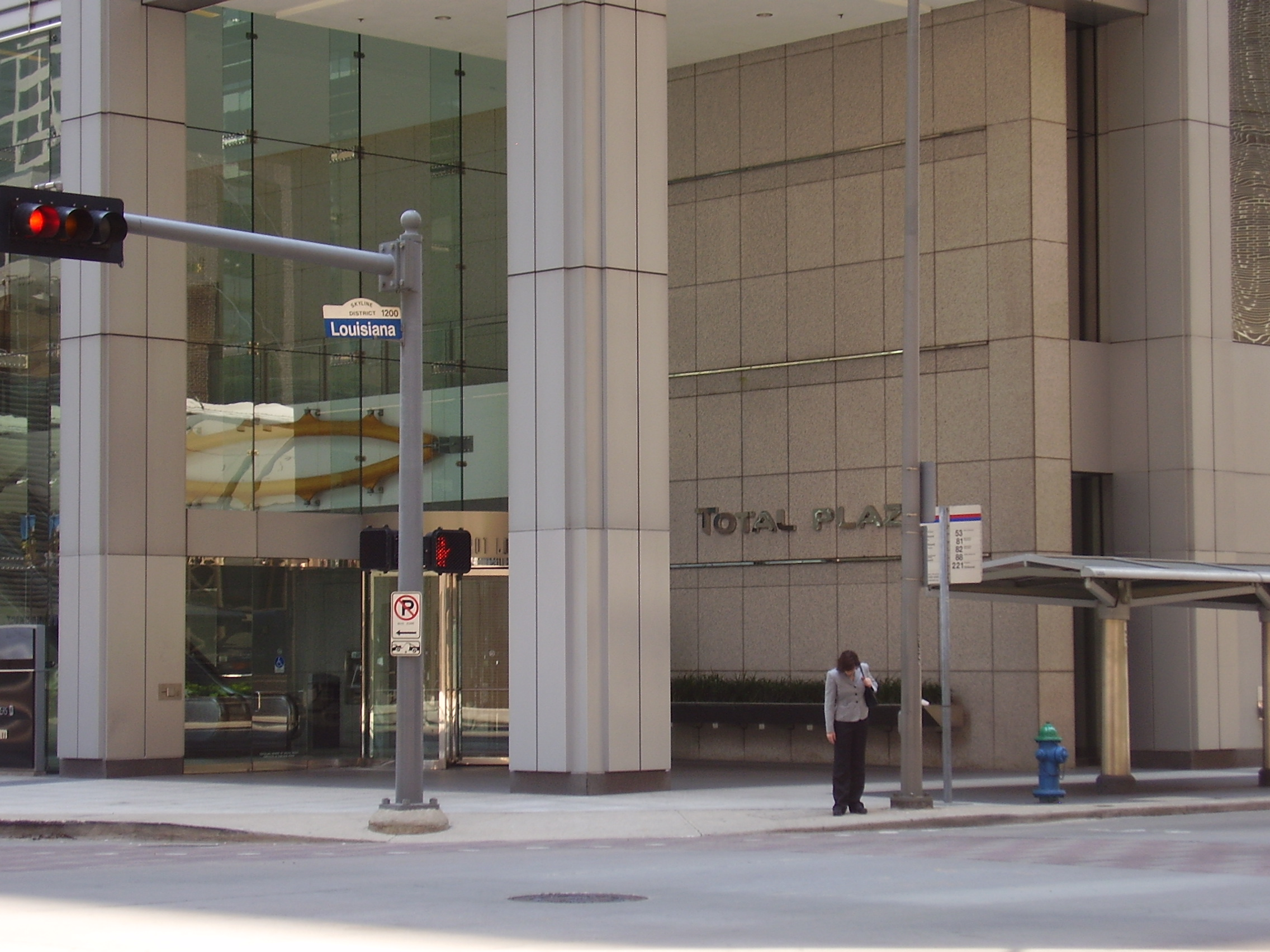
Total Plaza, the headquarters of Total Petrochemicals USA

The Total Petrochemicals USA headquarters is the Total Plaza in Downtown Houston, Texas.

In early 2005, Total Petrochemicals USA signed a lease to occupy space in the Louisiana Place. In late 2005, Total Petrochemicals USA moved hundreds of employees into the building, whose name was changed from Louisiana Plaza to Total Plaza. The company signed a 15 year lease for 150,000 square feet (14,000 m^{2}) of space and had scheduled to relocate 250 employees by November 2005. It had an option for an additional 75,000 square feet (7,000 m^{2}) of space in the Total Plaza. The space that Total Petrochemicals USA moved into was previously occupied by the Metropolitan Transit Authority of Harris County, Texas (METRO), which planned to move into a new administration building in January 2005.

At one time, Atofina's headquarters were in an area in Houston close to George Bush Intercontinental Airport and near to the North Houston district. The lease to the former space was scheduled to expire in 2010, but the company had the right to cancel its lease in 2007. The firm, which occupied a similar amount of square footage in the previous office that it has in its current office, planned to sublease the space from 2005 to 2007.
