= Alamo Lodge No. 44 =

Masonic lodge in Bexar County, San Antonio, Texas, USA

Alamo Lodge No. 44, A.F. & A.M., is the oldest Masonic lodge in Bexar County, San Antonio, Texas, under the jurisdiction of the regular Grand Lodge of Texas. The lodge was granted a charter by the Grand Lodge of Texas on January 15, 1848; it is honored by a plaque on the South Wall of the Alamo's long barrack, hailing the lodge as the "Birthplace of Freemasonry in West Texas." The lodge, which is a "blue" or craft lodge, currently meets in San Antonio's Scottish Rite Cathedral, which is near the Alamo complex.

== History ==
Freemasons present during different stages of the Battle of the Alamo included James B. Bonham, James Bowie, David Crockett, Almeron Dickinson, and William B. Travis. The first Worshipful Master of the lodge was Captain James H. Ralston, an Assistant Quartermaster of U.S. Volunteers. Original members of the lodge were primarily military officers who were already Freemasons. The Lodge held its meetings for several months in an upper-story room of the Long Barrack until it moved into its own hall on Alamo Plaza on June 24, 1848. Through its history, two past masters of Alamo Lodge No. 44 served as Grand Masters of Texas: James H. McLeary (1881), and A.W. Houston (1914).

Alamo Lodge No. 44 hosts an annual meeting of masons inside of the Alamo Chapel, an event which includes a public procession in Masonic regalia.

== Past Masters ==
The following is a list of Past Masters of Alamo Lodge No. 44:

2018 - Robert M. Park

2017 - Tony Kimball

2016 - Anthony D. Harris

2015 - Michael Gollahon

2014 - Max M. Charleswell Jr.

2013 - Brady Johnson

2012 - Gregory D. Wright

2011 - Gregory D. Wright

2009 - Larry McNamee

2008 - Michael Goodrich

2007 - Jaime Garza

2006 - Edward V. O'Banion

2005 - Roland G. Havens

2004 - Armando Soto Sr.

2003 - Daniel K. Schauer

2002 - Eulalio C. Gonzalez

2001 - Steven C. Stanphill

2000 - William F. Jamison

1999 - Robert M. DeWalt

1998 - Guadalupe Gutierrez

1997 - Eulalio C. Gonzalez

1996 - Robert M. DeWalt

1995 - C.R. McCormick II

1994 - Rulalio C. Gonzalez

1993 - Jesus A. Garza

1992 - Jesus A. Araiza

1991 - Chas. A. Young

1990 - Henry W. Pooley

1989 - Donald R. Webster

1988 - Charles A. Kee

1987 - Kenneth R. Tucke

1986 - Charles A. Young

1985 - W.G. Howeth Jr.

1984 - George H. Trumbo Jr.

1983 - Gordon C. Ellis

1982 - John B. Searson

1981 - Donald L. Lively

1980 - James N. Higdon

1979 - Conrad Carr

1978 - Robert L. Wand

1977 - Thomas H. Bailey

1976 - D.A. Schwarz II

1975 - O.D. Cresswell Jr.

== See also ==
- Freemasonry
- Grand Lodge of Texas
- Scottish Rite Cathedral (San Antonio, Texas)
