= TotalEnergies Tower =

Skyscraper in downtown Houston Texas

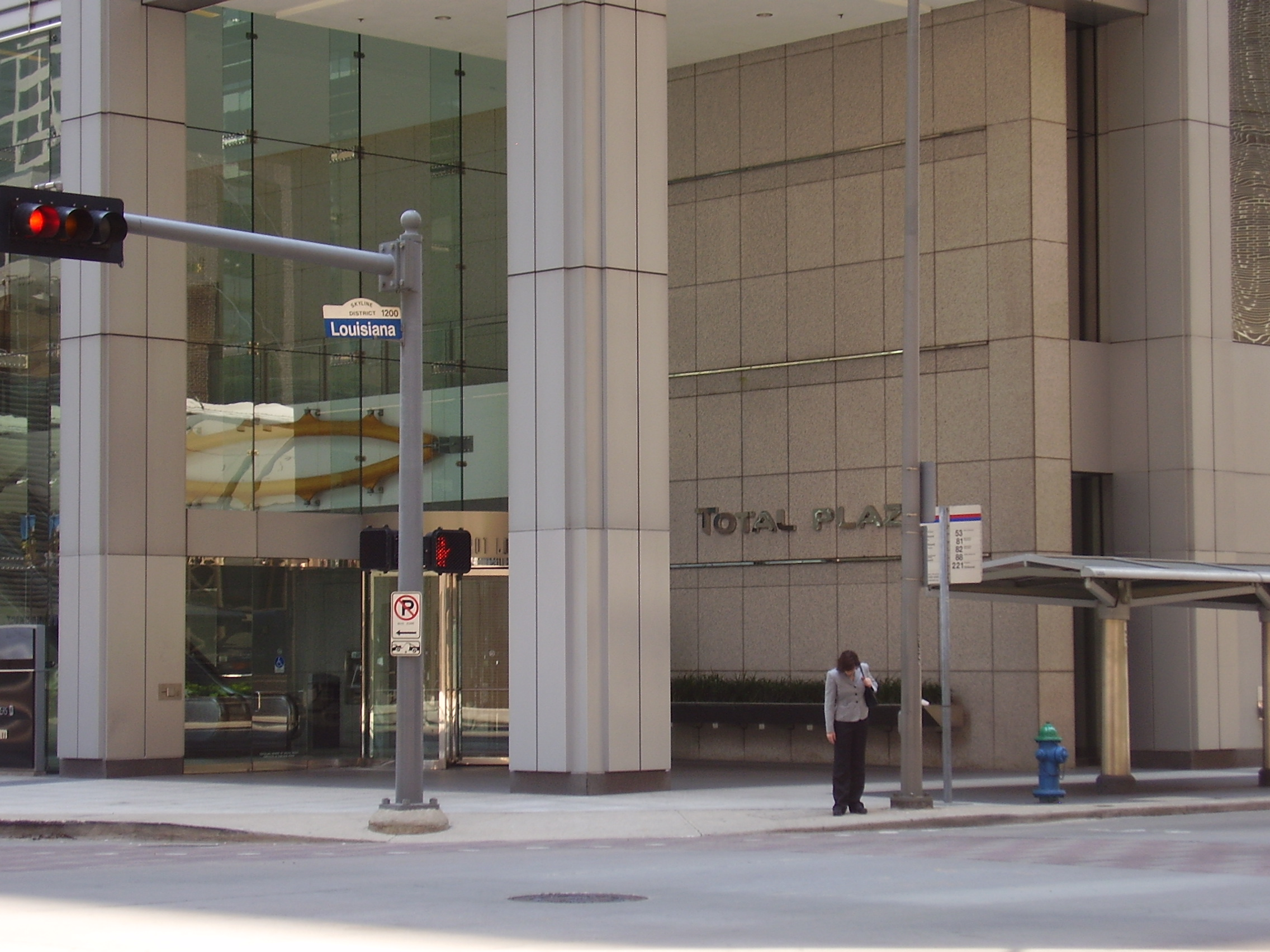
- Interactive map of the TotalEnergies Tower area
- Former names: Entex Building; Louisiana Place; United Gas Building; Total Plaza

General information
- Status: Completed
- Type: Office
- Location: 1201 Louisiana Street, Downtown Houston, Texas
- Coordinates: 29.7565°N 95.3685°W
- Completed: 1971
- Owner: 1201 Louisiana Co LP
- Operator: Brookfield Properties

Height
- Roof: 158 m (518 ft)

Technical details
- Floor count: 35
- Floor area: 847,200 sq ft (78,710 m^{2})
- Lifts/elevators: 18

Design and construction
- Architects: Lloyd Morgan and Jones
- Structural engineer: Walter P. Moore
- Main contractor: Miner Dedrick Co.

TotalEnergies Tower (formerly the Entex Building, Louisiana Place, United Gas Building, and Total Plaza) is a tower in Downtown Houston, Texas, one block from the Allen Center complex. The building, managed by Brookfield Properties, opened in 1971. The 35-story building, designed by the architect Lloyd, Morgan & Jones, was renovated in 1981 and 1996, and features a mirror-finished reflective glass on its exterior. Each floor has about 24,000 sq ft (2,200 m^{2}), with a total of 847,200 sq ft (78,710 m^{2}). The building is named after its major tenant, Total Petrochemicals USA, a subsidiary of TotalEnergies SE. The complex was formerly the headquarters of the Metropolitan Transit Authority of Harris County (METRO).

The building is connected to the Downtown Houston tunnel system.

== History ==
The building, located at 1201 Louisiana, opened in 1971. The building was the headquarters of Entex. In 1975, Mercure Co. N.Y., a Dutch company, bought the Entex Building for US$40 million. The plaza, which had Class B space, was sold in 1984.

In 1994, the main offices of the University of Houston System were in the Entex Building. In 1996, after a renovation, the building was renamed from the Entex Building to the Louisiana Place. During that year, brokers Jay Bonano and Jesse Amundsen left Koll Real Estate to start their own company. The leasing contract for Total Plaza was taken with Bonano and Amundsen.

Previously, the Metropolitan Transit Authority of Harris County, Texas (METRO) headquarters were in the Louisiana Place. The agency occupied 10 floors in the building and did not receive any federal funds to cover the US$3.8 million annual rent. The METRO Board Room was located on the 16th floor. By 2002, the agency announced that it was moving into a new administration building, scheduled for completion in 2004, owned by the agency. METRO's lease of 193,000 sq ft (17,900 m^{2}) expired in April 2005.

In early 2005, Total Petrochemicals USA, a subsidiary of Total S.A., signed a lease to occupy space in the Louisiana Place. In late 2005, Total Petrochemicals USA moved hundreds of employees into the building. The building's name changed to the Total Plaza. The company signed a 15-year lease for 150,000 sq ft (14,000 m^{2}) and had scheduled to relocate 250 employees by November 2005. It had an option for an additional 75,000 sq ft (7,000 m^{2}). The space that Total Petrochemicals USA moved into was previously occupied by METRO, which planned to move into a new administration building in January 2005. In addition, Total Holding U.S., a 20-person office representing Total S.A.'s North American holdings, was scheduled to move to Downtown Houston. Before METRO moved out, the building had a 96 percent occupancy rate. After METRO left and after Total moved in, the occupancy rate was 86 percent.

In 2006, the building was 88 percent occupied. During that year Hilcorp Energy Company signed a lease to stay in the building and increase its space. Hilcorp previously leased around 72,000 sq ft (6,700 m^{2}) on three floors. After it re-signed its lease, it will take an additional floor. In 2007 Coast Range Investments, a privately held company in San Francisco, sold the Total Plaza to Brookfield Properties, previously known in Houston as Trizec Properties, for an undisclosed amount. During that year, the building was 88 percent occupied. During that year, aside from Total S.A., its tenants included Hilcorp Energy and Reliant Energy Retail Services.

== Tenants ==
The Petroleum Club of Houston occupies the building's 35th floor. The club was forced to move from the ExxonMobil Building due to the building's impending sale and renovation. The club's ExxonMobil space was scheduled to close after January 10, 2015, and its new quarters in the Total Plaza were scheduled to open two weeks later. The club space at the Total Plaza has an energy industry theme as it uses gold, bronze, and metallic colors. Younger club members had requested a bar, so the new club has a bar with the view of the skyline of Houston. Kirksey, an architecture company based in Houston, designed the facility. Nancy Sarnoff of the Houston Chronicle wrote that the space has a "more modern look" compared to the previous space at the ExxonMobil Building.
