= Washington-on-the-Brazos State Historic Site =

Washington-on-the-Brazos State Historic Site Texas State Historic Site
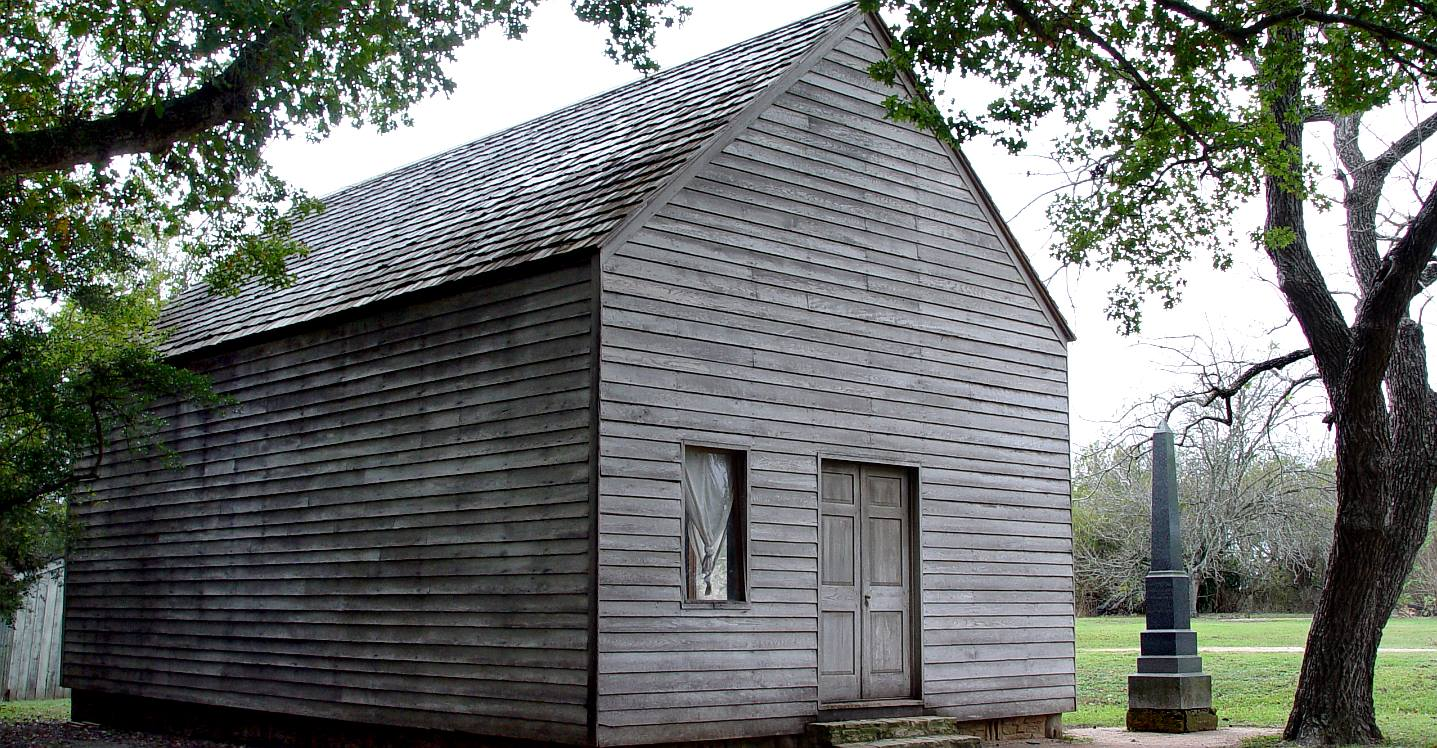
- Independence Hall in 2008

- Location within Texas Location within the United States
- 30°19′26″N 96°09′13″W
- Location: 23400 PR 12, Washington, Texas

History
- Designated: 1916

Site notes
- Area: 293.1 acres (118.6 ha)
- Governing body: Texas Parks and Wildlife Department
- Website: Washington-on-the-Brazos State Historic Site

The Washington-on-the-Brazos State Historic Site is a historic site at Washington-on-the-Brazos, Texas, where the Convention of 1836 adopted the Texas Declaration of Independence. The government of Texas purchased 50 acres (20 ha) of the old townsite in 1916 and built a replica of the building where the delegates met. The state acquired more of the site in 1976 and 1996.

Located between Brenham and Navasota off State Highway 105, the site is now known as Washington-on-the-Brazos State Historic Site. It covers 293 acres (119 ha), and features three main attractions: Independence Hall, Barrington Living History Farm, and the Star of the Republic Museum, which is administered by Blinn College. The site's visitor center is free and includes interactive exhibits about the Texas Revolution and the park's attractions, a gift shop, a conference center and an education center.

== Barrington Living History Farm ==
The Barrington Living History Farm is a living museum homestead that represents the mid-19th-century farm founded by Dr. Anson Jones, the last President of the Republic of Texas. Costumed interpreters raise cotton, corn, cattle and hogs using period techniques. The 1844 Anson Jones Home was moved to the site in 1936 as part of the Texas Centennial Celebration. The reconstructed outbuildings include two slave cabins, a kitchen building, a smokehouse, a corn crib and a barn. The farmstead opened in 2000, and is operated by the Texas Historical Commission.
