= Grand Lodge of Texas =

Freemasonry lodge governing body in Texas, US

Grand Lodge of Texas A.F. & A.M.
- Seal of the Grand Lodge of Texas A.F. & A.M.
- Established: April 16, 1838
- Location: US
- Region served: Texas
- Website: grandlodgeoftexas.org

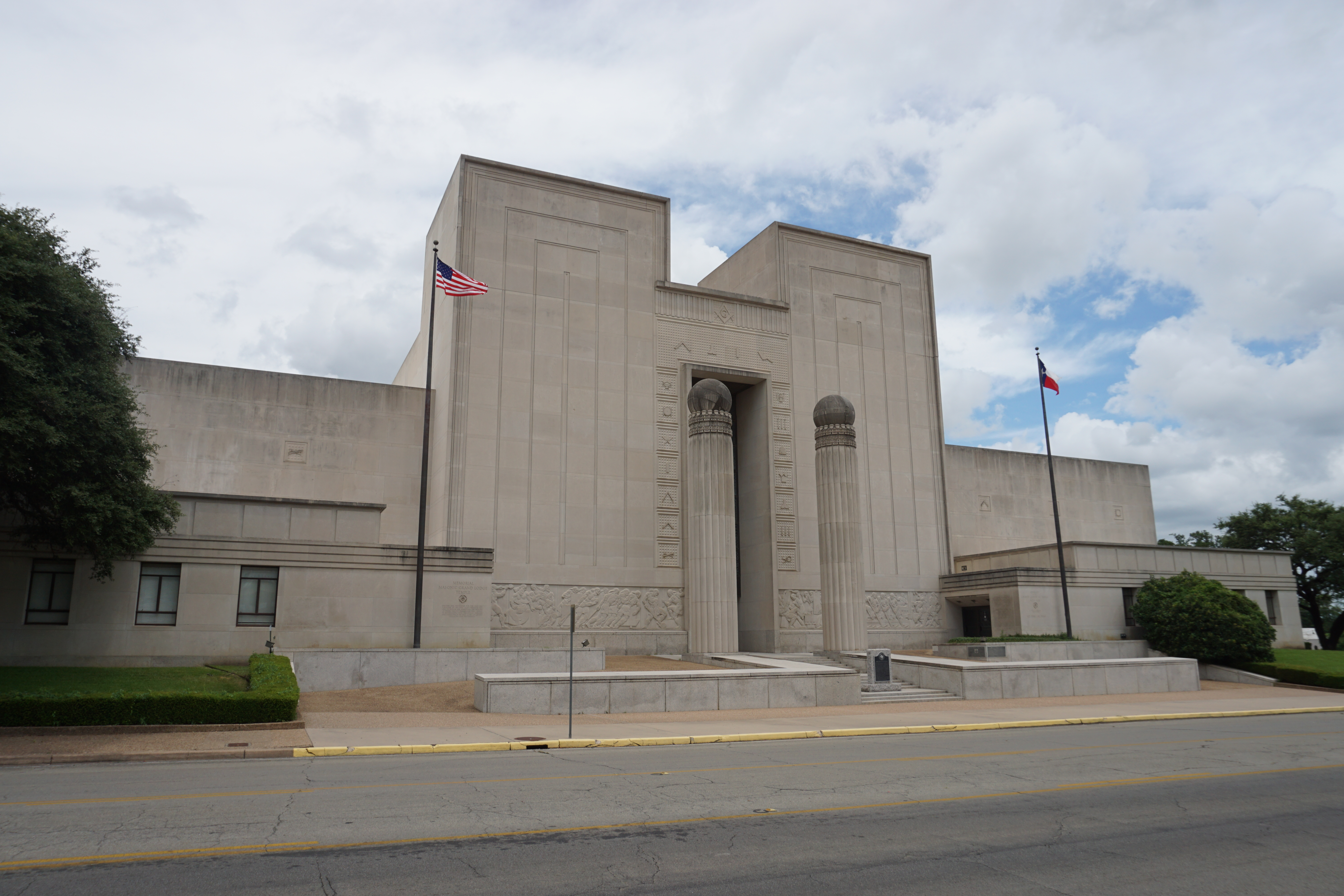
Grand Lodge of Texas centrally located in Waco

The Grand Lodge of Texas, Ancient Free and Accepted Masons is the largest of several governing bodies of Freemasonry in the State of Texas, being solely of the Ancients' tradition and descending from the Ancient Grand Lodge of England, founded on 17 June 1751 at the Turk's Head Tavern, Greek Street, Soho, London. According to historian James D. Carter, the "Grand Lodge of the Republic of Texas, A.F. & A.M." was founded on 16 April 1838. However, its first Grand Master and other grand officers were installed by Sam Houston on 11 May 1838. The Grand Lodge of Texas is one of the largest in the world, reporting 69,099 members in 2019. The current Grand Lodge of Texas facilities were made possible by the fundraising efforts of Waco Masonic Lodge No. 92.

== History ==
=== Early history of Freemasonry ===
Freemasonry has its historic origins among the early lodges of stonemasons and architects that, utilizing the style of Gothic architecture, built the cathedrals of Middle Ages. They were called "Freemasons" because they were free men and not serfs, their lodges were free from taxation, and they worked in freestone, a type of quarry stone. During the 17th century, lodges in Scotland began "accepting" members who were not operative stonemasons. The acceptance of these gentlemen Freemasons gave rise to the name "Free and Accepted Masons." In their ceremonies of passing from one degree to another they inculcated a system of morality, veiled in allegory and illustrated by the symbols and tools of their craft. During the 18th century, lodges formed grand lodges to govern the craft. No longer operative as of old, Masonic lodges continued without interruption to observe the customs and traditions of the fraternity for the "benefit of mankind."

=== Early masonry in Texas ===
On 11 February 1828, Stephen F. Austin called a meeting of Masons at San Felipe de Austin for the purpose of petitioning the York Grand Lodge of Mexico (Yorkinos) for a charter to form a lodge. Although the petition reached Matamoros, and was to be forwarded to Mexico City, nothing more was heard of it. By 1828 the ruling faction in Mexico City feared that the liberal elements in Texas might attempt to gain independence, and being aware of the political philosophies of English-speaking, Preston - Webb Freemasons, the Mexican government outlawed Freemasonry on 25 October of that year. The following year, Austin called another meeting of Masons who, in an attempt to alleviate the fears of the Mexican government, decided it was "impolitic and imprudent, at this time, to form Masonic lodges in Texas." In 1830, the Mexican government evicted US Minister to Mexico, and York Rite Mason, Joel Poinsett for introducing American liberalism into Mexico to counter the British influence through five York Rite charters from the Grand Lodge of New York, establishing Royal Arch Masonry in Mexico, and for being fundamental in establishing recognition of the York Rite Grand Lodge in Mexican Freemasonry, which fueled further internal turmoil inside Mexico, and set the stage for the Texas Revolution to occur.

In March 1835, five Master Masons by the names of Anson Jones, John Wharton, Asa Brigham, James Phelps, and Alexander Russell, met "in a little grove of peach or laurel" at the town of Brazoria, "near a place known as General John Austin's," and resolved to petition Grand Master John H. Holland of the Grand Lodge of Louisiana asking for a dispensation to form a lodge in Texas. Foremost among these five Masons was Anson Jones who would later serve as Grand Master, and as President of the Republic of Texas.

The lodge was instituted and opened on the 2nd floor of the old courthouse in Brazoria and their meetings continued until March 1836 when the Mexican army came through the town and destroyed the lodge building, their records, and jewels; however, the charter was not in Texas at the time. That charter, creating Holland Lodge No. 36, was issued and signed on 27 January 1836. It was given to a Mr. John M. Allen, originally of Louisiana Lodge No. 32 to carry to Texas. Allen had been recruiting volunteers for the Texas Army in New Orleans, and would not reach Texas until just before the Battle of San Jacinto on 21 April 1836. It would be carried inside the saddlebag of Anson Jones while he stormed into battle.

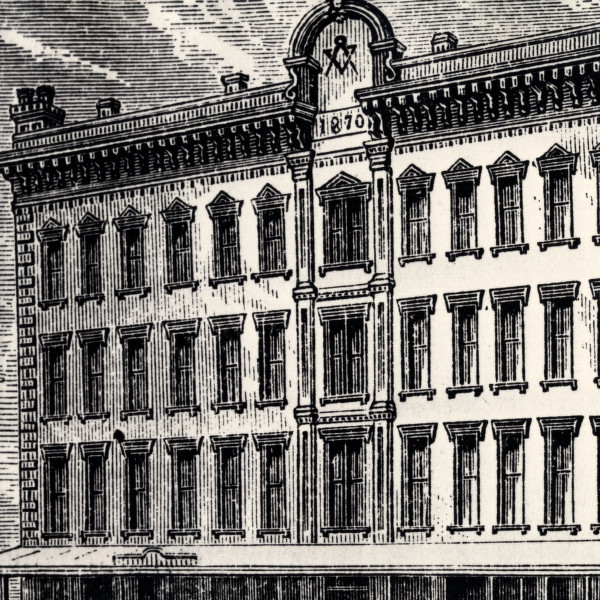
Houston Masonic Temple 1870

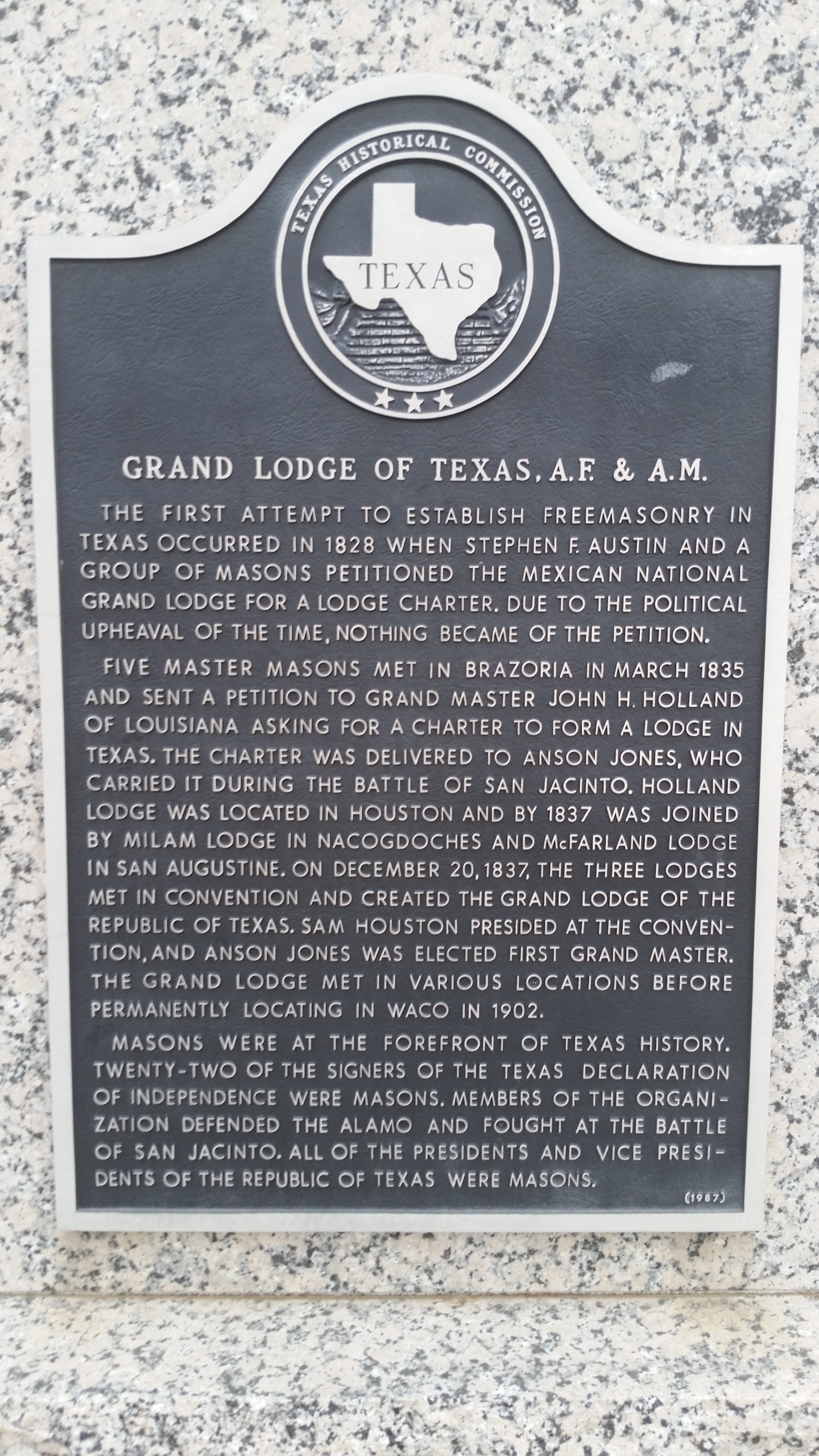
Texas historical marker in front of the Grand Lodge of Texas

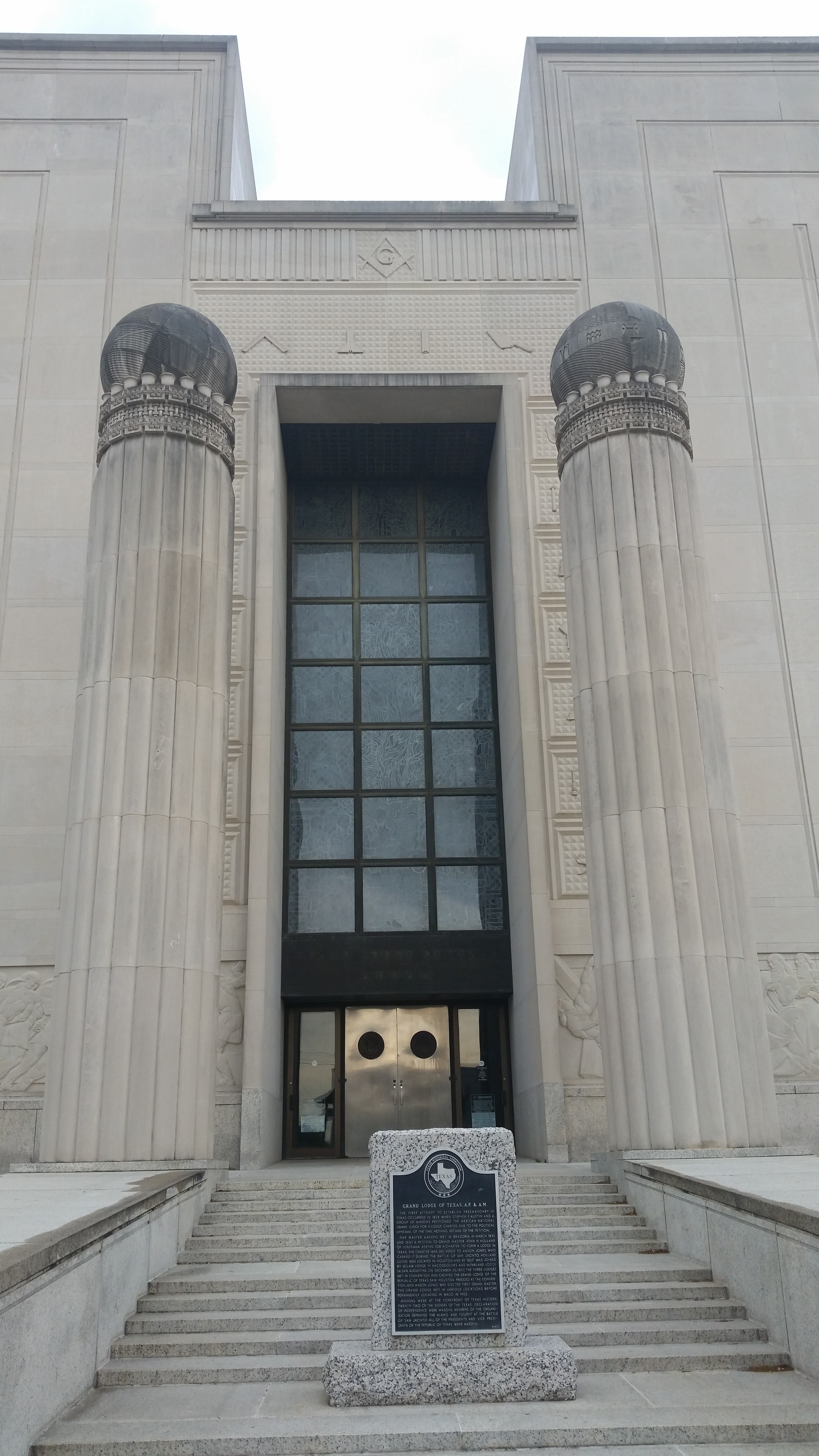
Front entrance to Grand Lodge of Texas

=== Freemasons and the Texas Revolution ===
Meanwhile, Texas was in the midst of war. The first shots of the Texas Revolution had been fired in October 1835 at Gonzales. Prior to this, Stephen F. Austin, the spokesman for Texas insurrectionists, had already met with 35 prominent local masons in a cottage at 829-833 Ursulines St. in New Orleans to plan the liberation from Mexico. At this meeting they strategized enlisting sympathizers and a local committee was authorized to recruit volunteers. Later on, delegates had gathered at the small town of Washington-on-the-Brazos and signed the Texas Declaration of Independence on 2 March 1836. The Mexican Army under General Antonio Lopez de Santa Anna had crossed the Rio Grande and attacked and defeated the small garrison at the Alamo in San Antonio de Bexar. Among the nearly 200 defenders who died at the Alamo were Freemasons James Bonham, James Bowie, David Crockett, Almaron Dickenson, and William Barrett Travis. Among the few survivors of the Alamo was Susanna Dickinson. During the siege Almaron gave his masonic apron to his wife and instructed her that when the Alamo is taken, to wrap it around herself and their child. She did and Mexican Col Juan Almonte, a known mason, recognized the apron of his fraternity and protected the widow and orphan from the brutality of after the siege. Santa Anna also offered take care of the widow and adopt the orphan by educating the child in Mexico, a courtesy he did not extend to any other widow or orphaned survivor. She refused and Santa Anna gifted the masonic widow and orphan each a blanket and two dollars in silver before sending them off with a letter of warning to General Houston.

There has existed for many years the story or myth that General Santa Anna, captured on 21 April 1836 after the defeat of the Mexican Army after the Battle of San Jacinto, was able to save himself from execution by giving secret "Masonic signs" when he was captured, and again when he was brought before General Sam Houston. Texas historian James D. Carter recorded in his book, Masonry in Texas, that "Texas Masons contemporary with [the Battle of] San Jacinto stated emphatically that Santa Anna 'filled the air' with Masonic signs after his capture and had given a Masonic grip to Houston." C.R. Wharton, in his book, El Presidente, stated that "Santa Anna, fearing for his life, gave the Masonic distress signal to John A. Wharton." Santa Anna probably knew the appropriate grips and signs, since he was a member of the Scottish Rite in Mexico (Escoceses), which had become dominated by men devoted to Mexican government centralization. Within Mexico, opposition to the centralists found itself organized around Mexico's York Rite establishment. By 1833, both had mostly been displaced in popularity by a "Mexican National Rite", although Santa Anna kept his Scottish Rite associates around him. However, he was also well known in Mexico as the "renegade mason" for his lack of integrity. Whether or not this specifically saved his life is not clear. What is certain is that Santa Anna was worth more to Texas alive than dead. President Andrew Jackson, a member of the same Masonic lodge as Sam Houston at Cumberland Lodge No. 8 in Nashville, Tennessee, wrote to Houston and implored him to spare Santa Anna's life, reminding Houston that "while he is in your power, the difficulties of your enemy, in raising another army, will be great.... Let not his blood be shed, unless imperious necessity demands it.... Both wisdom and humanity enjoin this course in relation to Santa Anna." After capture, Sam Houston assigned John Stiles among others to protect Santa Anna while in captivity, and in return Santa Anna gifted Stiles his masonic apron as a token of gratitude for providing hospitality and safety.

=== Grand Lodge of the Republic of Texas ===
The Masonic Convention of December 1837: By the end of 1837, three lodges had been chartered in Texas by the Grand Lodge of Louisiana: Holland Lodge No. 1 which had moved to the city of Houston, Milam Lodge No. 2 at Nacogdoches, and McFarland Lodge No. 3 at San Augustine. On 20 December 1837, Sam Houston, President of the Republic of Texas, presided over a convention meeting in the city of Houston consisting of the representatives of these three lodges. The representatives were: From Holland Lodge: Sam Houston, Anson Jones, Jeff Wright, and Thomas G. Western; from Milam Lodge: Thomas J. Rusk, I. W. Burton, Charles S. Taylor, Adolphus Sterne, and Kelsey Harris Douglass; and from McFarland Lodge: G. H. Winchell was delegated to represent McFarland Lodge. The representatives there assembled resolved to form a "Grand Lodge of the Republic of Texas," and to that end they elected Anson Jones as the first Grand Master of Masons in Texas, and other officers. After approving a resolution that the first meeting of the Grand Lodge should be held "on the third Monday of April next," the convention was then adjourned. It is clear from the minutes of this convention that, although a Grand Master was elected, he was not yet installed, and although a resolution to form a Grand Lodge was approved by the convention, it had not yet done so. The birthdate of the new Grand Lodge was still four months away.

The Grand Lodge is Born - 16 April 1838: As the delegates to the previous convention had agreed, they met again on the third Monday, the 16th of April 1838 in the city of Houston, although only three of the six elective grand officers were in attendance: the Grand Master-elect, the Senior Grand Warden-elect, and the Grand Treasurer-elect. Nevertheless, the minutes state that the "Grand Lodge was opened in ample form," and, according to Texas historian James D. Carter, "the jurisdiction of the Grand Lodge of Louisiana was ended," making 16 April 1838 the birthdate of the Grand Lodge of the Republic of Texas. It may be of some historical interest to note that three and one-half weeks later, on 11 May 1838, the Grand Lodge met again and installed the Grand Master and his officers. As a result, this latter date, 11 May 1838, is the birthdate of the Grand Lodge given in Coil's Masonic Encyclopedia.

=== Early Texas Lodges ===
The following is a list of 26 lodges that were organized before 19 February 1846, during the Republic of Texas period, and under the Grand Lodge of the Republic of Texas. They are listed along with their final charter dates and original locations:

Lodge	Final Charter Date	Location
Holland No. 1	2 Dec. 1835	Brazoria
Milam No. 2	2 Dec. 1838	Nacogdoches
McFarland No. 3^{[n1]}	18 Nov. 1838	San Augustine
Temple No. 4 ^{[n2]}	10 May 1838	Houston
St. John's No. 5	18 Nov. 1838	West Columbia
Harmony No. 6	30 Jan. 1840	Galveston
Matagorda No. 7	18 Nov. 1838	Matagorda
Phoenix No. 8^{[n1]}	18 Nov. 1838	Washington
DeKalb No. 9	2 Feb. 1840	De Kalb
Milam No. 11^{[n1]}	31 Jan. 1840	Independence
Austin No. 12	18 Feb. 1840	Austin
Constantine No. 13	10 Mar. 1840	Bonham
Trinity No. 14	2 Nov. 1840	Livingston
Friendship No. 16	11 Dec. 1841	Clarksville
Orphans Friend No. 17	30 Jun. 1842	Anderson
Washington No. 18^{[n2]}	11 Jan. 1844	Washington
Forrest No. 19	12 Jan. 1844	Huntsville
Graham No. 20	13 Jan. 1845	Brenham
Lothrop No. 21	18 Jan. 1845	Crockett
Marshall No. 22	18 Jan. 1845	Marshall
Clinton No. 23	16 Jan. 1845	Henderson
Redland No. 24^{[n3]}	16 Jan. 1845	San Augustine
Montgomery No. 25	15 Jan. 1846	Montgomery
Olive Branch No. 26^{[n5]}	19 Feb. 1846	Cincinnati
Paris No. 27	24 Jun. 1846	Paris
Frontier No. 28^{[n4]}	29 Nov. 1845	Corpus Christi

^[n1] - Demised.
^[n2] - Demised, but charter restored at or near original location.
^[n3] - Now working as Redland Lodge No. 3.
^[n4] - Demised 1847, but Charter Restored 2 Aug 2006 at West Columbia, TX.
^[n5] - Demised, but charter restored Dec 2005 near Sealy, TX.

=== Famous Texas Freemasons ===
- Stephen F. Austin - Father of Texas - Louisiana Lodge No. 109, Ste. Genevieve, Mo.
- Sam Houston - Hero of San Jacinto, 1st and 3rd President of the Republic of Texas - Holland Lodge No. 1, Houston, Tx. and Cumberland Lodge No. 8, Nashville, Tn.
- William Barret Travis - The Defender of the Alamo - Alabama Lodge No. 3
- James Bowie - The Greatest Fighter in the Southwest - Loge L'Humble Chaumiere No. 19, Opelousas, La.
- David Crockett - King of the Wilderness - (lodge unknown - his Masonic apron, entrusted to the Sheriff of Weakley Co., Tn., has survived with the family of E. M. Taylor of Paducah, Ky.)
- James Bonham - Alamo Defender and last messenger to leave the Alamo and return - (So. Carolina lodge records destroyed by fire in 1838)
- James Fannin - Commander at Goliad - Holland Lodge No. 36, Brazoria, Tx.
- Anson Jones - Last President of the Republic of Texas - Holland Lodge No. 1, Houston, Tx. Harmony Lodge No. 52, Phila. Pa.
- Lorenzo de Zavala - Interim Vice-President of the Republic of Texas - Logia Independencia No. 454 (Gr. Ldg. of New York), Mexico City.
- Jose Navarro - Texas Patriot and Legislator - American Virtue Lodge No. 10, Saltillo, Mexico.
- Juan Seguin - Tejano Patriot - Holland Lodge No. 1, Houston, Tx.
- Lawrence S. "Sul" Ross - Texas Ranger, Confederate General, Governor of Texas, President of Texas A&M - Waco Lodge No. 92, Waco.
- John J. Kennedy - "Sheriff, leader of law and order faction of the Regulator-Moderator War, Confederate Captain" - Marshall Lodge No. 22, Marshall, Tx.
- R.E.B. Baylor - Founder of Baylor University - Baylor Lodge No. 125, Gay Hill, Tx.
- William Marsh Rice - Founder of Rice University - Holland Lodge No. 1, Houston, TX
- Peter W Grey - Partner at Grey, Botts, and Baker (Predecessor of International Energy Law Firm Baker Botts LLP) - Holland Lodge No. 1, Houston TX
- Benjamin F. Terry - Founder and Commander of Terry's Texas Rangers - Holland Lodge No. 1, Houston.
- Thomas S. Lubbock - Commander of Terry's Texas Rangers - Holland Lodge No. 1, Houston.
- Charles Goodnight - Plainsman and Cattleman - Phoenix Lodge No. 275, Weatherford, Tx.
- Jimmie Rodgers - The Singin' Brakeman, Father of Country Music - Blue Bonnet Lodge No. 1219, San Antonio, Tx.
- Audie Murphy - Most Decorated American Soldier of World War II - No. Hollywood Lodge No. 542
- Gene Autry - The Singing Cowboy - Charity Lodge No. 565, Lipan, Tx.
- Claire Chennault - Founder of the Flying Tigers - League City Lodge No. 1053, League City, Tx.
- Edwin E. "Buzz" Aldrin - 2nd Man on the Moon - Clear Lake Lodge No. 1417, El Lago, Tx
- Ross Sterling - 31st Governor of Texas, Founder of Humble Oil Company (Predecessor of ExxonMobil) - Holland Lodge No. 1 Houston, TX
- James "Red" Duke - Chief of Trauma Center at Memorial Hermann Hospital, Houston, and the Creator of the Life Flight Helicopter System, the first air ambulance service in Texas. Hillsboro Lodge No. 196, Hillsboro, Tx.
- Hiram Abiff Boaz - Second President of Southern Methodist University - Hillcrest Masonic Lodge in Dallas Texas
- Stoney LaRue - Red Dirt Country Musician, Singer, Songwriter. Tannehill Lodge No. 52, Dallas, Tx.
- Brandon Dean Jenkins - Red Dirt Country Musician, Singer, Songwriter. Hill City Lodge No 456, Austin, Tx.

=== Freemason Presidents of The Republic of Texas ===
- David G. Burnet 1836, Holland Lodge No. 1, Houston, TX
- Sam Houston 1836-1838, Holland Lodge No. 1, Houston, TX
- Mirabeau B. Lamar 1838-1841, Harmony Lodge No. 6, Galveston, TX
- Sam Houston 1841-1844, Holland Lodge No. 1, Houston, TX
- Anson Jones 1844-1846, Holland Lodge No. 1, Houston, TX, Grand Master 1838

=== Freemason Vice Presidents of The Republic of Texas ===
- Lorenzo DeZavala 1836, Logia Independencia No. 454, Mexico City, Mexico
- Mirabeau B. Lamar 1836-1838, Harmony Lodge No. 6, Galveston, TX
- David G. Burnet 1838-1841, Holland Lodge No. 1, Houston, TX
- Edward Burleson 1841-1844, McFarland Lodge No. 3, San Augustine, TX
- Kenneth Anderson 1844-1843, McFarland Lodge No. 3, San Augustine, TX

=== Freemason Governors of Texas ===
- James Pinchney Henderson 1844-1846, McFarland Lodge No. 3, San Augustine Texas
- George Wood 1847-1849, Forest Lodge 19, Huntsville Texas
- James W. Henderson 1853, Holland Lodge 1, Houston Texas
- Elisha Pease 1853-1857, St Johns Lodge 5, West Columbia Texas
- Hardin Runnels 1857-1859, Austin Lodge 12, Austin Texas
- Samuel Houston 1859-1861, Cumberland Lodge 8. Nashville Tennessee
- Edward Clark 1861, Austin Lodge 12, Austin Texas
- Francis Lubbock 1861-1863, Holland Lodge 1, Houston Texas
- Andrew Hamilton 1865-1866, Palestine Lodge 12, Palestine Texas
- James Throckmorton 1866-1867, St Johns Lodge 51, McKinney Texas
- Edmund Davis 1870-1874, Rio Grande Lodge 81, Brownsville Texas
- Richard Coke 1874-1876, Waco Lodge 92, Waco Texas
- Richard Hubbard 1876-1879, St Johns 53, Tyler Texas
- Oran Roberts 1879-1883, Redland Lodge 3, San Augustine Texas
- John Ireland 1883-1887, Guadalupe Lodge 109, Seguin Texas
- Lawrence Sullivan Ross 1887-1891, Waco Lodge 92, Waco Texas
- Charles Culberson 1886-1899, Jefferson Lodge 38, Jefferson Texas
- Joseph Sayers 1899-1903, Gamble Lodge 244, Bastrop Texas, Grand Master 1875
- S.W.T Lanham 1903-1907, Phoenix Lodge 275, Weatherford Texas
- William Hobby 1917-1921, Beaumont Lodge 286, Beaumont Texas
- Pat Neff 1921-1925, Baylor Lodge 1235, Waco Texas, Grand Master 1945
- Dan Moody 1927-1931, Solomon Lodge 484, Taylor Texas
- Ross Sterling 1931-1933, Holland Lodge 1, Houston Texas
- James Allred 1935-1938, Bowie Lodge 578, Bowie Texas
- W. Lee ODaniel 1939-1949, Ninnescah Lodge 230, Kingman Kansas
- Coke Stevenson 1941-1947, Junction Lodge 548, Junction Texas
- Beauford Jester 1947-1949, Corsicana Lodge 174, Corsicana Texas
- Allan Shivers 1949-1957, Magnolia Lodge 495, Woodville Texas; Hill City Lodge 456, Austin Texas
- Price Daniels 1957-1963, Liberty Lodge 48, Liberty Texas
- Preston Smith 1969-1973, Yellowhouse Lodge 841, Lubbock Texas
- Dolph Briscoe 1973-1979, Uvalde Lodge 472, Uvalde Texas
- Mark White 1983-1987, Park Place Lodge 1172, Houston Texas; University Lodge 1190, Austin Texas

=== Freemason LT Governors of Texas (incomplete list) ===
- Albert C. Horton 1846-1847, Matagorda Lodge No. 7, Matagorda, TX
- John Alexander Greer 1847-1851, Redland Lodge No. 3, San Augustine, Texas, Grand Master 1842
- James W. Henderson 1851-1853, Holland Lodge 1, Houston Texas
- David Catchings Dickson 1853-1855, Quitman Lodge No. 18, Georgetown, MS
- Hardin Runnels 1855-1857, Austin Lodge 12, Austin Texas
- Francis Lubbock 1857-1859, Holland Lodge 1, Houston Texas
- Edward Clark 1859-1861, Austin Lodge 12, Austin Texas
- John McClannahan Crockett, 1861-1863, Tannehil Lodge No. 52, Dallas, TX
- Richard Hubbard 1874-1876, St Johns 53, Tyler Texas
- Joseph Sayers 1879-1981, Gamble Lodge 244, Bastrop Texas, Grand Master 1875
- Francis Marion Martin 1883-1885, Unknown Masonic Lodge
- Thomas Benton Wheeler 1887-1891, Austin Lodge No. 12, Austin, TX
- James Browning 1899-1903 Unknown Masonic Lodge
- William Hobby 1915-1917, Beaumont Lodge 286, Beaumont Texas
- Barry Miller 1925-1931, (unknown Masonic Lodge) Dallas, TX
- Coke Stevenson 1939-1941, Junction Lodge 548, Junction Texas
- Allan Shivers 1947-1949, Magnolia Lodge 495, Woodville Texas; Hill City Lodge 456, Austin Texas
- Preston Smith 1963-1969, Yellowhouse Lodge 841, Lubbock Texas
- Bob Bullock 1991-1999, Hillsboro Lodge No. 196, Hillsboro, TX; University Lodge No. 1190, Austin, TX

== See also ==
- Masonic Home Independent School District
- Alamo Lodge No. 44
