= Anson Jones =

President of the Republic of Texas from 1844 to 1846

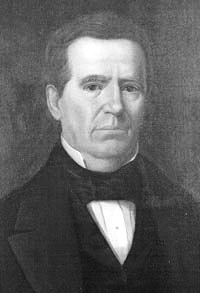

4th President of the Republic of Texas
- In office December 9, 1844 – February 19, 1846
- Vice President: Kenneth L. Anderson (1844–1845); None (1845–1846)
- Preceded by: Sam Houston
- Succeeded by: J. Pinckney Henderson (as governor of Texas)

Personal details
- Born: January 20, 1798 Great Barrington, Massachusetts, U.S.
- Died: January 9, 1858 (aged 59) Houston, Texas, U.S.
- Cause of death: Suicide by gunshot
- Profession: Physician

Anson Jones (January 20, 1798 – January 9, 1858) was an American medical doctor, businessman, and politician, who was the fourth and last president of the Republic of Texas.

== Early life ==
Jones was born on January 20, 1798, in Great Barrington, Massachusetts. He traveled to Seneca Falls, New York, and opened a one-room school. He taught there from 1812 to 1813. In 1820, Jones was licensed as a doctor by the Oneida, New York, Medical Society, and began medical practice in 1822. However, his practice did not prosper, and he moved several more times before finally being arrested in Philadelphia by a creditor. He stayed in Philadelphia for a few more years, teaching and practicing medicine, until in 1823, he decided to go to Venezuela.

Later, Jones returned to Philadelphia, earned an MD, and reopened his practice. He never had much success as a doctor, and in 1832, he renounced medicine and headed for New Orleans, where he entered the mercantile trade. Once again, though, Jones's dreams were thwarted. Though he safely weathered two plagues, his business efforts never met with any success, and within a year he had no money.

He was a member and Past Master of the Masonic Harmony Lodge No. 52 of Philadelphia. He was a Past Grand of Independent Order of Odd Fellows Washington Lodge no. 2 and Philadelphia Lodge no. 13 in Pennsylvania and the Past Grand Master of the Grand Lodge of Pennsylvania of Oddfellows.

=== Life in Texas ===
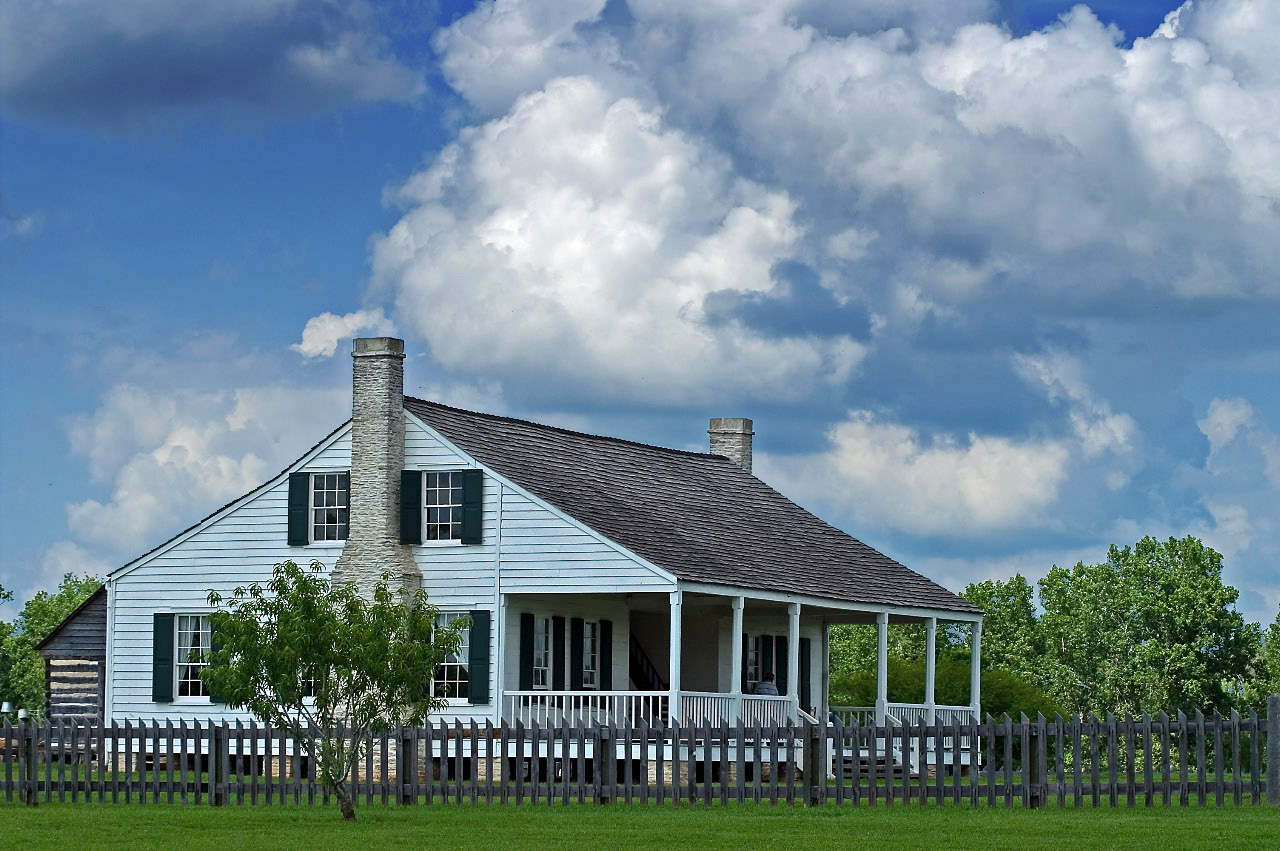
Anson Jones House, now in Washington-on-the-Brazos, Texas

In 1832, Jones headed west to Texas, settling eventually in Brazoria. Here, at last, he met with success, establishing a medical practice that prospered quickly. In 1835, he began to speak out about the growing tensions between Texas and Mexico, and that year he attended the Consultation, a meeting held at Columbia, by Texas patriots to discuss the fight with Mexico (the meeting's leadership did not want to call the meeting a "convention", for fear the Mexican government would view it as an independence forum). Jones himself presented a resolution at the Consultation calling for a convention to be held to declare independence, but he himself refused to be nominated to the convention.

During the Texas Revolution, Jones served as a judge advocate and surgeon to the Texas Army, though he insisted on holding the rank of private throughout the conflict. After the war, Jones returned to Brazoria and resumed his medical practice.

Upon his return to Brazoria, Jones found that James Collinsworth, a fellow Texas patriot and signer of the Texas Declaration of Independence from Brazoria, had set up a law practice in Jones's office. Jones evicted Collinsworth and challenged him to a duel (though the duel never occurred).

Prior to the revolution, on March 2, 1834, Jones met with four other Masons at Brazoria and petitioned the Grand Master of Louisiana for a dispensation and a charter to form the first Masonic lodge in Texas. In December, when the lodge was set to labor, Jones was elected its first Master. The charter for Holland Lodge No. 36 arrived during the final days of the revolution, and Jones carried it in his saddlebags during the decisive Battle of San Jacinto on April 21, 1836. At the formation of the Grand Lodge of the Republic of Texas in December 1837, he was elected its first Grand Master. He also became the first Grand Master of the Independent Order of Odd Fellows in Texas.

On May 17, 1840, he married Mary Smith Jones. Together, they had four children.

=== Move to politics ===
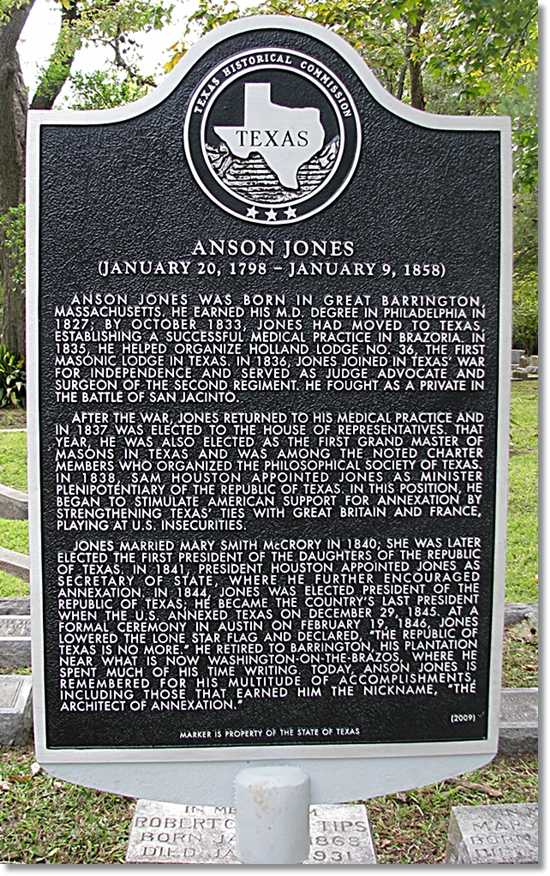
Texas Historical Commission marker located in Glenwood Cemetery (Houston, Texas) commemorating the many important contributions made by Anson Jones to the history of Texas

Jones and Collinsworth would spar again. Collinsworth was instrumental in starting the Texas Railroad, Navigation, and Banking Company, to which Jones was vehemently opposed. Jones was elected to the Second Texas Congress as an opponent of the company; however, his most significant act in Congress was to call for the withdrawal of the Texas proposal for annexation by the United States. He also helped draw up legislation to regulate medical practice, and called for the establishment of an endowment for a university.

Jones expected to return to his practice at Brazoria after his term in Congress, but Texas President Sam Houston instead appointed him Minister to the United States, where Jones was to formally withdraw the annexation proposal.

During this time, while many Texans hoped to encourage eventual annexation by the United States, some supported waiting for annexation or even remaining independent. The United States, in the late 1830s, was hesitant to annex Texas for fear of provoking a war with Mexico. Jones and others felt that Texas gaining recognition from European states was important, and began to set up trade relations with them, to make annexation of Texas more attractive to the United States, or failing that, to give Texas the strength to remain independent.

Jones was recalled to Texas by new president Mirabeau Lamar in 1839. Back at home, he found himself elected to a partial term in the Senate, where he quickly became a critic of Lamar's administration. He retired from the Senate in 1841, declining the opportunity to serve as Vice President in favor of returning to his medical practice. Late in 1841, though, he was named Texas Secretary of State by President Houston, who had recently been elected president again by opponents of Lamar.

Jones served as Secretary of State until 1844. During his term, the main goal of Texas foreign policy was to get either an offer of annexation from the United States, or a recognition of Texas independence from Mexico, or preferably, both at the same time.

Anson Jones served as the fourth and last President of the Republic of Texas. During his presidency, he played a decisive role in overseeing the final negotiations that led to the annexation of Texas by the United States. Jones sought to balance offers of recognition from Mexico with the annexation proposal from the U.S., believing that maintaining both options would strengthen Texas’s diplomatic position. On February 19, 1846, Jones officially marked the end of the Republic and its admission to the Union by personally lowering the Republic of Texas flag and watching as the United States Stars and Stripes was raised for the first time on Texas soil. He proclaimed, “The final act in this great drama is now performed. The Republic of Texas is no more.” After leaving office, Jones retired to his plantation near Washington-on-the-Brazos and largely withdrew from public life.

== After presidency ==
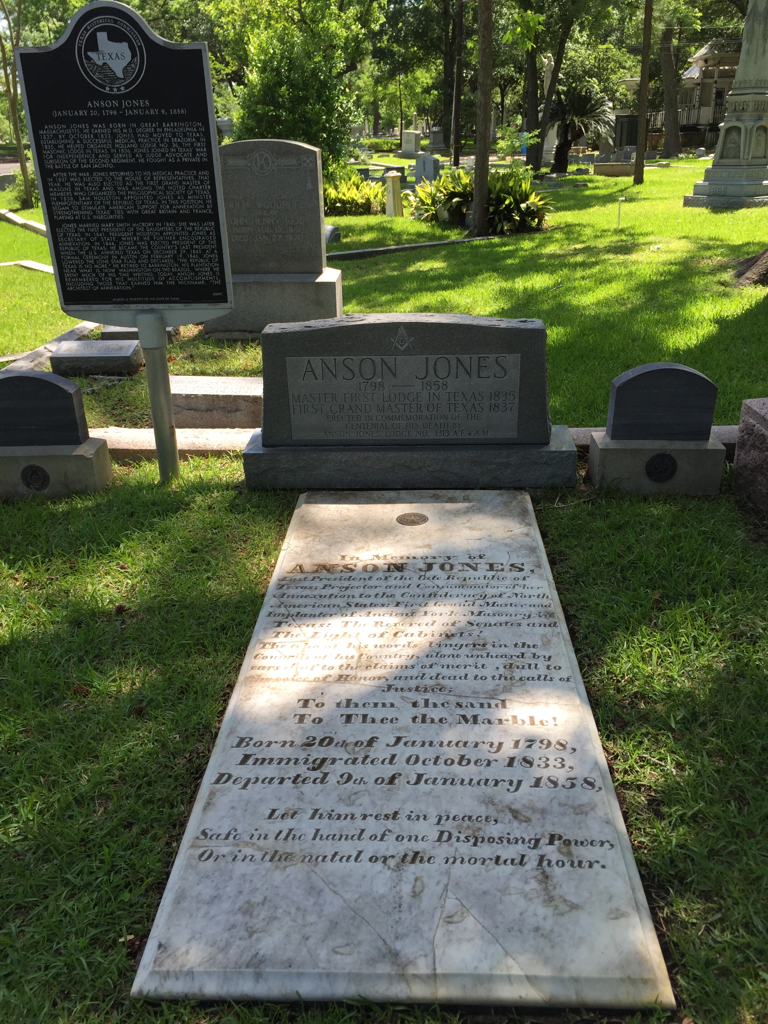
Anson Jones' gravesite at Glenwood Cemetery in Houston

Jones hoped that the new Texas state legislature would send him to the United States Senate. He was not chosen, and as time went on, he became increasingly bitter about this slight. Although Jones prospered as a planter and eventually amassed an enormous estate, he was never able to get past the fact that Sam Houston and Thomas Jefferson Rusk were chosen over him to represent Texas in Washington, DC.

In 1849 Jones was thrown from a horse. His left arm was crushed and became withered and discolored. This injury sent him back east for medical treatment. In the east he was exposed to and found keen interest in new technology, especially railroads.

After the suicide of Thomas Jefferson Rusk in July 1857, Jones became convinced that the legislature would finally send him to the Senate, but he received no votes and former Governor J. Pinkney Henderson was appointed to fill the vacancy.

=== Death ===
For four days in January 1858, Jones had lodged at Houston's old Capitol Hotel, the former seat of government of the Republic of Texas. His arm permanently injured in the fall, and having received no votes for a vacant seat in the U.S. Senate, he brooded over his career. After dinner on January 9, 1858, he returned to his room and fatally shot himself. He was 59 years old. Jones was buried at Glenwood Cemetery in Houston.

== Legacy ==
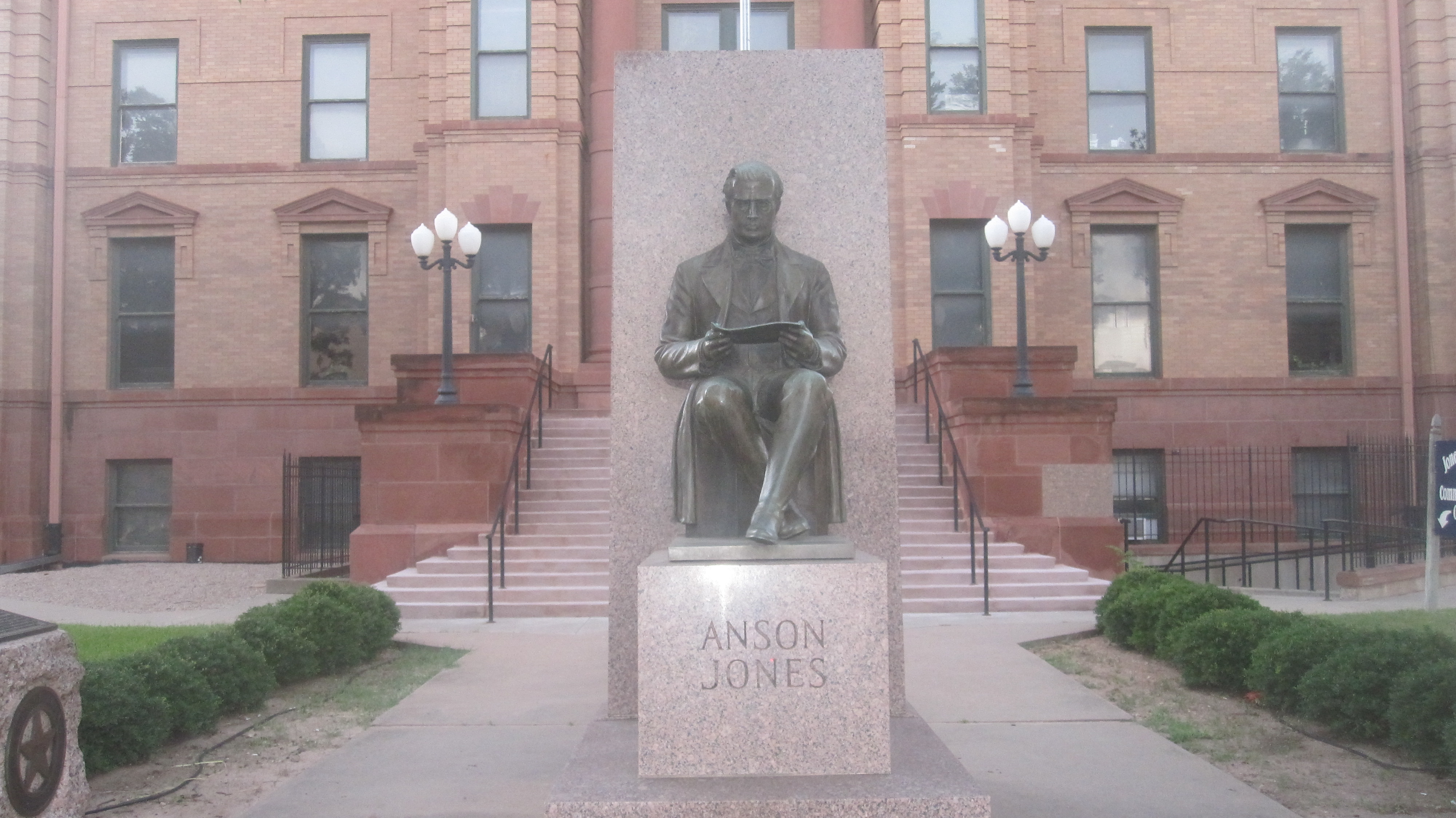
Statue of Anson Jones at Jones County Courthouse in Anson, Texas.

Jones County, Texas, and its county seat, Anson, were both named for Anson Jones. The Anson Jones Elementary Schools in Bryan and Midland are named for him along with Anson Jones Middle School in San Antonio, as well as Anson Jones Elementary in the Dallas ISD system. His plantation home, known as Barrington, is preserved at Washington-on-the-Brazos State Historic Park.

Political offices
Preceded by Sam Houston (second term)	President of the Republic of Texas; 1844–1846	Succeeded by Office abolished
