= ExxonMobil Building =

Skyscraper in Houston, Texas

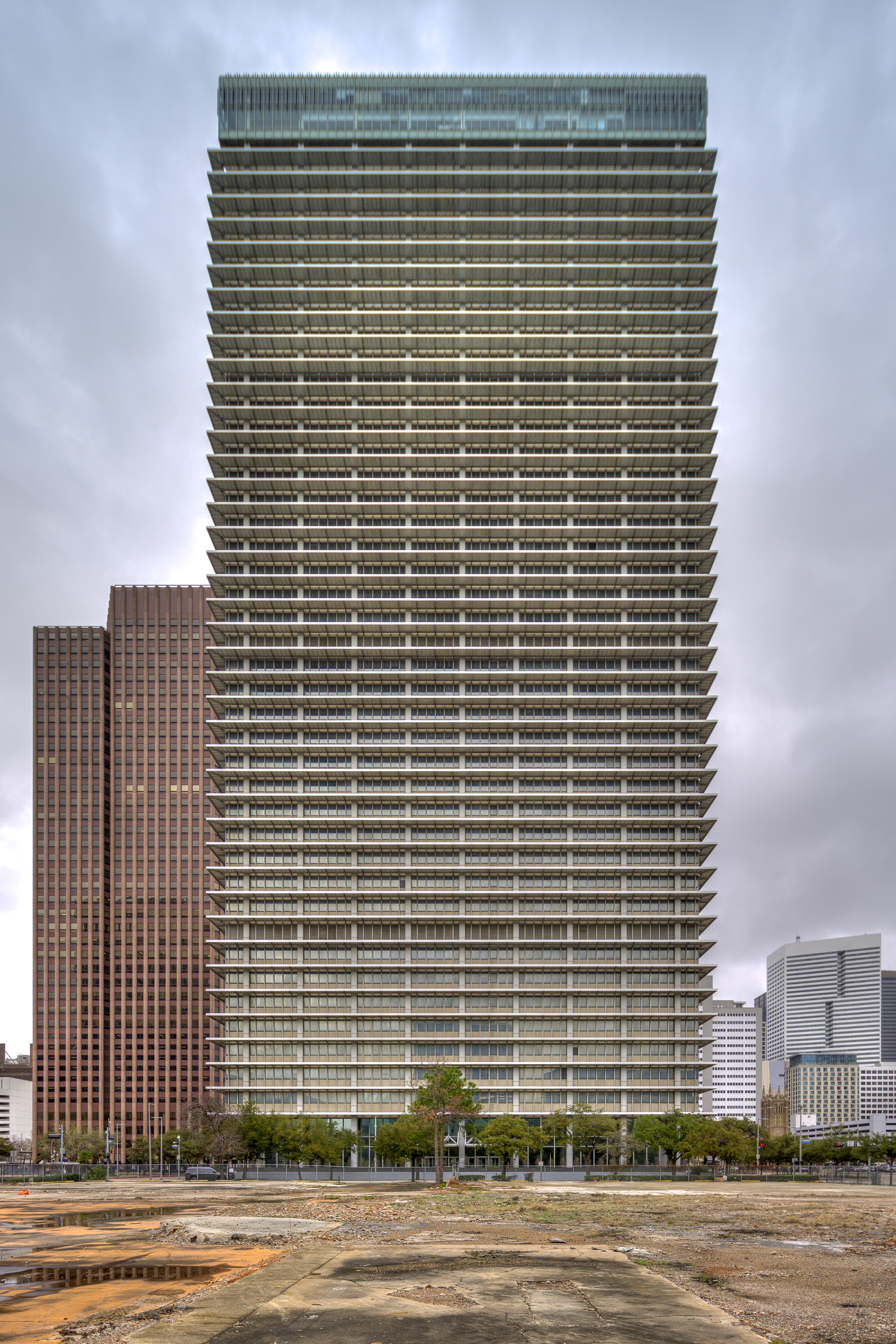
- Interactive map of the ExxonMobil Building area
- Former names: Humble Building; Humble Oil Building
- Alternative names: Exxon Tower

General information
- Status: Completed
- Type: Commercial offices
- Location: 800 Bell Street; Houston, Texas
- Coordinates: 29.7535°N 95.3694°W
- Completed: 1963

Height
- Roof: 184.71 m (606.0 ft)

Technical details
- Floor count: 44
- Floor area: 1,200,000 sq ft (110,000 m^{2})

Design and construction
- Architects: Welton Becket and Associates; George Pierce-Abel B. Pierce; Golemon & Rolfe Associates
- Developer: Del E. Webb Construction Company
- Structural engineer: McClelland Engineers
- Main contractor: W. S. Bellows Construction

The ExxonMobil Building (also known as Exxon Tower, and formerly as Humble Oil Building) at 800 Bell Street in Houston, Texas is a 45-story, 1,200,000 sq ft (110,000 m^{2}) skyscraper built in 1963, designed by Welton Becket & Associates. The building is known for its “fins” which protrude from the building’s exterior to provide shade from the sun.

At the time of its construction, it was the tallest building west of the Mississippi River at 606 ft (185 m), surpassing the Republic Bank Tower in Dallas (the previous record holder). It remained the tallest building west of the Mississippi only until 1965, when Elm Place was built in Dallas. It was listed on the National Register of Historic Places in 2025.

== History ==
800 Bell Street was built in 1963 as the headquarters of Humble Oil Company, a predecessor of Exxon. In 1973 Humble's parent company Standard Oil of New Jersey rebranded nationwide as Exxon and discontinued the Humble name.

During the Houston Astros' 2004 NLCS run (playoffs), the top of the building was crowned by hundreds of tiny blue lights while an enormous Astros star (logo) made of white lights was hung on the south side of the building.

In 2011 the company announced they would relocate all employees in the building to a new ExxonMobil office in Spring.

In January 2013, Shorenstein Properties acquired the property for $50 million. As part of the deal, ExxonMobil leased back the entire building through 2015. Shorenstein Properties announced plans to undertake significant improvements following ExxonMobil's departure.

In 2015, as ExxonMobil's lease expired, oil prices crashed. This caused petroleum companies to shed excess office space, leaving the property vacant for almost the next decade.

Mayor of Houston Annise Parker proposed moving municipal court and Houston Police Department operations into the ExxonMobil building. Charles McClelland, the head of HPD, stated that having so many law enforcement and public safety agencies concentrated in a single building may be a safety risk, citing the 1995 Oklahoma City bombing. In September 2015 Parker's administration announced that the plan would not move forward due to concerns over costs.

In late 2022, the 1.2 million square foot building was sold to developers with plans to convert the vacant office building to residential units.

=== Location ===
The building is two blocks east of 1500 Louisiana Street; a parking lot is between the two buildings. The building is situated about five blocks north of the Pierce Elevated freeway, which is slated to be re-routed and removed as part of a Texas Department of Transportation Plan.

== Petroleum Club ==
The Petroleum Club of Houston moved into the top three floors of the ExxonMobil Building in February 1963. The club was accessible through elevators on Bell Street. In January 2015, due to ExxonMobil's lease expiration, the club relocated to Total Plaza.
