= Petroleum Club of Houston =

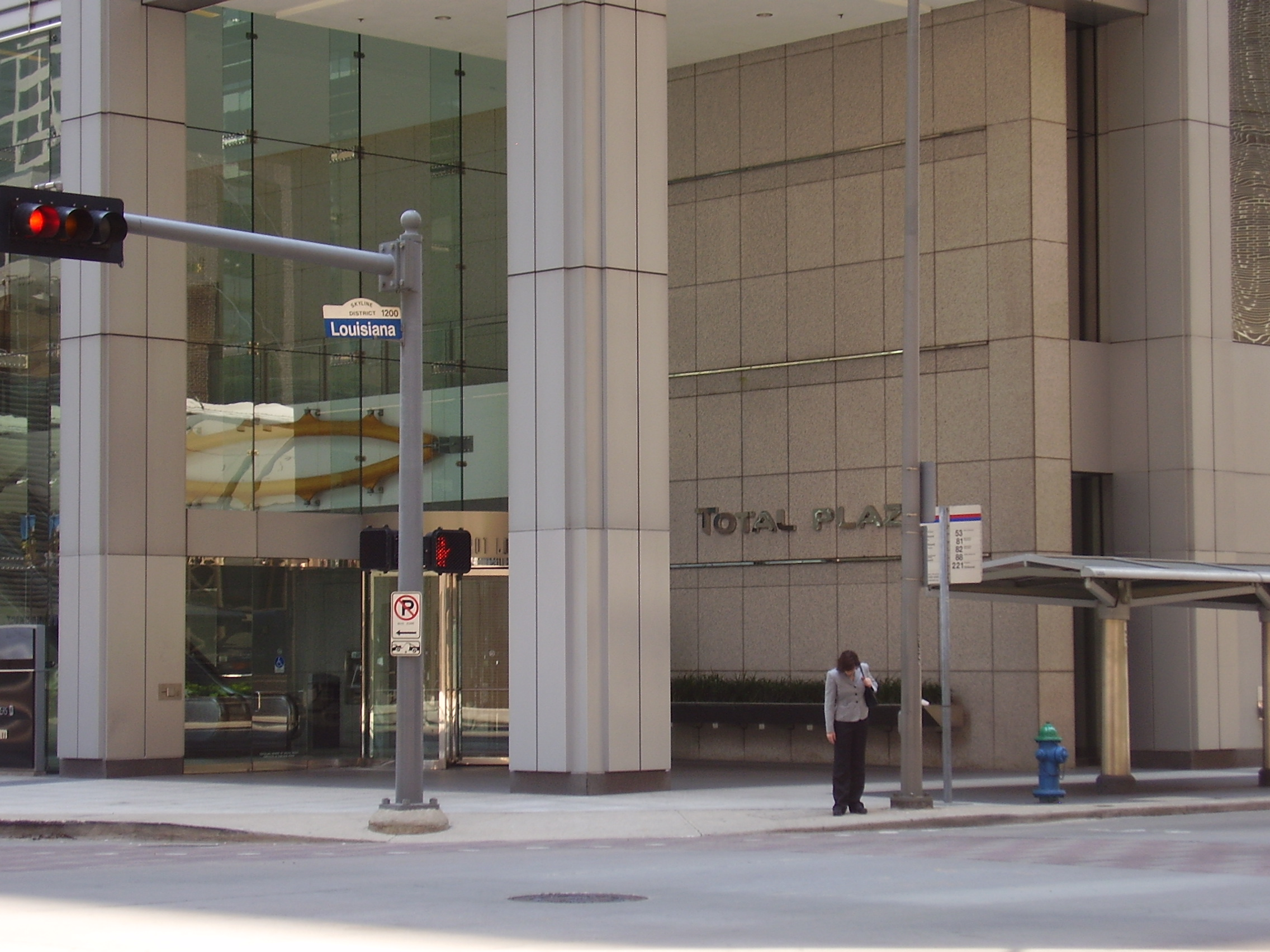
Total Plaza, the current location of the Petroleum Club

The Petroleum Club of Houston (PCOH) is a private social club located on the 35th floor in the Total Plaza in Downtown Houston. As of November 2014 the club had 1,200 members.

It operates under laws for 501(c)(7) Social and Recreation Clubs. In 2022 it claimed $3,719,012 in total revenue and $5,088,041 in total assets.

== History ==
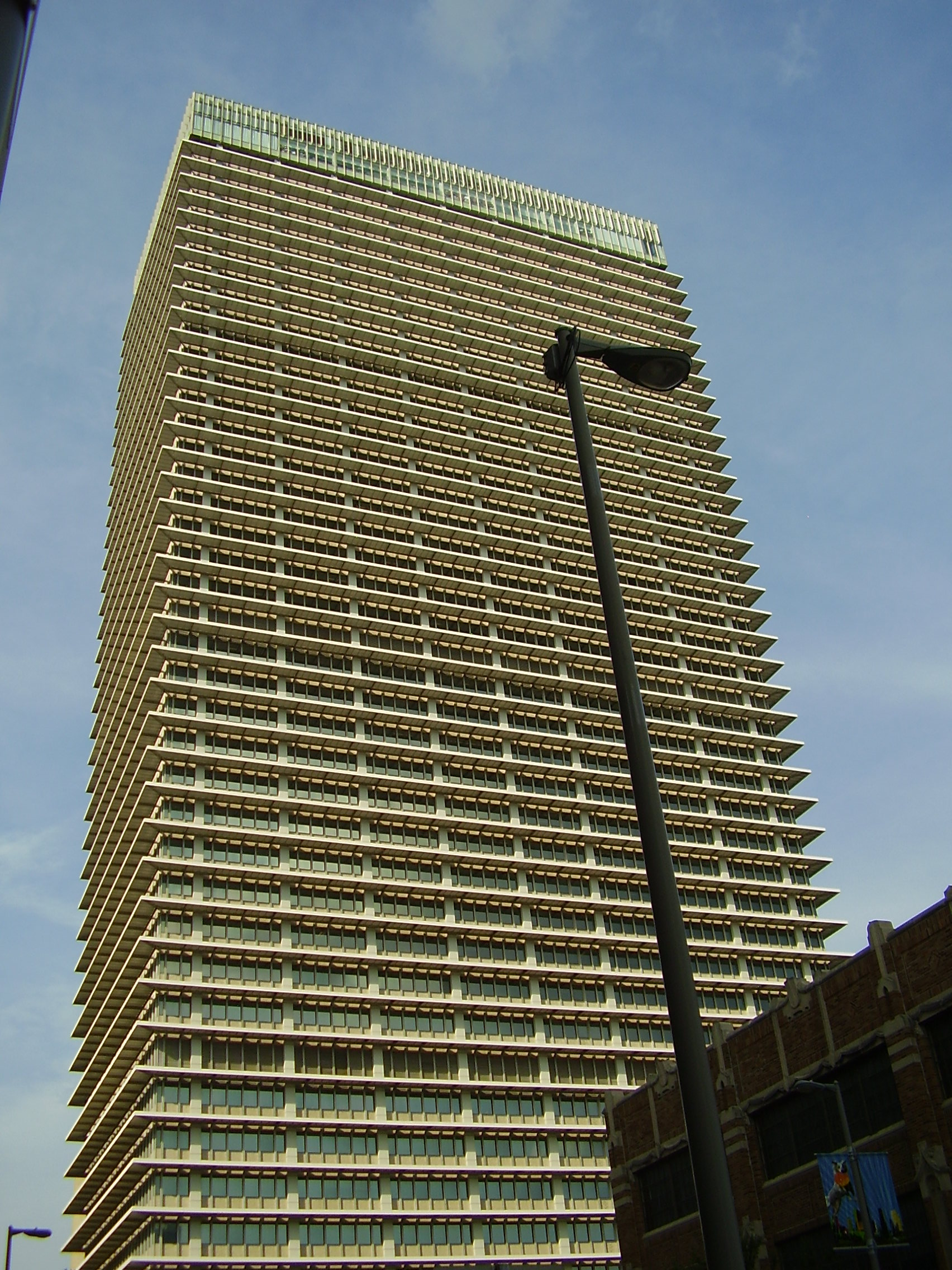
From 1963 to 2015 the club was located at the ExxonMobil Building

The club was founded in 1946. Several oil businesspersons who met at the Rice Hotel had established the club. It was originally housed on the top area of the Rice Hotel but it moved to the ExxonMobil Building in 1963 after an increase of membership. Previously the club occupied the top two floors of that building, numbers 43 and 44. The club was accessible through elevators on Bell Street. Because of the sale and scheduled renovation of the ExxonMobil Building, the club was forced to find a new location. The club's ExxonMobil space was scheduled to close after January 10, 2015, and its new quarters in the Total Plaza were scheduled to open two weeks later.

== Facilities ==
The club space at the Total Plaza has an energy industry theme employing gold, bronze, and metallic colors. The new club has a bar with the view of the skyline of Houston. Kirksey, an architecture company based in Houston, designed the club space. Nancy Sarnoff of the Houston Chronicle wrote that the space has a "more modern look" compared to the previous space at the ExxonMobil Building.

== Events ==
Events hosted by the club include the Young Professionals Organization birthday party, as well as bar mitzvahs, birthday parties, wedding receptions, other social events, and business events.
