= Robert Wilson (Texas politician) =

Texas politician and entrepreneur

Robert "Honest Bob" Wilson (1793 – 1856) was a land speculator and politician in Texas.

== Early life ==
Robert Wilson was born in Talbot County, Maryland, on December 7, 1792, to James and Elizabeth (Hardcastle) Wilson. Robert Wilson received some schooling and learned a variety of skills in Baltimore, including carpentry, machining, and running boilers. He joined the military service of the United States during the War of 1812.

== Career and personal life ==
Wilson fought in the Battle of 1812.

In 1819, Wilson married Margaret Prendergrast, after which they moved to St. Louis.

Robert Wilson ran for the presidency of the Republic of Texas in 1838. Initially he was engaged in a four-way race with Vice-President Mirabeau Lamar, Peter Grayson, and James Collinsworth, but Grayson committed suicide on July 9, 1838, and Collingsworth drowned in Galveston Bay two days later. Lamar won the race by a landslide, 6,987 votes to 252 for Wilson.

== Death and legacy ==
Wilson died on May 25, 1858, and he is interred at Glenwood Cemetery in Houston.

Wilson's son, James Theodore Wilson, was a two-term mayor of Houston.
