= Maude B. Perkins =

American teacher and temperance reformer (1874–1932)

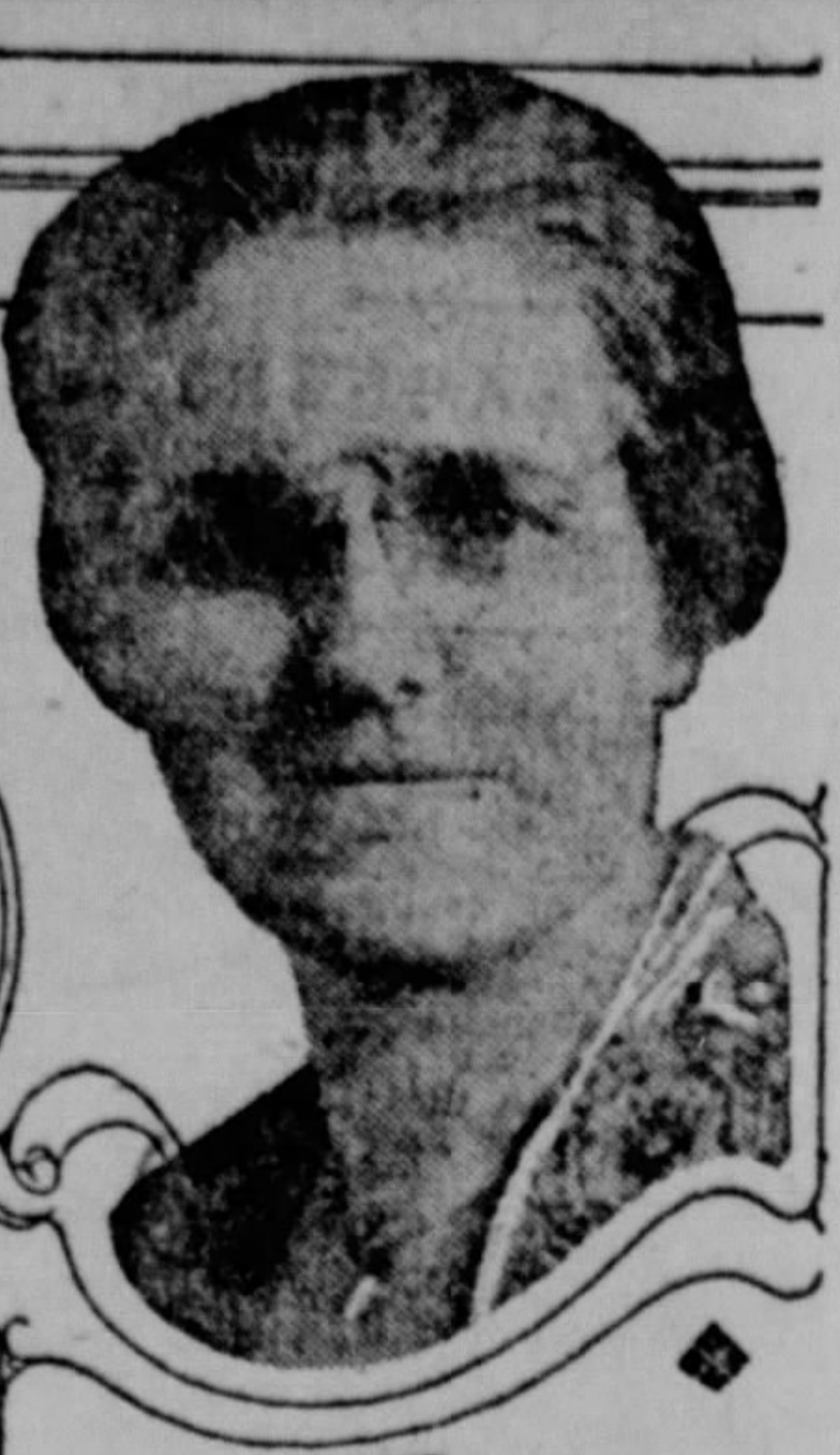
- Perkins in a 1920 publication.
- Born: Maude Brown; June 2, 1874; Bridgeport, New York, U.S.
- Died: December 13, 1932 (aged 58); Syracuse, New York, U.S.
- Other name: Maude Slaton
- Occupations: educator; temperance reformer

Maude B. Perkins (née, Brown; after first marriage, Perkins; after second marriage, Slaton; 1874-1932) was an American educator and temperance reformer. She was affiliated with the New York state, Alabama, and the National Woman's Christian Temperance Union (WCTU) organizations. Perkins served as the national general secretary of the Young People’s Branch of the WCTU (1919-1927), which then included both college and general activities; and for six years as director of the Intercollegiate Prohibition Association, the Student Department of the World League Against Alcoholism.

== Early life and education ==
Maude Brown was born at Bridgeport, New York, on June 2, 1874.

She was educated in the public school of Bridgeport, at Chittenango High School, and at Syracuse University.

== Career ==
After leaving the university, Perkins taught school for one year near Chittenango.

Perkins became a familiar name to members of the WCTU through her long association with that organization. She served for eleven years as president of the East Syracuse, New York WCTU, and was for nine years, recording secretary of the Onondaga County, New York Union. She was general secretary of the Young People’s Branch (YPB) of the New York State WCTU for five years, following which she served for four years (1915-19) as college secretary for the National WCTU. From 1919 to 1927, she was national general secretary of the Young People’s Branch of the WCTU, which then included both college and general activities. In this capacity, she attended numerous State WCTU conventions, reporting at the annual convention of the National Union at Minneapolis (1927) the progress made by the Union among the young people of the U.S.

Perkins also served the National WCTU as a member of the National Jubilee Committee of Ten (1921).

She was a delegate of the National YPB to the Fifteenth International Congress Against Alcoholism, Washington, D.C. (1920); and the World's WCTU convention in London in April 1920

She was a delegate to the International Convention of the World League Against Alcoholism, Toronto (1922). At this convention, she was a member of the committee on resolutions. She also acted as a member of the Standing Committee on the Efficiency Standard of Organizers and Lecturers for the National WCTU.

Perkins became a national organizer and lecturer after her relinquishment of the YPB secretaryship in October 1927. She was for six years a director of the Intercollegiate Prohibition Association, the Student Department of the World League Against Alcoholism.

After moving to Alabama, she served as its WCTU State Vice-President.

Her work in the National WCTU led to extensive European travel.

== Personal life ==
Her first husband, Henry J. Perkins, died in 1916. She married Dr. Samuel Toliver Slaton, a Methodist minister of Birmingham, Alabama, on October 29, 1927.

Maude Brown Perkins Slaton died in Syracuse, New York on December 13, 1932.
