= Oneida Lake Congregational Church =

Historic church in New York, United States

- U.S. National Register of Historic Places
- Location within New York Location within the United States
- Location: 2508 NY 31, Oneida Lake, New York
- Coordinates: 43°9′28″N 75°49′45″W
- Area: less than one acre
- Built: 1824
- Architectural style: Federal, Greek Revival
- NRHP reference No.: 06000159
- Added to NRHP: March 22, 2006

Oneida Lake Congregational Church is a historic Congregational church located at Oneida Lake, Madison County, New York. The church was established in 1814, and the building was built in 1824. It is a post-and-beam structure sheathed in clapboard siding and measures approximately 38 feet by 48 feet, sitting on a stone foundation. A 36-foot by 22-foot addition was built in 1922, with another 40-foot by 22-foot addition built in 1998. The front facade features a Greek Revival style enframement around the main entrance and pediment. The low-pitched gable roof is topped by a two tiered tower.

It was added to the National Register of Historic Places in 2006.
