= Intercollegiate Prohibition Association =

American college organization (1901–1976)

The Intercollegiate Prohibition Association was established in Chicago, Illinois, in 1901. By 1903, it was reported to be the largest college organization in the United States. It conducted "an inquiry" among 158 colleges and universities in 1923 and reported that 136 institutions were in favor of prohibition, eight were against it, and 14 were undetermined. It additionally reported that at 80 out of the 136 institutions in favor of prohibition, support was either by an overwhelming majority or was unanimous. In 1934, a year after the repeal of prohibition, the name was changed to the Intercollegiate Association for the Study of Alcohol. It ceased operations in 1976, and turned its archives over to the Ohio Historical Society.

== Notable people ==
- Maude B. Perkins (1874-1932), six years, director of the Intercollegiate Prohibition Association

== Sources ==
- Ohio Historical Society
- Wittenberg University Library
