= Chittenango, New York =

Chittenango, New York Chu-de-nääng′ (Oneida)
- Village
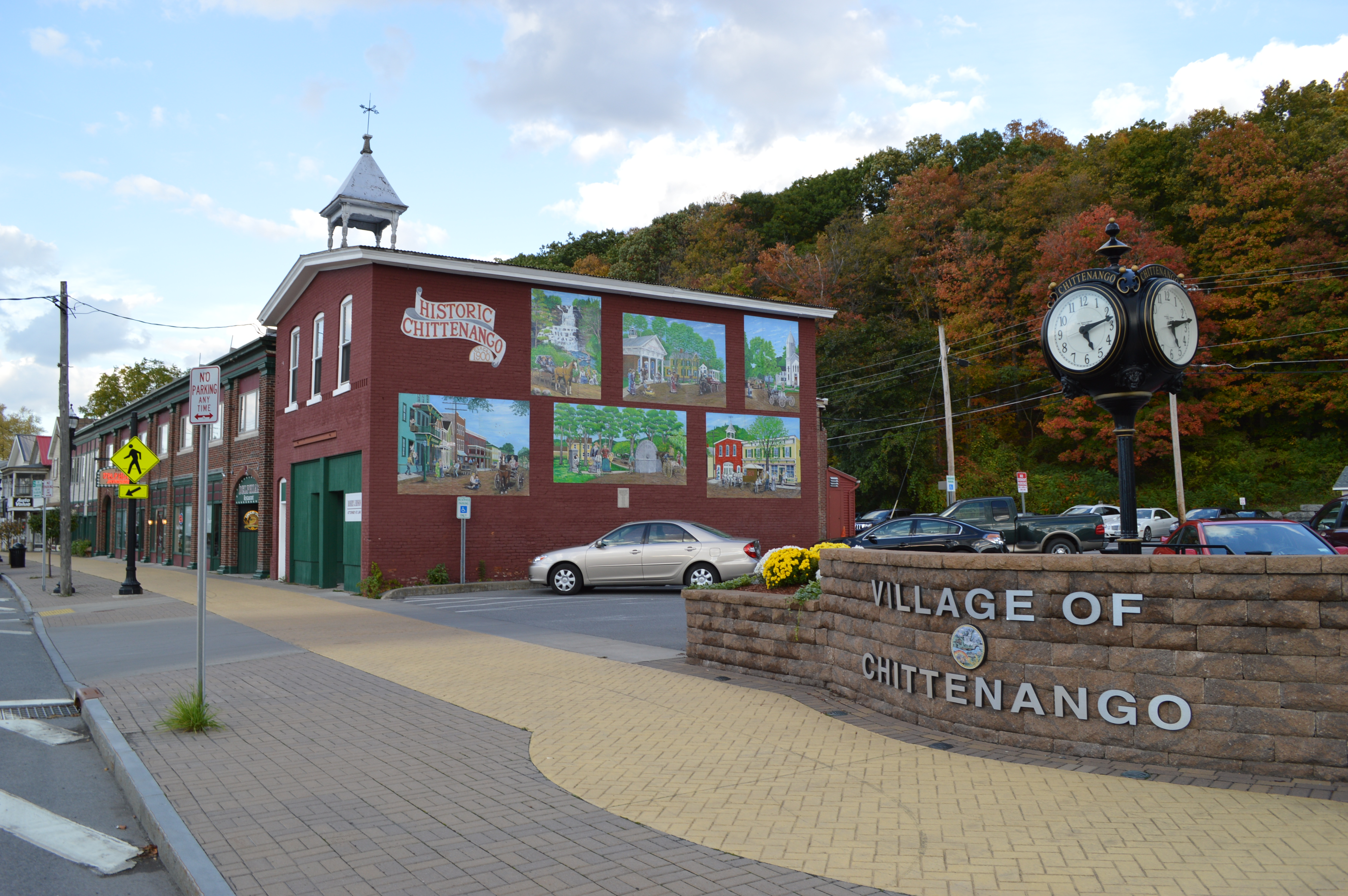

- Location within New York Location within the United States
- Coordinates: 43°2′45″N 75°52′26″W
- Country: United States
- State: New York
- County: Madison
- Town: Sullivan

Government
  - Mayor: Louis Cianfrocco
  - Village Clerk/Treasurer: Karen Hawkins

Area
  - Total: 2.48 sq mi (6.43 km^{2})
  - Land: 2.48 sq mi (6.43 km^{2})
  - Water: 0 sq mi (0.00 km^{2})
- Elevation: 453 ft (138 m)

Population (2020)
  - Total: 4,896
  - Density: 1,971.01/sq mi (761.01/km^{2})
- Time zone: UTC-5 (Eastern (EST))
  - Summer (DST): UTC-4 (EDT)
- ZIP Code: 13037
- Area code: 315
- FIPS code: 36-15561
- GNIS feature ID: 0969996
- Website: chittenango.gov

Chittenango is a village in Madison County, New York, United States. It is in the southern part of the town of Sullivan. The population was 4,896 at the 2020 census. Chittenango is the birthplace of L. Frank Baum, author of The Wonderful Wizard of Oz.

== History ==
The name of the village is derived from the Oneida name for Chittenango Creek, Chu-de-nääng′, meaning "where the water falls down". While the name "Chittenango" is often thought by locals to mean "river flowing north" or "where the waters divide and run north", a reference to the direction of water flow from the creek's point of origin to Oneida Lake, there is no derivation for these alternatives. On an 1825 map of the area, the village is called Chittening, a name used by early settlers which is thought to be derived directly from Chu-de-nääng′. According to American anthropologist Lewis H. Morgan, who studied Iroquois customs and language in his 1851 book League of the Iroquois, the name "Chittenango" may have come from Chu-de-nääng′ Ga-hun′-da, a redundant combination of the Oneida terms for "Chittenango Creek" (Chu-de-nääng′) and "creek" (Ga-hun′-da).

Initial growth of the village is largely attributed to the construction of the Erie Canal, which officially opened in 1825, joining Buffalo on Lake Erie with Albany, the capital of New York, and the Hudson River. The Erie Canal passes just north of the village. The Chittenango Canal Company, incorporated in 1818, constructed a canal 1.5 miles (2.4 km) in length connecting Chittenango to the Erie Canal. The village became a virtual canal town upon the construction of the Chittenango Canal Boat Landing, which featured a three-bay dry dock where canal boats were built and repaired. The canal brought prosperity, growth and expansion to the village. It created a need for inns, hotels and restaurants, and area farms and factories found the canal useful as an inexpensive and easy way to ship goods further along the canal or beyond. Because the canal connected to the Hudson River, boats were able to ship goods south to the metropolis of Manhattan.

Development increased considerably with the activities of John B. Yates, who opened and operated grist and saw mills, a woolen mill, stores, and founded the village's first church in 1828, the Dutch Reformed Church, now the First Presbyterian Church of Chittenango.

The village was incorporated on March 15, 1842. At the time, it contained between 900 and 1,000 inhabitants, about 180 dwellings, three churches, the Yates Polytechnic Institute, a large woolen factory, two large water lime factories, one flouring mill, three taverns and ten stores. In 1853, the first bank in the village, the Chittenango Bank, was organized and began business with capital of $110,000, which increased to $150,000 one year later. The bank closed business nearly one decade later, and in December 1863 the First National Bank of Chittenango was organized, occupying the same building erected by the first bank. This bank also closed down in 1883.

Soon after the incorporation of the village, the first fire company and engine house was built in 1843.

The first newspaper in the village was the Chittenango Herald, established in 1831 by Isaac Lyon. It later bore successively the name of the Chittenango Republican, Chittenango Phoenix, and Democratic Gazette, until it was discontinued in 1853. In 1869 the Madison County Times was established and papers were published until 1975, at which time the Chittenango-Bridgeport Times was formed. This paper ran until 2009 when it merged with other Syracuse area papers to form the current Eagle Newspapers.

The Chittenango Pottery Company, largely owing its early success to its location near the Chittenango Landing, was established in 1897. After burning down twice, the present, now abandoned brick structure was erected. After years of neglect and disrepair, the building was demolished in 2015.

The Chittenango Pottery and St. Paul's Church are listed on the National Register of Historic Places.

== Geography ==
Chittenango is located in northwestern Madison County at 43°2′45″N 75°52′26″W (43.045901, -75.873785), in the southern part of the town of Sullivan. State Routes 5 and 13 pass through the village center as Genesee Street. NY 5 leads east 12 miles (19 km) to Oneida and west 16 miles (26 km) to the center of Syracuse, while NY 13 follows NY 5 to the east as far as Canastota, then turns north toward Sylvan Beach on Oneida Lake. To the south, NY 13 leads 9 miles (14 km) to Cazenovia. NY 173 has its eastern terminus at Chittenango and leads southwest 6 miles (10 km) to Manlius.

According to the U.S. Census Bureau, the village of Chittenango has a total area of 2.5 square miles (6.5 km^{2}), all of it recorded as land. Chittenango Creek passes through the village center, running north to enter Oneida Lake north of Bridgeport.

== Climate ==
The climate can range from hot and often humid summers to very cold winters.

Climate data for Chittenango, New York
Month	Jan	Feb	Mar	Apr	May	Jun	Jul	Aug	Sep	Oct	Nov	Dec	Year
Record high °F (°C)	70 (21)	69 (21)	87 (31)	92 (33)	96 (36)	100 (38)	102 (39)	101 (38)	98 (37)	87 (31)	81 (27)	72 (22)	102 (39)
Mean daily maximum °F (°C)	31 (−1)	34 (1)	43 (6)	56 (13)	68 (20)	77 (25)	82 (28)	80 (27)	71 (22)	60 (16)	47 (8)	36 (2)	57 (14)
Mean daily minimum °F (°C)	14 (−10)	16 (−9)	24 (−4)	35 (2)	46 (8)	55 (13)	60 (16)	59 (15)	51 (11)	40 (4)	32 (0)	21 (−6)	38 (3)
Record low °F (°C)	−26 (−32)	−26 (−32)	−16 (−27)	7 (−14)	25 (−4)	34 (1)	44 (7)	38 (3)	25 (−4)	18 (−8)	4 (−16)	−26 (−32)	−26 (−32)
Average precipitation inches (mm)	2.60 (66)	2.12 (54)	3.02 (77)	3.39 (86)	3.39 (86)	3.71 (94)	4.02 (102)	3.56 (90)	4.15 (105)	3.20 (81)	3.77 (96)	3.12 (79)	40.05 (1,016)
Source: weather.com

== Demographics ==
Historical population
Census	Pop.	Note	%±
1870	968		—
1880	954		−1.4%
1890	792		−17.0%
1900	787		−0.6%
1910	678		−13.9%
1920	650		−4.1%
1930	815		25.4%
1940	885		8.6%
1950	1,307		47.7%
1960	3,180		143.3%
1970	3,605		13.4%
1980	4,290		19.0%
1990	4,734		10.3%
2000	4,855		2.6%
2010	5,081		4.7%
2020	4,896		−3.6%
U.S. Decennial Census

=== 2020 census ===
As of the 2020 census, Chittenango had a population of 4,896. The median age was 40.3 years. 22.8% of residents were under the age of 18 and 17.5% of residents were 65 years of age or older. For every 100 females, there were 90.7 males, and for every 100 females age 18 and over, there were 88.5 males.

94.8% of residents lived in urban areas, while 5.2% lived in rural areas.

There were 2,022 households in Chittenango, of which 30.2% had children under the age of 18 living in them. Of all households, 46.0% were married-couple households, 17.8% were households with a male householder and no spouse or partner present, and 27.7% were households with a female householder and no spouse or partner present. About 30.7% of all households were made up of individuals, and 11.8% had someone living alone who was 65 years of age or older.

There were 2,099 housing units, of which 3.7% were vacant. The homeowner vacancy rate was 1.2% and the rental vacancy rate was 4.3%.

Racial composition as of the 2020 census
Race	Number	Percent
White	4,488	91.7%
Black or African American	46	0.9%
American Indian and Alaska Native	28	0.6%
Asian	36	0.7%
Native Hawaiian and Other Pacific Islander	0	0.0%
Some other race	30	0.6%
Two or more races	268	5.5%
Hispanic or Latino (of any race)	118	2.4%

=== 2010 census ===
As of the census of 2010, there were 5,081 people, 1,993 households, and 1,380 families residing in the village. The population density was 2,117.1 inhabitants per square mile (817.4/km^{2}). There were 2,085 housing units at an average density of 868.8 per square mile (335.4/km^{2}). The racial makeup of the village was 96.2% White, 1.1% African American, 0.7% Native American, 0.5% Asian, 0.1% from other races, and 1.6% from two or more races. Hispanic or Latino of any race were 1.8% of the population.

There were 1,993 households, out of which 47.5% had children under the age of 18 living with them, 52.1% of households had married couples living together, 13.3% of households had a female householder with no husband present, and 30.8% were non-family households (people living in households with no members related to the householder). 24.2% of all households were made up of individuals, and 9.7% had someone living alone who was 65 years of age or older. The average household size was 2.51 and the average family size was 2.97.

In the village, the population was spread out, with 25.0% under the age of 18 years, 7.1% from 18 to 24 years, 11.6% from 25 to 34 years, 14.4% from 35 to 44 years, 16.7% from 45 to 54 years, 12.1% from 55 to 64 years, and 13.0% who were 65 years of age or older. The median age was 39.8 years. For every 100 females, there were 89.0 males. For every 100 females age 18 and over, there were 86.2 males.

Detailed socioeconomic information collected during past censuses was not collected during the 2010 Census. The 2010 Census used only a short form asking ten basic questions, including name, sex, age, date of birth, ethnicity, race, and homeownership status.

=== 2000 census ===
According to the 2000 Census, the median income for a household in the village was $43,750, and the median income for a family was $50,179. Males had a median income of $34,787 versus $25,902 for females. The per capita income for the village was $20,014. About 4.1% of families and 6.2% of the population were below the poverty line, including 7.1% of those under age 18 and 8.8% of those age 65 or over.

== Education ==
The Chittenango School District enrolls about 2,350 K-12 students in two elementary schools (K-4), one middle school (5–8) and one high school (9–12). The district is one of 23 members of the Onondaga-Cortland-Madison BOCES, and employs about 210 instructional staff and 160 additional support staff.

== Transportation ==
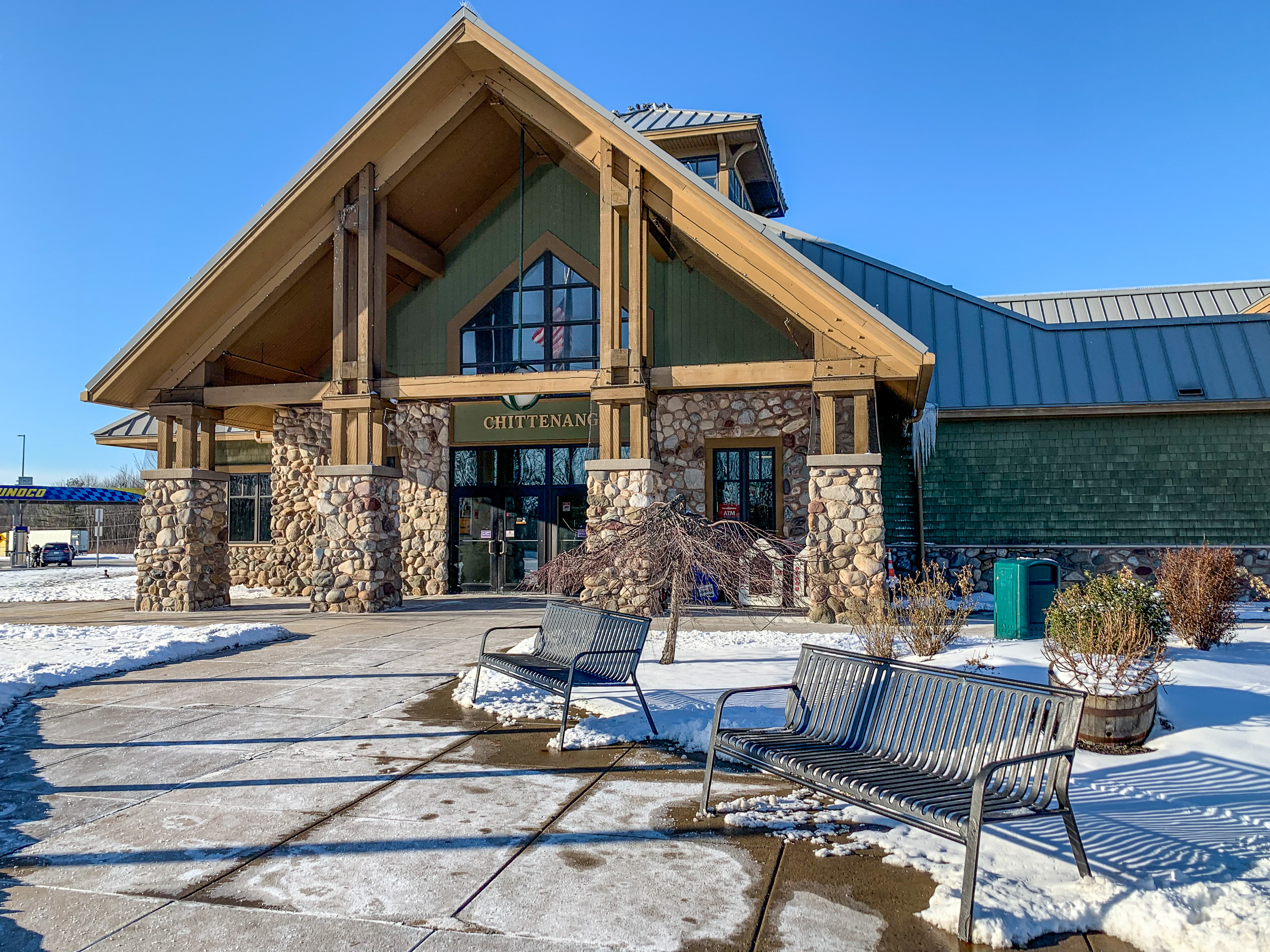
Chittenango travel plaza westbound on I-90

Luther Airport is located 1.15 mi (1.85 km) southeast of the central business district of Chittenango. It is a small, private grass strip, home to several small propeller aircraft including a biplane.

Interstate 90, the New York State Thruway, passes 3 miles (5 km) north of the village. Exit 34A on the Thruway, 14 miles (23 km) west of the village, is signed for Chittenango, while Exit 34 at Canastota, 7 miles (11 km) east of Chittenango, also provides access. The Chittenango travel plaza (rest area) serves westbound traffic on Interstate 90 4 miles (6 km) west of Exit 34.

== Culture ==
Chittenango holds a three-day annual festival called Oz-Stravaganza!, formerly called OzFest, to celebrate the literary works of author L. Frank Baum, who was born in Chittenango on May 15, 1856. The children's novel The Wonderful Wizard of Oz was published on May 17, 1900. The weekend-long festival, usually held during the first Friday/Saturday of June and the weekend thereof, includes amusement rides, and a parade, which features many community groups. The parade has also featured actors and actresses who played Munchkins in the 1939 film The Wizard of Oz, including Jerry Maren, Karl Slover, Meinhardt Raabe, and Margaret Williams Pellegrini.

Oz-Stravaganza! was cancelled during 2020 and 2021 due to health concerns over COVID-19. As Covid restrictions were gradually lifted, the festival came back in 2022, though on a smaller scale, with a lower amount of vendors than previous festival years.

The Wizard of Oz theme continues beyond the annual festival. The village is the home of the International L. Frank Baum & All Things Oz Historical Foundation. The group is a 501(c)3 non-profit, and is 100% volunteer run. It is Chartered by the NY State Board of Regents. The organization coordinates the annual Oz-Stravaganza festival and also the All Things Oz Museum located in the historic village downtown. The museum features a collection of original costumes and props from the OZ universe, as well as collectibles and Baum family heirlooms. The foundation collection is nearly 15,000 items, and 1,200 - 1,400 are on exhibit at any time.

In 1982, the village installed a brick sidewalk on either side of the downtown portion of Genesee Street which was painted yellow as an homage to the yellow brick road from the novels and film. The sidewalk required regular upkeep as the color would fade over time and the bricks would chip and crack due to the freeze-thaw cycles in the colder months and regular use throughout the year. As part of a downtown Chittenango revitalization project in 2007, the sidewalks were replaced with concrete which was then stamped and colored to replicate the yellow brick road. The old bricks have been made available to purchase at the All Things Oz museum and during the festival to raise money for the town's festival. In 2017, the village also added a yellow brick road sidewalk to Dr. West memorial park where the annual Oz-stravaganza festival is held.

Chittenango and its yellow brick road featured in episode 6 of Michael Portillo's Great American Railroad Journeys shown on the BBC. Chittenango also features a new Wizard of Oz-themed casino that opened on June 2, 2015, called the Yellow Brick Road Casino, operated by the Oneida Indian tribe that also operates the much larger Turning Stone Casino and Resort located near Verona, New York.

== Notable people ==
- John Kirby Allen (1810–1838), co-founder of Houston, Texas and Texas state legislator; partner at the store in Chittenango in 1826
- L. Frank Baum, author of The Wonderful Wizard of Oz; the village holds an annual festival called Oz-Stravaganza! honoring Baum's life and literary works
- Jerry Lawson, professional distance runner, former American record holder (1993) in the marathon with a time of 2:09:35, graduate of Chittenango High School
- Dave Mirra, professional BMX bike athlete
- Lewis Selye, former US congressman
- Daniel Gifford, former CIA officer and author

== Gallery ==
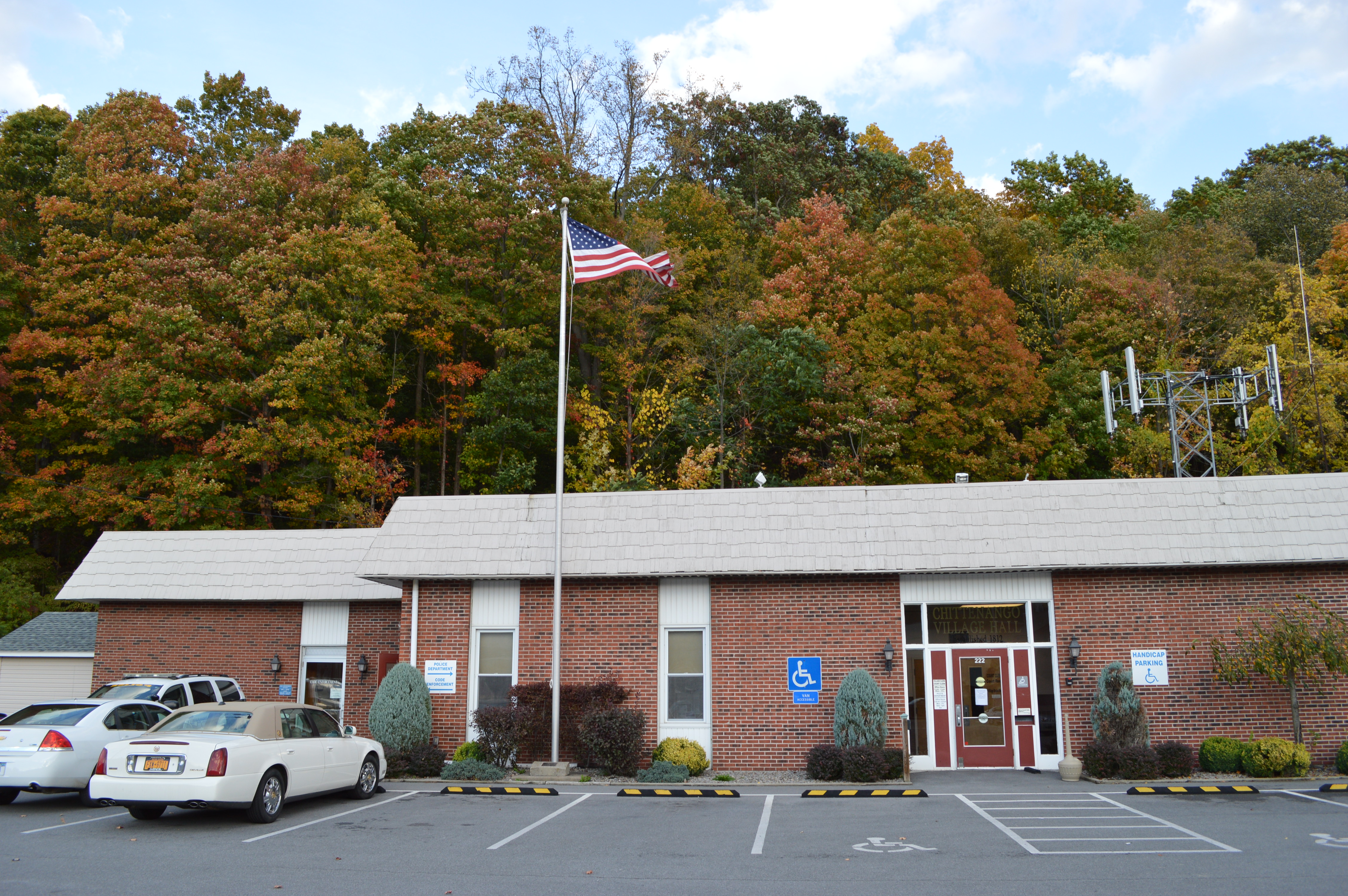
Chittenango Police Department

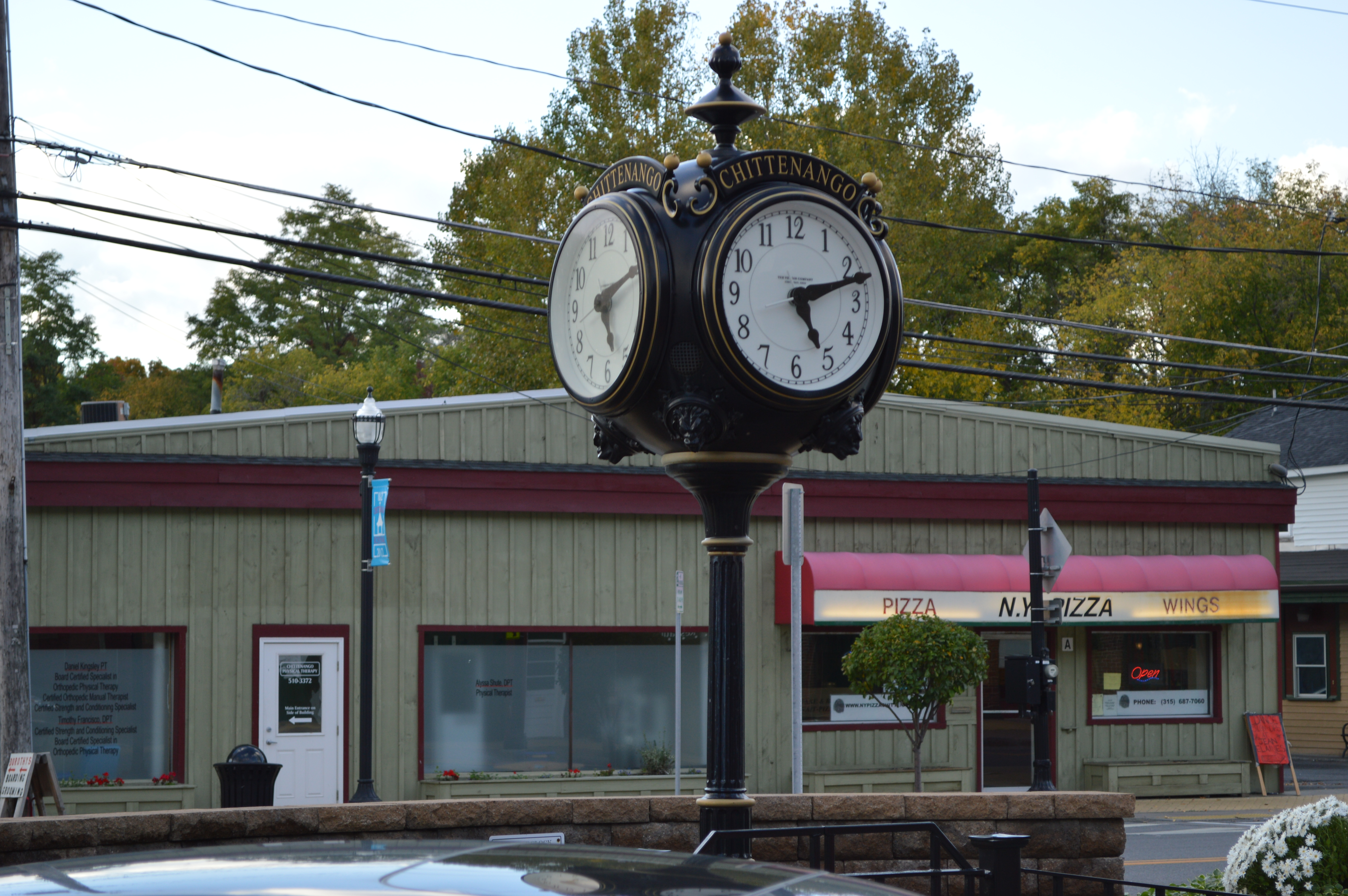
Town clock and pizzeria

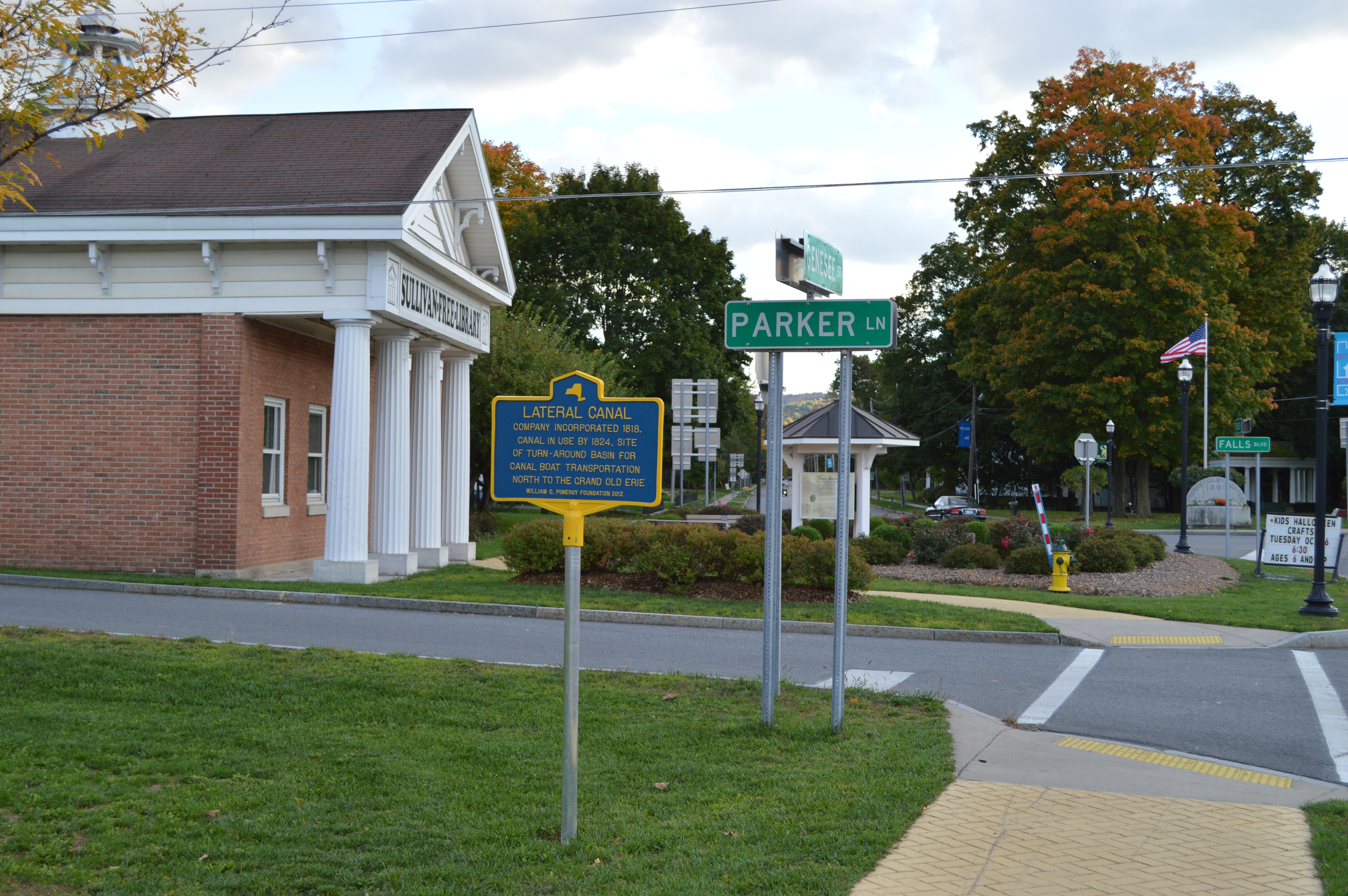
Lateral Canal historic marker

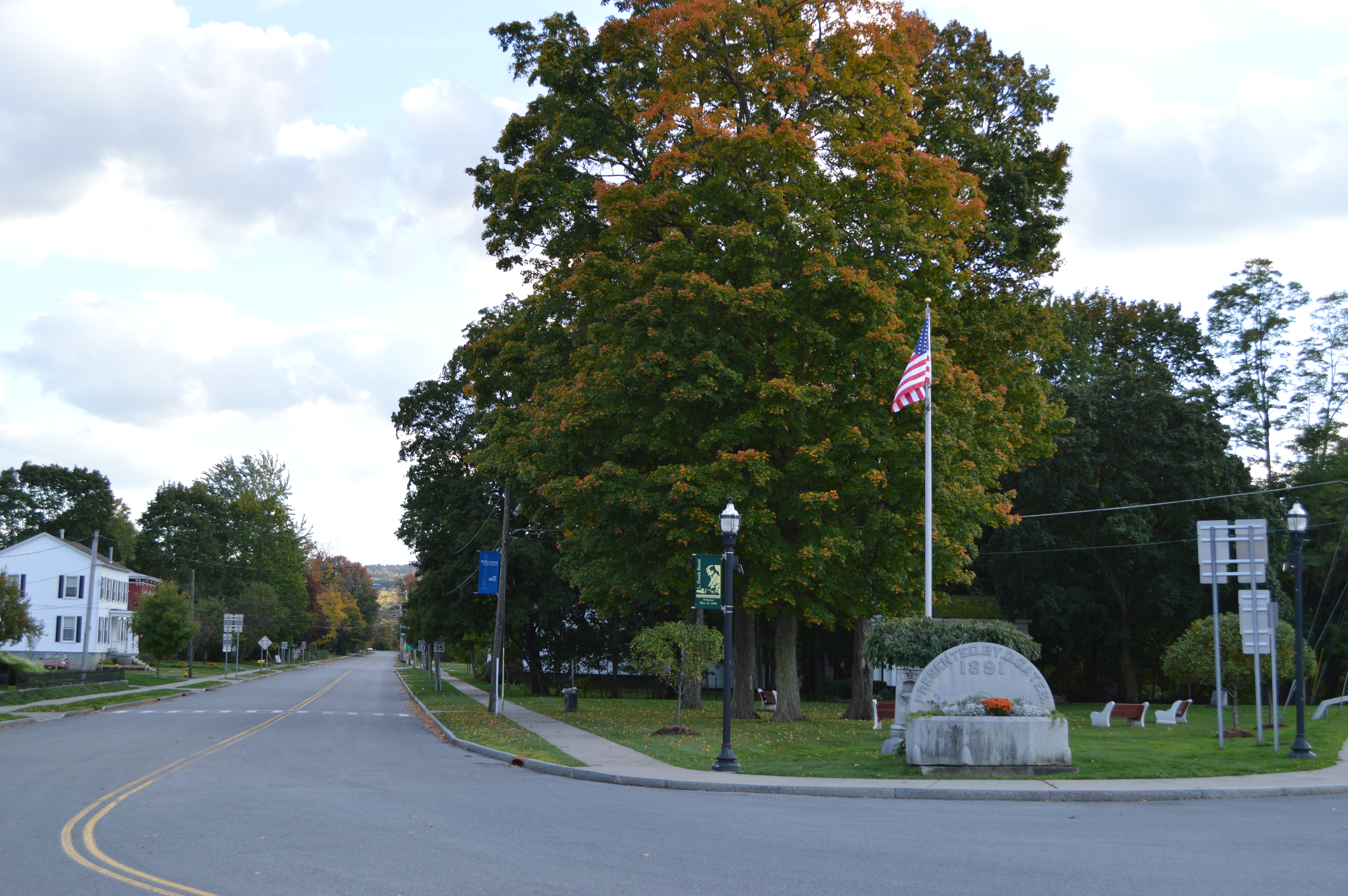
Town park

== See also ==
- Chittenango Falls State Park
- Chittenango Landing Dry Dock Complex
- Chittenango ovate amber snail
- Old Erie Canal State Historic Park
- Wild Animal Park (Chittenango)
