= St. Paul's Church (Chittenango, New York) =

Historic church in New York, United States

- U.S. National Register of Historic Places
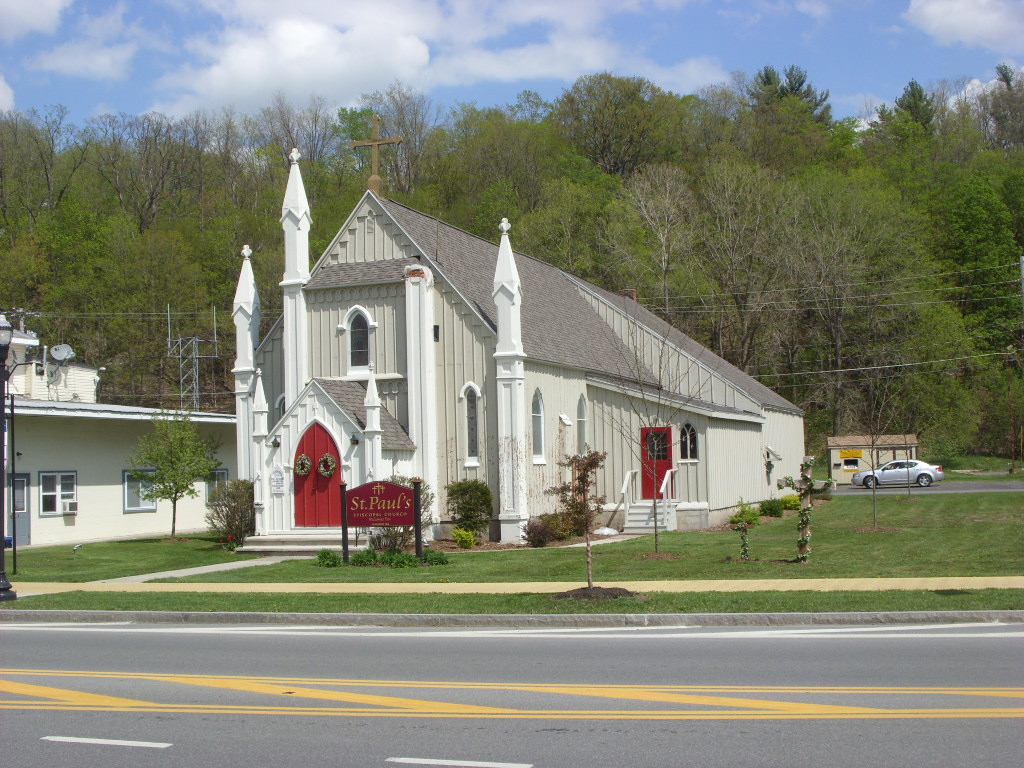
- St. Paul's Church, May 2009

- Location within New York Location within the United States
- Location: 204 Genesee Street, Chittenango, New York
- Coordinates: 43°2′37″N 75°52′0″W
- Area: less than one acre
- Built: 1865
- Architectural style: Gothic Revival
- MPS: Historic Churches of the Episcopal Diocese of Central New York MPS
- NRHP reference No.: 96000956
- Added to NRHP: August 30, 1996

St. Paul's Church is a historic Episcopal church located at 204 Genesee Street in Chittenango, Madison County, New York. It's a three-by-four-bay, Gothic Revival–style structure built with board and batten siding. It was built about 1865 and features a forest of tall pinnacles and decorative trim work on the front facade.

It was listed on the National Register of Historic Places in 1996.

== Gallery ==
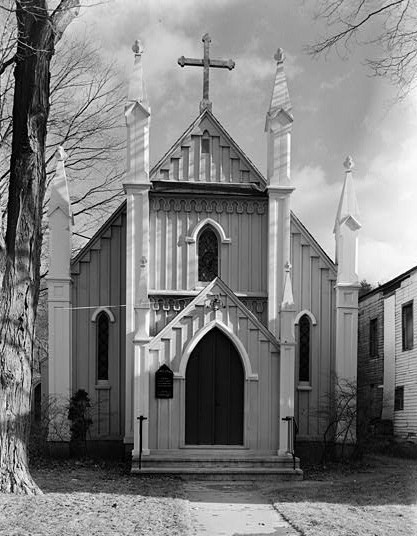
St. Paul's Episcopal Church, HABS Photo
