= Chittenango Pottery =

- U.S. National Register of Historic Places
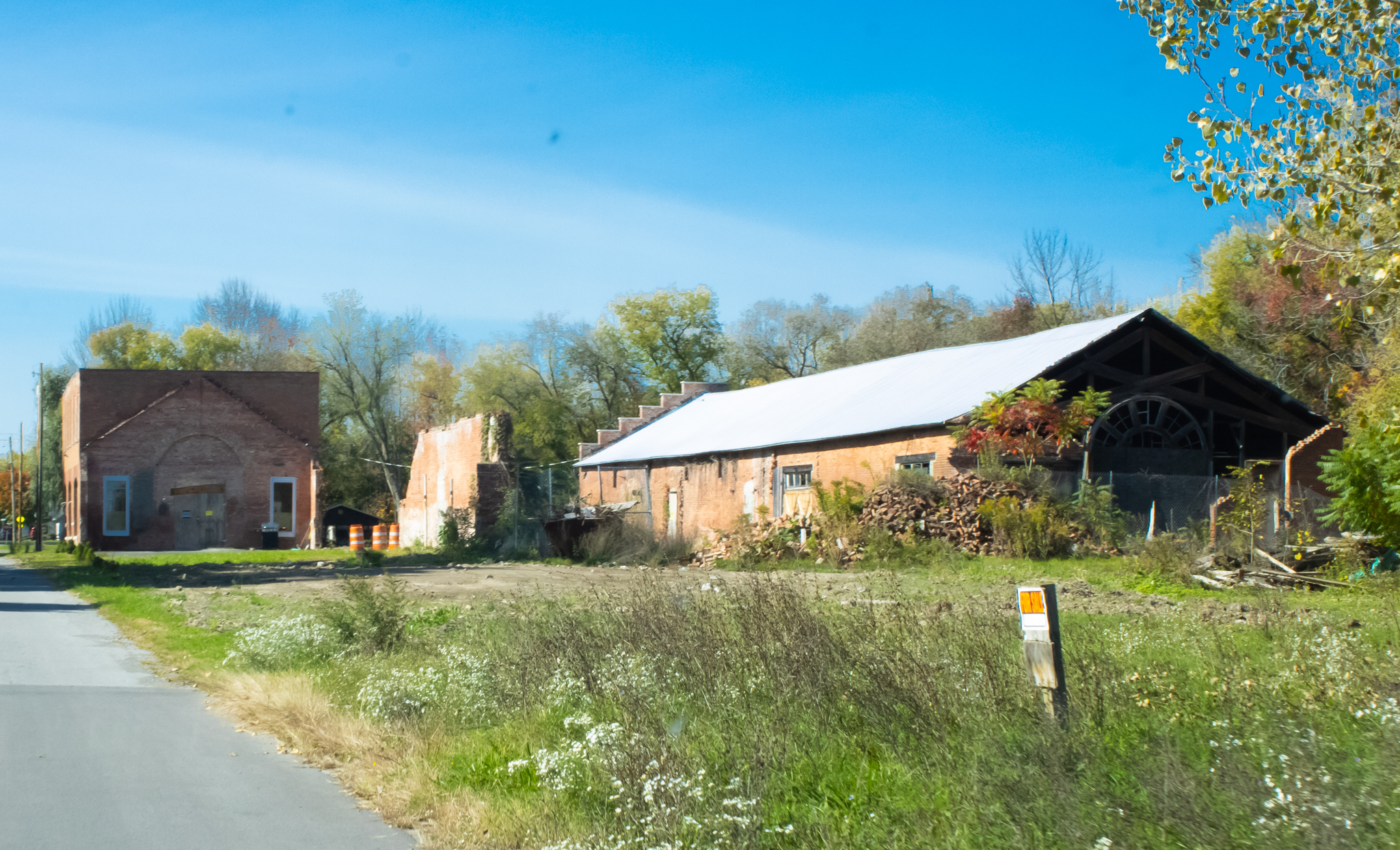

- Location within New York Location within the United States
- Location: 11-13 Pottery St., Chittenango, New York
- Coordinates: 43°3′33.43″N 75°52′7.39″W
- Built: 1898
- NRHP reference No.: 09001083
- Added to NRHP: December 11, 2009

Chittenango Pottery is a historic pottery located at Chittenango, Madison County, New York. The site includes two large brick buildings that were constructed in 1898–1899 for the Chittenango Pottery Company.

It was listed on the National Register of Historic Places in 2009.
