= Peter W. Grayson =

American politician, lawyer, diplomat, and poet (1788–1838)

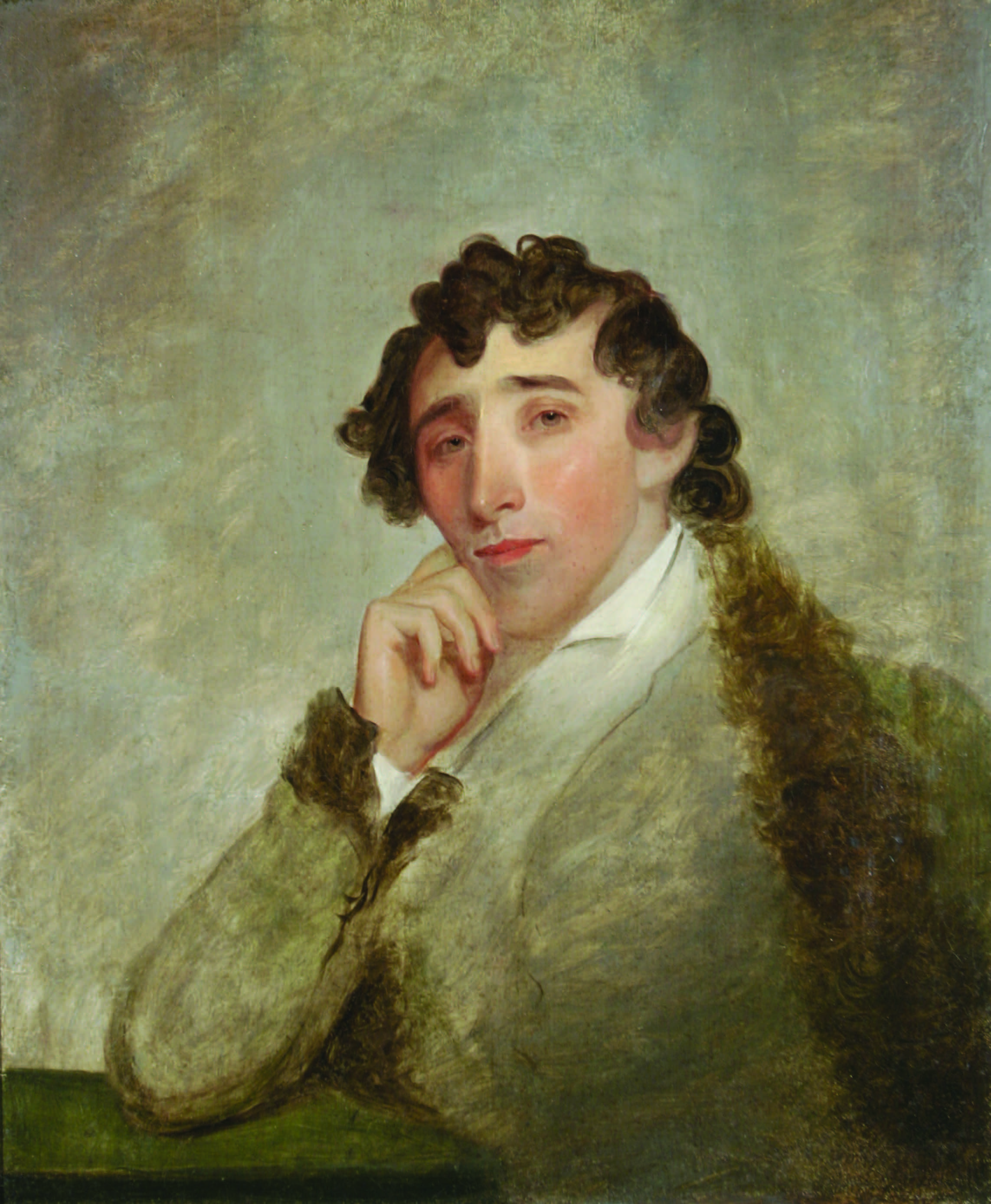
- 1827 portrait by Matthew Harris Jouett

Texas Attorney General
- In office May 4, 1836 – August 1838
- Preceded by: J. Pinckney Henderson
- Succeeded by: John Birdsall

Member of the Kentucky General Assembly
- In office 1828–?

Personal details
- Born: Peter Wagener Grayson; 1788 Bardstown, Virginia, US
- Died: July 9, 1838 (aged 50) Bean Station, Tennessee, US
- Resting place: Eastern Cemetery
- Party: Jacksonian
- Relations: Frederick W. S. Grayson (brother); James D. Breckinridge (brother-in-law); William Grayson (great-uncle); James Monroe
- Occupation: Politician, lawyer, diplomat, poet

Military service
- Allegiance: United States; Republic of Texas
- Battles/wars: War of 1812; Texas Revolution

Peter Wagener Grayson (1788 – July 9, 1838) was an American politician, lawyer, diplomat, and poet.

Born to a political family, Grayson practiced law in Kentucky and served in its general assembly. He moved to Texas in 1830, operating a plantation and becoming an associate of Stephen F. Austin. He served as Texas Attorney General, though after a series of disappointments in his political career, committed suicide. Grayson County, Texas is named for him.

== Early life ==
Grayson was born in 1788, in Bardstown, Virginia, the son of Benjamin Grayson and Caroline Malinda (née Taylor) Grayson. His brother was Kentucky Attorney General Frederick W. S. Grayson, and his sister, Mary Elizabeth Grayson, married James D. Breckinridge. His great-uncle was William Grayson, and he was also related to President James Monroe.

== Career ==
Grayson served in the War of 1812, and also worked as an attorney and poet amidst the war. In 1816, he was postmaster of Bardstown. In 1825, he moved to Louisville, Kentucky. A Jacksonian, he was elected to the Kentucky General Assembly in 1828.

Grayson eventually indebted himself. He moved to San Felipe, Texas in 1830, where he practicied law. He purchased land from Stephen F. Austin, and by 1832, operated a large plantation near Matagorda and owned many slaves.

Grayson, alongside Spencer H. Jack, helped free Austin from Mexico City in late 1834. He volunteered in the Texas Revolution and raised a unit. On October 7, 1835, he was made president of a board of war in Gonzales, serving until Austin arrived, after which he became the aide-de-camp for Austin and Edward Burleson. He was chosen for the Consultation in 1835.

On May 4, 1836, Grayson was appointed Texas Attorney General by President David G. Burnet. On May 14, he signed the Treaties of Velasco, and two weeks thereafter, negotiated annexation by the United States alongside James Collinsworth. He was reappointed Attorney General by President Sam Houston in February 1837, serving until Texas was annexed, in August.

In December 1837, Grayson was made a naval agent. He was offered the office of Texas Ambassador to England, but temporarily declined to negotiate with the United States to fight Mexico out of Texas. While out of the state, another man was found to become ambassador, and Mirabeau B. Lamar had damaged Grayson's reputation by accusing him of being a reprobate whom Grayson was a distant cousin of. He was nominated by Houston for the 1838 Republic of Texas presidential election and named Texas minister plenipotentiary to the United States.

== Personal life and death ==
Grayson suffered from mental illness, namely depression; it greatly affected him throughout the 1820s. On June 20, 1838, he left Galveston en route to Washington, D.C. He reached Bean Station, Tennessee on July 8, where he wrote that a "fiend" had possessed him, which manipulated him into running for president.

On the morning of July 9, Grayson committed suicide by firearm, aged 50. The motivation for his suicide, apart from mental illness, was pinned on having his marriage proposal rejected by a woman he had been courting, as well as drunkenness. He was buried at Eastern Cemetery, in Louisville. In 1846, Grayson County was named for him. In the 1950s, historic maps were discovered which labelled Corpus Christi as "Grayson"; historian Hobart Huson Jr. named Grayson as a potential namesake, as well as cowboy "Mustang" Grayson.
