= 1838 Republic of Texas presidential election =

1838 election in the Republic of Texas

- September 3, 1838
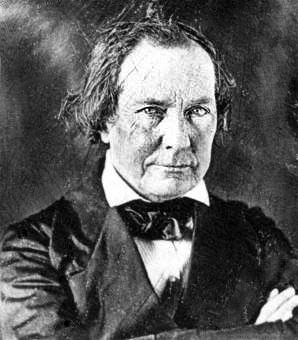

Nominee	Mirabeau Lamar	Robert Wilson
Party	Nonpartisan	Nonpartisan
Popular vote	6,995	252
Percentage	96.5%	3.5%
President before election
Sam Houston
Nonpartisan
Elected President
Mirabeau Lamar
Nonpartisan

The 1838 Republic of Texas presidential election was the second presidential election. It was held on September 3, 1838. By a provision of the constitution, the term of office of the first president was limited to two years, without his being eligible for re-election; succeeding presidents were to hold their office for three years.

The contest was held between Mirabeau Lamar, the vice president of the Republic of Texas and Robert Wilson, the Republic of Texas Senator for Harrisburg and Liberty. Although both candidates were considered nonpartisan, the two were representative of competing factions. Because Texas law did not allow consecutive terms for presidents, incumbent Sam Houston could not run for re-election during this time. Lamar was considered Houston's rival, and although such differences between Houston and Lamar were at the time considered mostly personal in nature, Wilson was considered to be running on behalf of Houston's oppositional faction.

Wilson was at a large disadvantage because he did not announce his candidacy until well after Lamar did, and only because two other previous candidates Peter W. Grayson and James Collinsworth had died earlier in the campaign process. Because the likelihood of Wilson defeating Lamar was considered so improbable, many considered Lamar to be running unopposed.

== Nominations ==
=== Mirabeau B. Lamar ===
On December 1, 1837, eleven of the fourteen members of the Texas Senate addressed Vice President Mirabeau Lamar in a letter in which they encouraged him to accept a nomination. Before he would respond to this letter, six days later he wrote to Thomas Jefferson Rusk to inquire what his intentions were. In his response, Rusk gave Lamar his support, and claimed he would not run against him. It was then in which Lamar gave an affirmative response to the senators that he would run for office.

To nominate him publicly, several public meetings were arranged and took place through the next year. The first meeting took place in Richmond on April 17, 1838, where he and David G. Burnet were nominated, then another in Columbia on the 21st, Galveston on the 23rd, and San Augustine on May 10. On May 19, 1838, a large gathering took place in the Hall of the House of Representatives in Houston, where resolutions were adopted favoring Lamar for the presidency.

=== Robert Wilson ===
Senator Robert Wilson of Harrisburg, who had gained office in the election of 1836, represented the districts of Harrisburg and Liberty, and was still serving a three-year term as senator when he announced his candidacy. Although Wilson was the sole opposition representing the Houston faction after the deaths of Collinsworth and Grayson, he was never taken seriously for the office.

=== Other candidates ===
In the May 26, 1838 issue of the Telegraph and Texas Register, at the request of William Pettus, Edward Burleson, Michel Menard, and Thomas F. McKinney, correspondence regarding Peter W. Grayon's nomination to the presidency was published. The published correspondence detailed that on May 21, 1838, Peter W. Grayson, a former interim Attorney General of Texas, was addressed by thirty-one Texas leaders to consider a nomination. Three days later, Grayson responded that he would accept a candidacy, but acknowledged that he would be absent from Texas during campaigning, as he would depart for Washington D.C. in his role as minister plenipotentiary to the United States. Grayson's candidacy was cut short, as he killed himself on July 9, 1838, while in Bean Station, Tennessee.

Following the death of Grayson, James Collinsworth was then asked to take up the Houstonian party's nomination. The first published report of his candidacy was on June 30, 1838. However, by the following month, Collinsworth also died after jumping off of a boat in Galveston Bay after a week of drunkenness.

Former interim president David G. Burnet was also encouraged to run for the presidency, but declined because he did not want to run against his friend Lamar, and instead ran for vice president with the hopes of the Lamar victory.

== General election ==
=== Campaign ===
During the campaign process, several charges were leveled against Mirabeau Lamar. First, in June 1838, Lamar's opponents claimed that he was constitutionally ineligible for the office of the presidency because he had not been a citizen of Texas for at least three years. In a June 16, 1838 letter written by Lamar to journalists Samuel Whiting of the Houston-based National Intelligencer and J.W.J. Miles, he dismissed the notion of his ineligibility as "mortifying [...] if seriously entertained". Lamar claimed that he had entered Texas in July 1835, with intention to be a citizen, and purchased land rights from the land surveyor of Coles' Settlement from which he could produce a receipt as evidence.

In August, in the Telegraph and Texas Register a defensive editorial was published that refuted an accusation by the Galveston Civilian that Lamar had defrauded the government of one acre of land. The Galveston Civilian later claimed that Lamar was even "partially insane".

=== Results ===
Obtaining an impressive 96.5% of the vote, Mirabeau Lamar defeated Robert Wilson in a landslide. The count was 6,995 in favor of Lamar, while only 252 voted for Wilson.

Burnet was elected vice-president with 3,952 votes (55.4%). Albert Clinton Horton came in second place with 1,971 votes (27.6%) while Joseph Rowe finished third with 1,215 votes (17.0%).
