= John Kirby Allen =

Co-founder of Houston, Texas in 1836

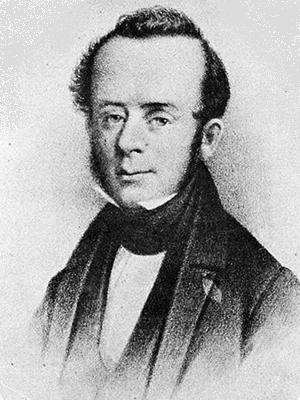

Member of the Republic of Texas House of Representatives from Nacogdoches County
- In office October 3, 1836 – June 13, 1837
- Preceded by: Position established
- Succeeded by: Thomas Jefferson Rusk

Personal details
- Born: 1810 Sullivan, New York, US
- Died: August 15, 1838 (aged 27–28) Houston, Republic of Texas
- Resting place: Founders Memorial Cemetery
- Relations: Augustus Chapman Allen (brother)
- Occupation: Businessman, entrepreneur

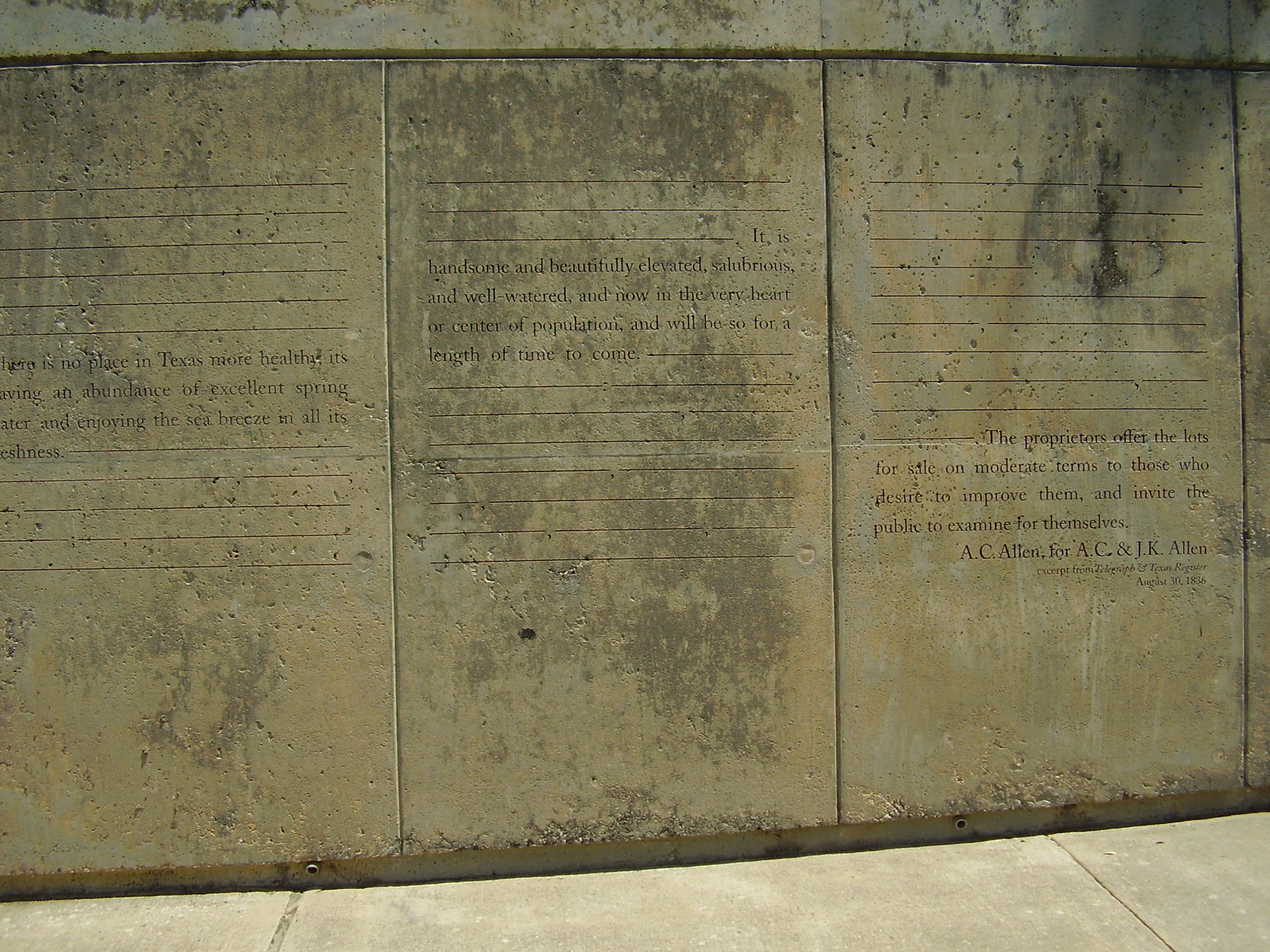
Marker in Downtown Houston commemorating the foundation of Houston by the Allen Brothers – An excerpt from the Telegraph & Texas Register dated August 30, 1836, is visible.

John Kirby Allen (1810 – August 15, 1838) was a co-founder of the city of Houston and a former member of the Republic of Texas House of Representatives. He was born in Canaseraga Village, New York (the present-day hamlet of Sullivan in the Town of Sullivan, New York). He never married. He died of congestive fever on August 15, 1838, and was buried at Founders Memorial Cemetery in Houston, Texas.

== Early years ==
When he was seven years old, John took his first job as a hotel porter in a hotel in Orrville (present-day DeWitt, New York). Three years later, he started working as a clerk in a retail shop. At sixteen, he formed a partnership with a friend operating a hat store at Chittenango, New York, where his brother, Augustus Chapman Allen, was a professor of mathematics. In 1827, John cashed in his interest in the hat store and followed his brother to New York City, where they were investors in H. and H. Canfield Company until 1832. The brothers then moved to Texas.

== In Texas ==
The Allen brothers arrived first in Galveston, Texas and then moved to the small town of San Augustine. In 1833, John Allen and his brother associated with a group of entrepreneurs in Nacogdoches and started operating a business as land speculators.

=== During the Texas Revolution ===
Instead of joining the army when the Texas Revolution started, John and his brother kept supply channels open. At their own expense, they outfitted a ship, the Brutus, to protect the Texas coast and assist troops and supplies from the United States to arrive safely in Texas.

Nevertheless, some members of the Texas provisional government objected to the Allen brothers' activities, and there were rumors that they were engaged in privateering. In January 1836, they sold the Brutus to the Texas Navy, and it became only the second ship in the fledgling Texas Navy. John and Augustus Chapman Allen continued to raise money and operate as receivers and dispensers of supplies and funds for the war effort without charge. Despite the brothers' services, gossip and censure were aimed at the Allens because they were not in the armed services.

=== In politics ===
On August 30, 1836, John Kirby Allen's candidacy for Representative of Nacogdoches County to the first Congress of the Republic of Texas was announced in the Telegraph and Texas Register. He was elected in September, and officially began his term on October 3. There, he served on the president's staff with the rank of major. During this political service, John and his brother Augustus founded the city of Houston. He also continued to operate a shipping business during this time, along with his partner, James Pinckney Henderson.

In Congress, John Allen successfully lobbied to have the newly founded city of Houston named the Republic's capital. This gave Houston the boost it needed to survive its first years of initial development.

On April 13, 1838, Allen was elected to the board of directors of the Galveston City Company, which was a stock company chartered by the Republic of Texas to found the City of Galveston.

== Legacy ==
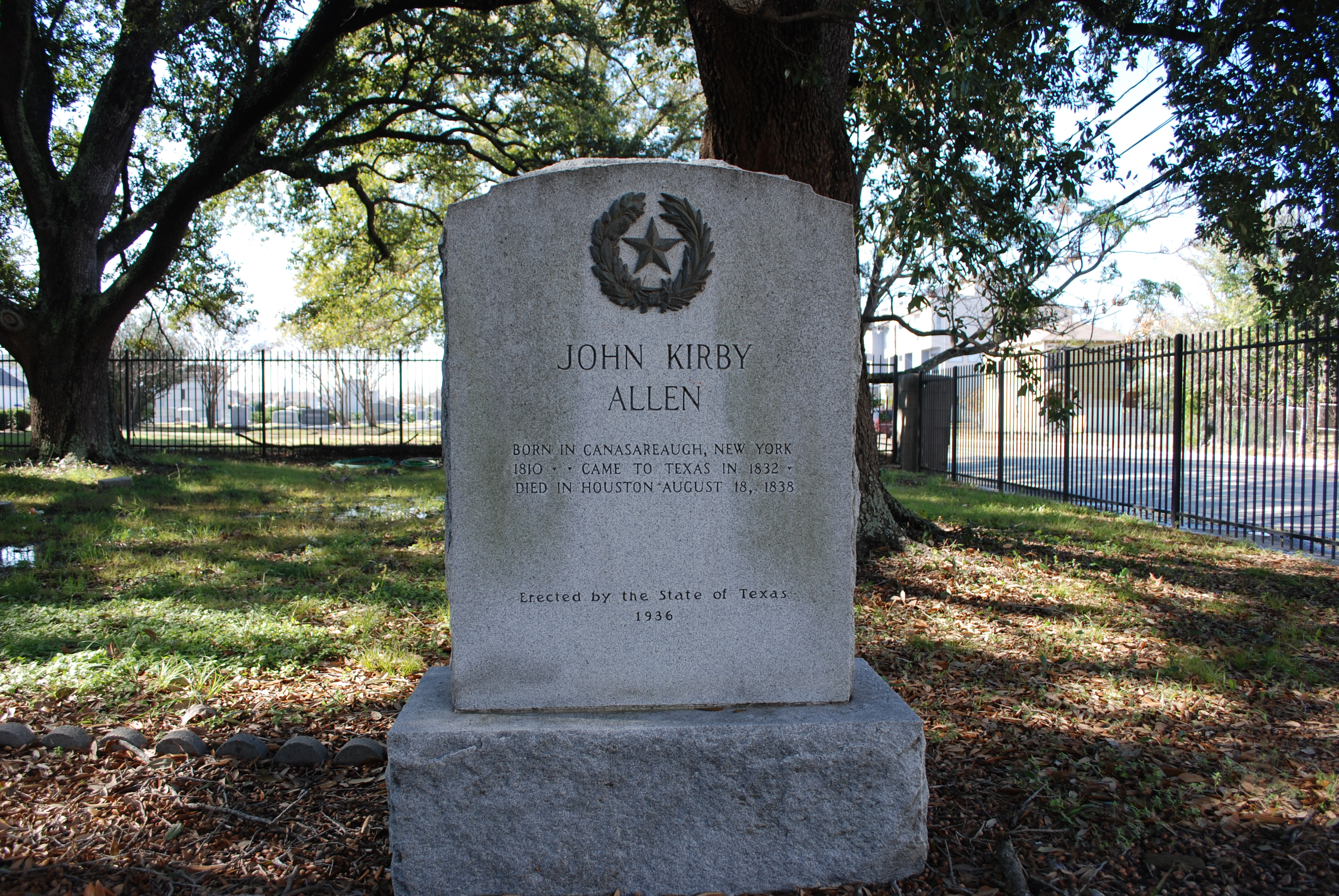
John Kirby Allen's tombstone at Founders Memorial Cemetery

Several Houston landmarks, including Allen Parkway, Allen Center, and Allen's Landing Park, immortalize the names of the city's founders.

He is buried at Founders Memorial Cemetery along with his mother and father as well as most of his siblings.
