= Luther Airport =

- IATA: none; ICAO: none; FAA LID: NK51

Summary
- Airport type: Private
- Owner: Hunter Havener
- Location: Chittenango, New York
- Elevation AMSL: 740 ft / 226 m
- Coordinates: 43°01′45″N 075°50′44″W
- Interactive map of Luther Airport

Runways
Direction	Length		Surface
Direction	ft	m	Surface
9/27	1,700	518	Turf

Statistics (2009)
- Aircraft operations: 2,550
- Source: FAA and NYSDOT

Luther Airport (FAA LID: NK51) is a private use airport located one nautical mile (1.85 km) east of the central business district of Chittenango, a village in the Town of Sullivan in Madison County, New York, United States.

== Facilities and aircraft ==
Luther Airport has one runway with turf surfaces: 9/27 is 1,700 by 80 feet (518 x 24 m). For the 12-month period ending November 3, 2009, the airport had 2,550 general aviation aircraft operations, an average of 212 per month.

== See also ==
- List of airports in New York
