= Founders Memorial Cemetery =

Cemetery in Houston, Texas

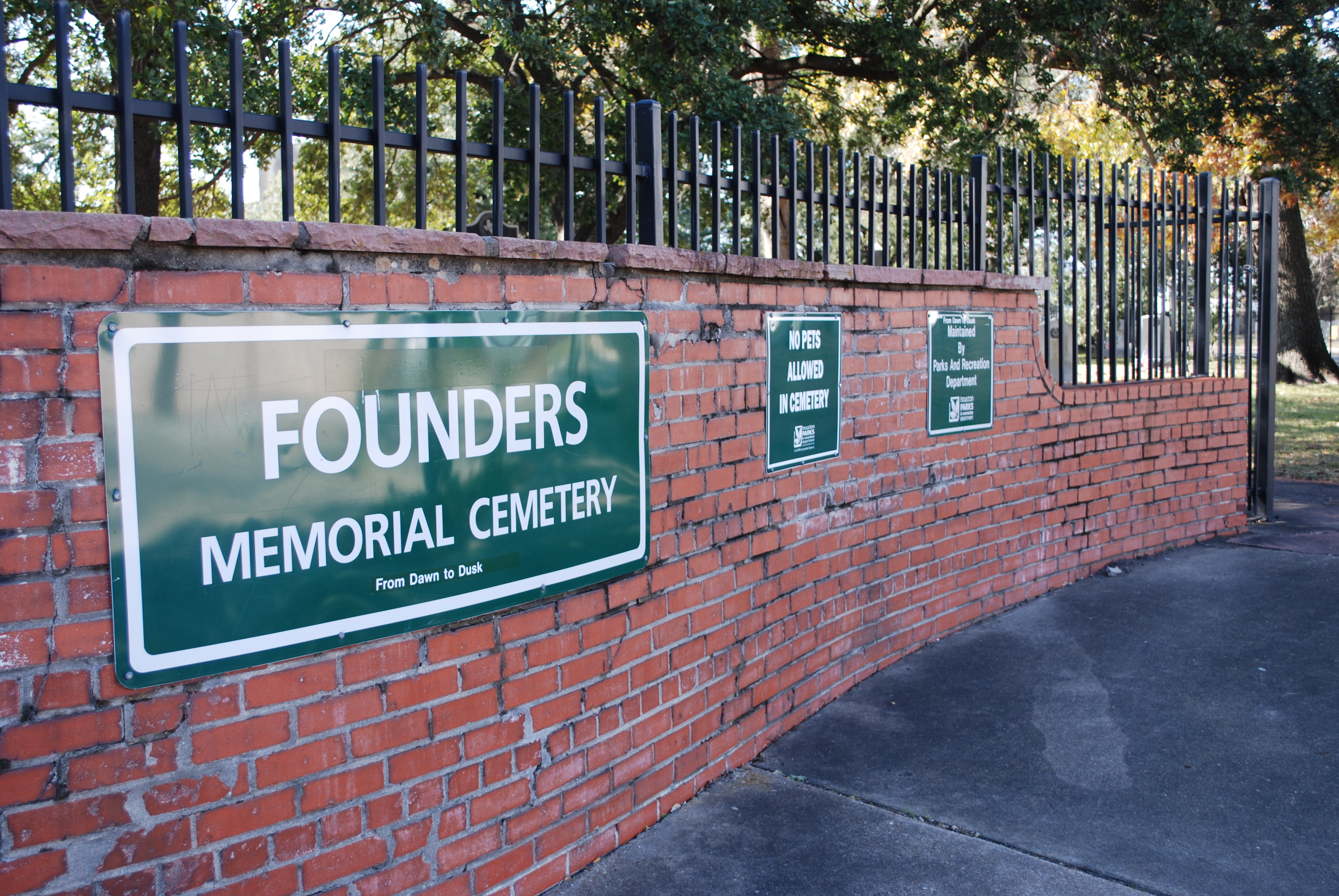
- Entrance wall to Founders Memorial Cemetery
- Interactive map of Founders Memorial Cemetery

Details
- Established: 1836
- Location: Fourth Ward, Houston, Texas
- Country: United States
- Coordinates: 29.7574°N 95.3792°W
- Type: Municipal, public
- Owned by: City of Houston
- Size: 1.5 acres (0.61 ha)
- Find a Grave: Founders Memorial Cemetery
- The Political Graveyard: Founders Memorial Cemetery

Founders Memorial Cemetery, also known as Founders Memorial Park, is the oldest cemetery in Houston, Texas, United States. Founded in 1836, it was originally known as "City Cemetery", and opened in conjunction with the founding of the City of Houston in what is now Fourth Ward near the edge of Downtown Houston. The cemetery is owned and operated by the Houston Parks and Recreation Department, and is also a public park. The two-acre site is a designated "Texas Historic Cemetery" by the Texas Historical Commission, and features many graves from citizens of the Republic of Texas including co-founder of Houston John Kirby Allen and veterans of the Texas Revolution. Consequently, the cemetery contains the second-most Texas Centennial Monuments, behind only the Texas State Cemetery. It lies adjacent to Beth Israel Cemetery, which is the oldest Jewish cemetery in Texas.

== History ==
The cemetery opened in 1836 as simply "City Cemetery" to accommodate a growing number of deaths in Houston. The chosen site was considered to be on the outskirts of town. However, by 1840, the cemetery was nearly full. Another city cemetery at the present-day location of Jefferson Davis Hospital was created, and this site eventually became known as "Old City Cemetery" to differentiate it from others. In April 1936, the cemetery was restored by the San Jacinto Centennial Association, and it was officially named "Founders Memorial Park". In 1947, the Houston Parks and Recreation Department began to maintain the cemetery.

== Notable interments ==
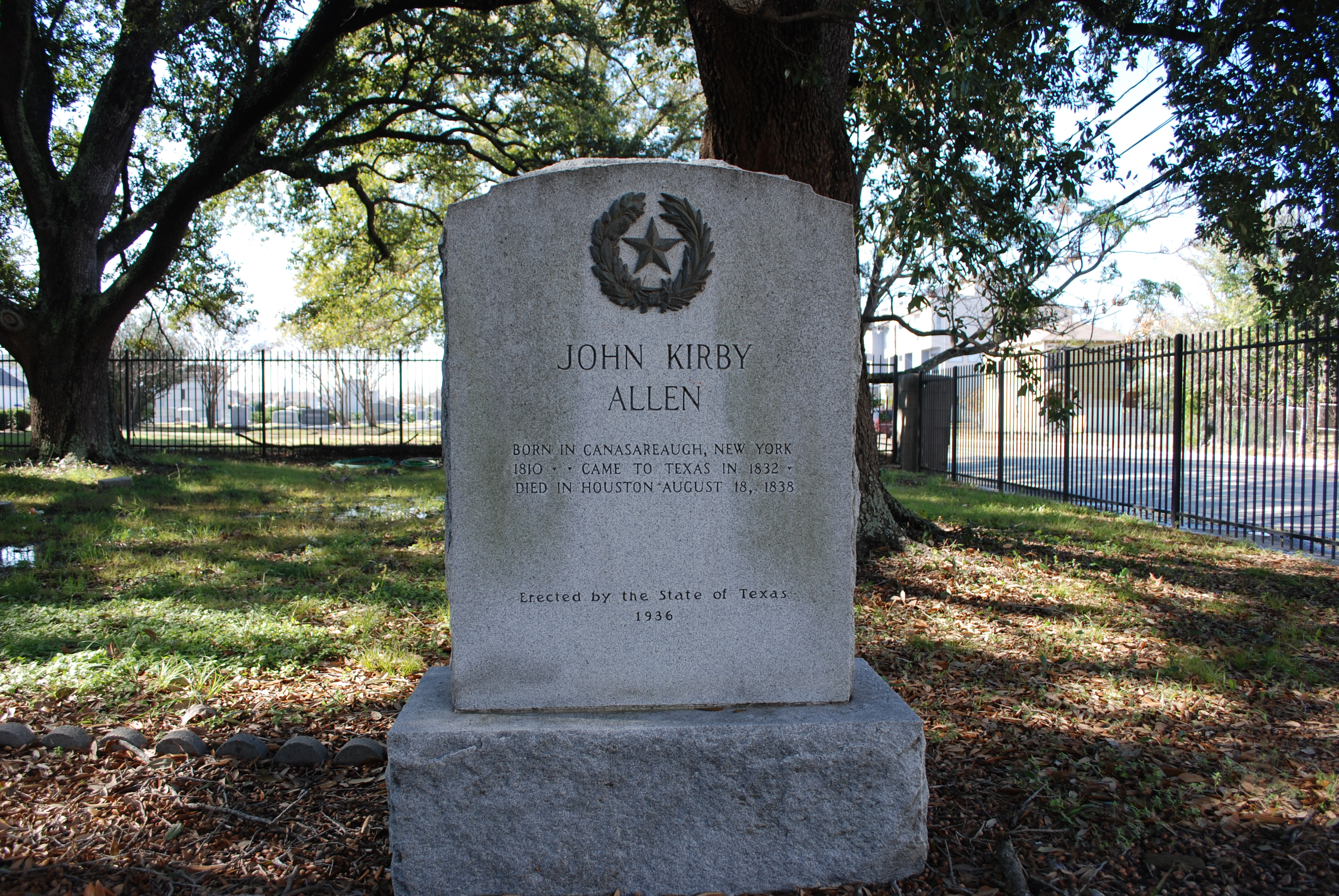
John Kirby Allen's tombstone at Founders Memorial Cemetery

One of the most notable interments of the cemetery is co-founder of Houston, John Kirby Allen. In addition many veterans of the Texas Revolution are interred here. Also interred here is Rebecca Lamar, who was the mother of the second President of the Republic of Texas, Mirabeau Lamar. A cenotaph was erected here for Mary Smith Jones, who was a former First Lady of Texas. The tomb of her first husband, Hugh McCrory, a Texian Army veteran, is located at this cemetery. Also interred at Founders Memorial Cemetery is James Collinsworth, who was a signer of the Texas Declaration of Independence, first Chief Justice of the Texas Supreme Court, an interim Secretary of State of Texas, and Republic of Texas Senator. Another signer of the Texas Declaration of Independence, John W. Moore is located here as well. A friend of William B. Travis, Moore eventually became the first Sheriff of Harris County, and later an alderman of the City of Houston.

== See also ==
- List of cemeteries in Texas
