= Sullivan, New York =

Town in Madison County, New York, US

- Town
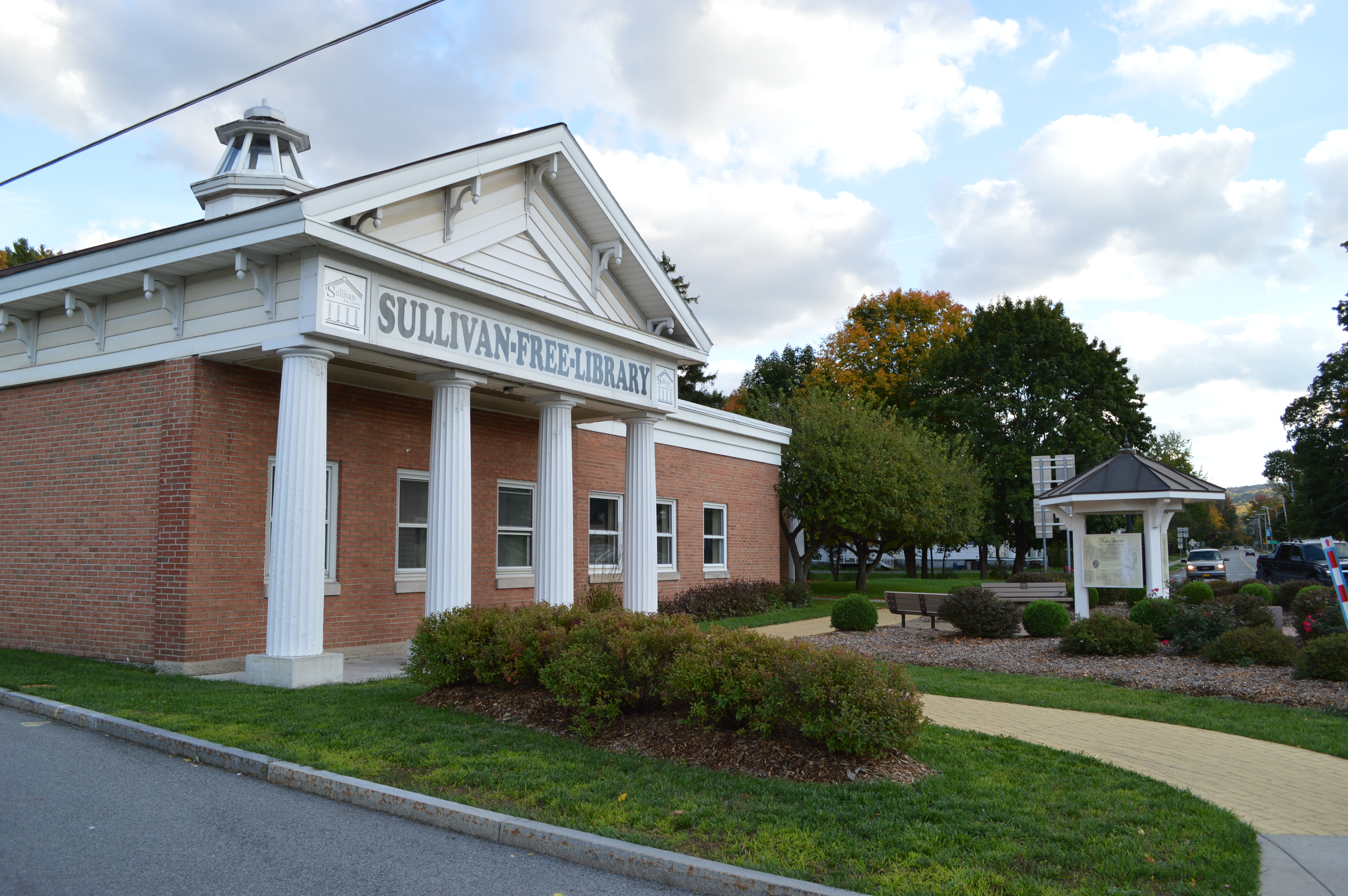
- Sullivan Free Library

- Location within New York Location within the United States
- Coordinates: 43°4′N 75°52′W
- Country: United States
- State: New York
- County: Madison

Government
  - Type: Town Council
  - Town Supervisor: Thomas G. Daviau (R)
  - Town Council: Members' List: • Thomas J. Kopp (R); • William S. Cole (R); • John E. Brzuszkiewicz (R); • David O. Miner (R)

Area
  - Total: 73.34 sq mi (189.9 km^{2})
  - Land: 73.13 sq mi (189.4 km^{2})
  - Water: 0.21 sq mi (0.54 km^{2})
- Elevation: 410 ft (120 m)

Population (2020)
  - Total: 14,794
  - Density: 202.3/sq mi (78.1/km^{2})
- Time zone: UTC-5 (Eastern (EST))
  - Summer (DST): UTC-4 (EDT)
- ZIP Codes: 13030 (Bridgeport); 13037 (Chittenango); 13032 (Canastota); 13035 (Cazenovia); 13082 (Kirkville); 13104 (Manlius)
- Area code: 315
- FIPS code: 36-053-71993
- GNIS feature ID: 0979535
- Website: www.townofsullivanny.gov

Sullivan is a town in Madison County, New York, United States. The population was 14,794 at the 2020 census. The town is named after Revolutionary War general John Sullivan.

== History ==
Settlement began around 1790. The town was established in 1803 from the town of Cazenovia. In 1809, the town was partitioned to form the town of Lenox.

The Chittenango Landing Dry Dock Complex on the Erie Canal was listed on the National Register of Historic Places in 1992.

== Geography ==
Sullivan is in the northwest corner of Madison County. It is bordered to the west by Onondaga County, to the northwest by Oswego County, and to the northeast by Oneida County. The northern border of the town is Oneida Lake, and the northern half of the western border is Chittenango Creek. According to the U.S. Census Bureau, the town has a total area of 73.3 square miles (190 km^{2}), of which 73.1 square miles (189 km^{2}) are land and 0.2 square miles (0.5 km^{2}), or 0.29%, are water.

The New York State Thruway (Interstate 90) crosses center part of the town. The closest access points are Exit 34 to the east in Canastota (New York State Route 13) and Exit 34A to the west near Syracuse (Interstate 481). State Route 31 crosses the northern end of the town, passing through the hamlets of Bridgeport (at the western town line) and Lakeport. NY 31 leads east from Lakeport 15 miles (24 km) to Verona and west 25 miles (40 km) to Baldwinsville. State Route 5 crosses the southern part of Sullivan, passing through the village of Chittenango. NY 5 leads east from Chittenango 12 miles (19 km) to Oneida and west 15 miles (24 km) to downtown Syracuse. State Route 13 joins NY 5 through the southeastern part of Sullivan but leads south from Chittenango 9 miles (14 km) to Cazenovia. State Route 173 leads southwest from Chittenango 6 miles (10 km) to Manlius.

== Demographics ==
Historical population
Census	Pop.	Note	%±
1820	2,932		—
1830	4,077		39.1%
1840	4,390		7.7%
1850	4,764		8.5%
1860	5,233		9.8%
1870	4,921		−6.0%
1880	4,803		−2.4%
1890	4,046		−15.8%
1900	3,778		−6.6%
1910	3,367		−10.9%
1920	3,002		−10.8%
1930	3,383		12.7%
1940	3,775		11.6%
1950	4,905		29.9%
1960	9,369		91.0%
1970	11,969		27.8%
1980	13,371		11.7%
1990	14,622		9.4%
2000	14,991		2.5%
2010	15,339		2.3%
2020	14,794		−3.6%
U.S. Census Bureau

At the 2010 census, there were 15,339 people, 6,114 households and 4,325 families residing in the town. The population density was 209.7 inhabitants per square mile (81.0/km^{2}). There were 6,723 housing units at an average density of 91.7 per square mile (35.4/km^{2}). The racial makeup of the town was 97.2% White, 0.6% African American, 0.4% Native American, 0.4% Asian, 0.2% from other races, and 1.2% from two or more races. Hispanic or Latino of any race were 1.2% of the population.

There were 6,114 households, of which 31.5% had children under the age of 18 living with them, 54.5% were heterosexual married couples living together, 10.8% had a primary female householder, 5.1% had a primary male householder and 29.6% were non-families. 23.2% of all households were made up of individuals, and 7.3% had someone living alone who was 65 years of age or older. The average household size was 2.48 and the average family size was 2.91.

24.6% of the population were under the age of 19, 4.9% from 20 to 24, 28% from 25 to 44, 32.3% from 45 to 64, and 15% who were 65 years of age or older. The median age was 43.5 years. 49.2% identified as male, while 50.8 identified as female.

The median household income was $56,596 and the median family income was $64,101. People identifying as male had a median income of $40,906 and people identifying as female $31,115. In 2018, the per capita income was $32,971, about 8.6% of the population were below the poverty line.

== Communities and locations in Sullivan ==
- Blakeslea – A hamlet in the southeastern corner of the town.
- Bolivar – A hamlet northeast of Chittenango village.
- Bridgeport – A hamlet in the northwest of the town by the town line on NY-31 at Chittenango Creek.
- Chittenango – The village of Chittanango and the location of the town government is in the southern part of the town.
- Chittenango Creek – A stream that forms the northwestern boundary of the town.
- Chittenango Springs – A hamlet south of Chittenango village on Route 13.
- East Boston – A location near the eastern town line.
- Eaton Corners – A location south of Lakeport.
- Fyler Settlement – a hamlet in the northwestern part of the town.
- Gees Corner – A location in the northeastern part of the town.
- Lake Oneida Beach West – A lakeside hamlet on the shore of Oneida Lake.
- Lakeport – A hamlet on Oneida Lake and Route 31.
- Messenger Bay – A lakeside hamlet in the northeastern corner of the town.
- North Chittenango – A hamlet south of the Thruway on Lakeport Road.
- Oneida Lake Beach West – A lakeside hamlet in the northern part of the town. The Oneida Lake Congregational Church was listed on the National Register of Historic Places in 2006.
- Peck Corner – A location in the northwestern part of the town at County Routes 1 and 4.
- Sullivan – A hamlet east of Chittenango village on Route 5 and 13.
- Weaver Corner – A location near Chittenango Creek in the northwestern part of the town.

== Transportation ==
Luther Airport is located one nautical mile (1.85 km) east of the central business district of Chittenango.

== Notable people ==
- Augustus and John Allen, founders of Houston, Texas

== Gallery ==
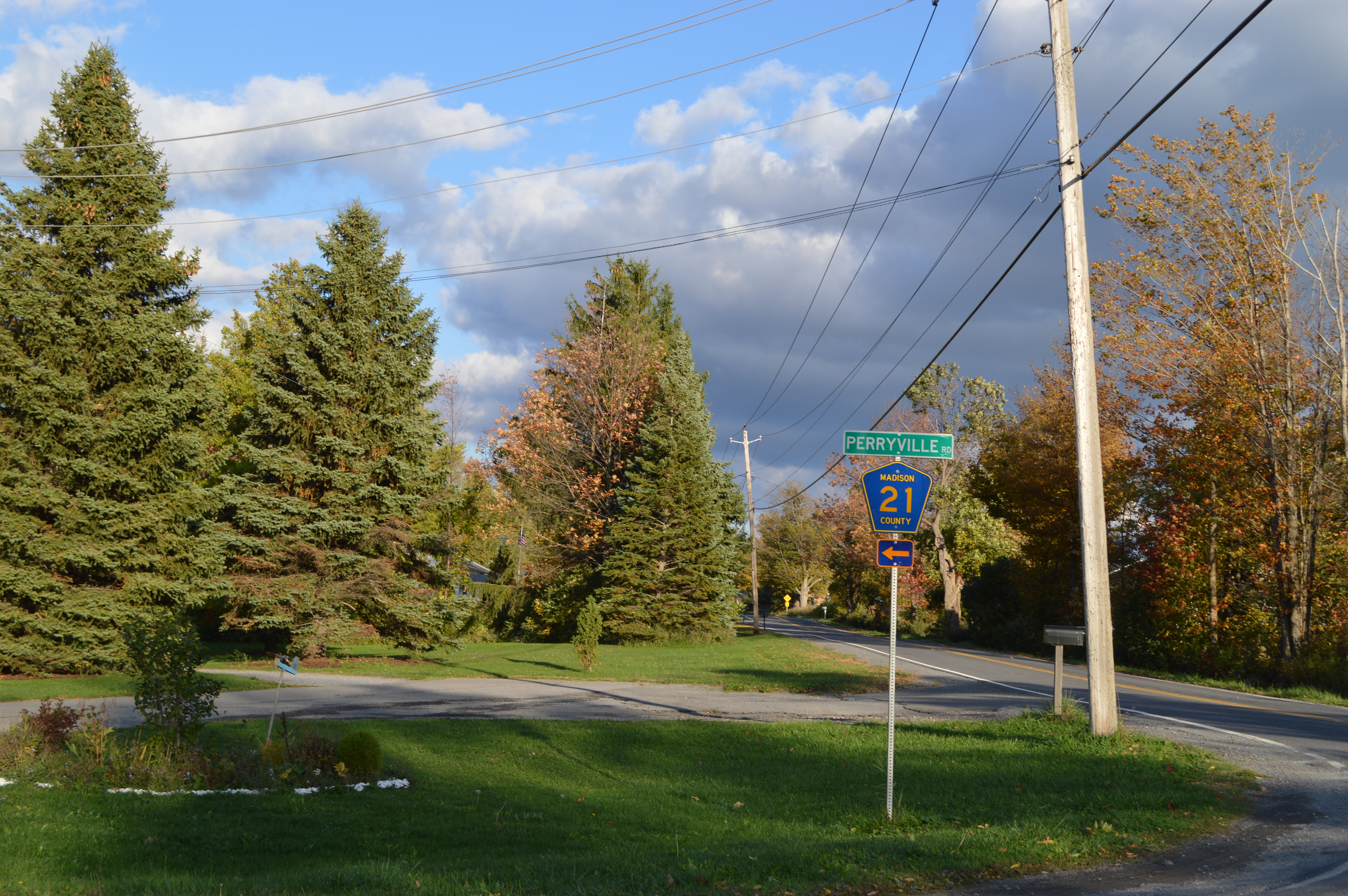

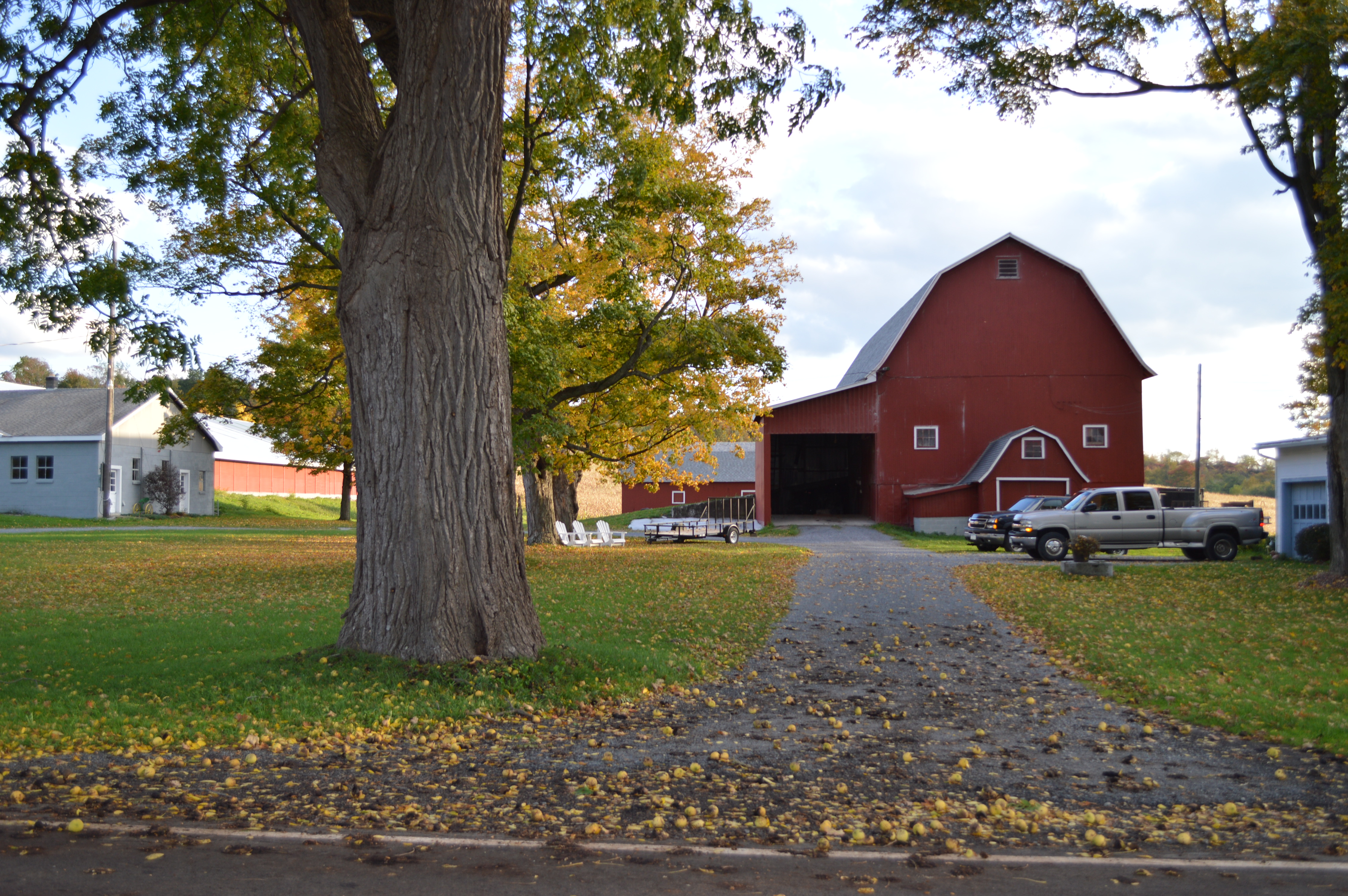

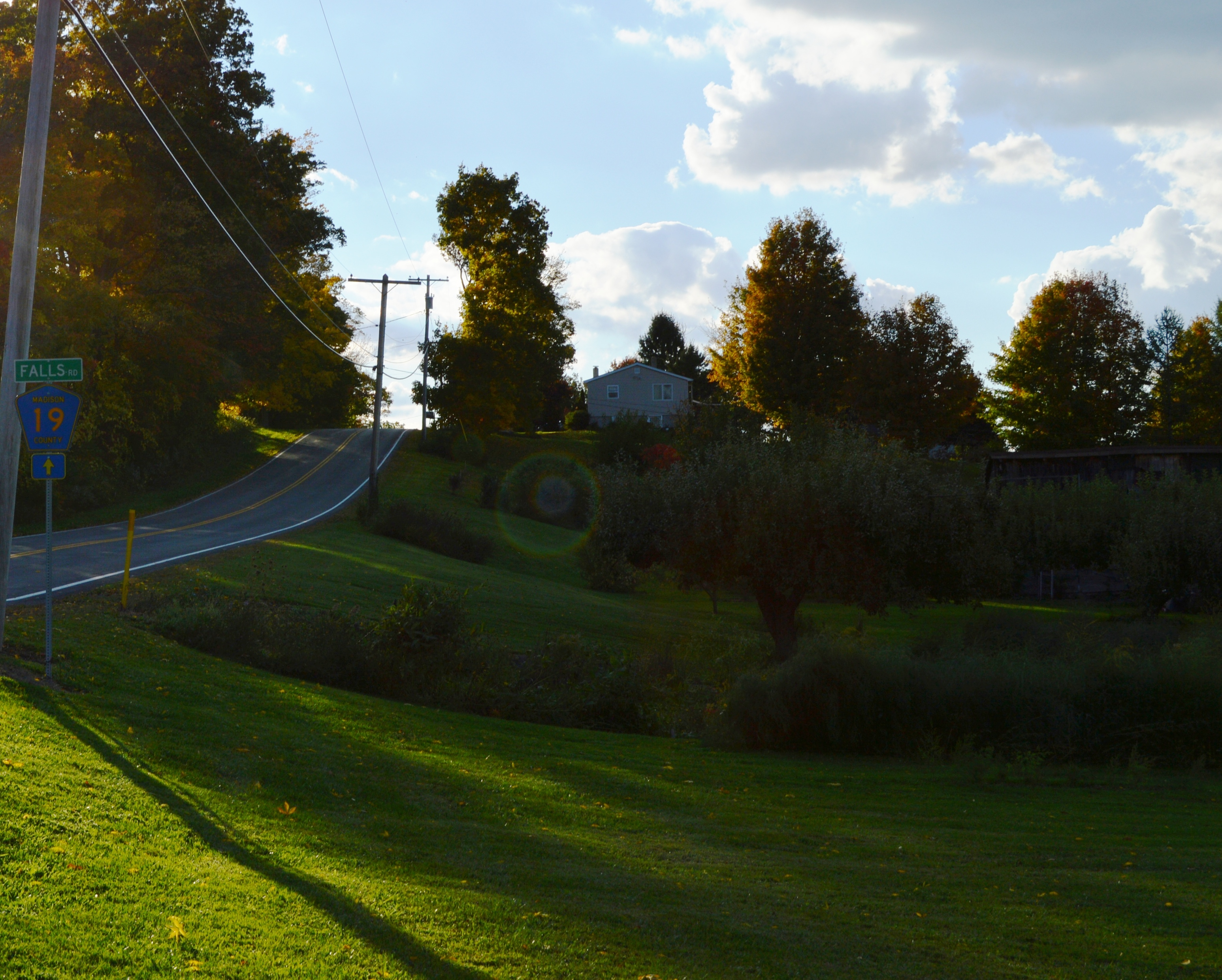

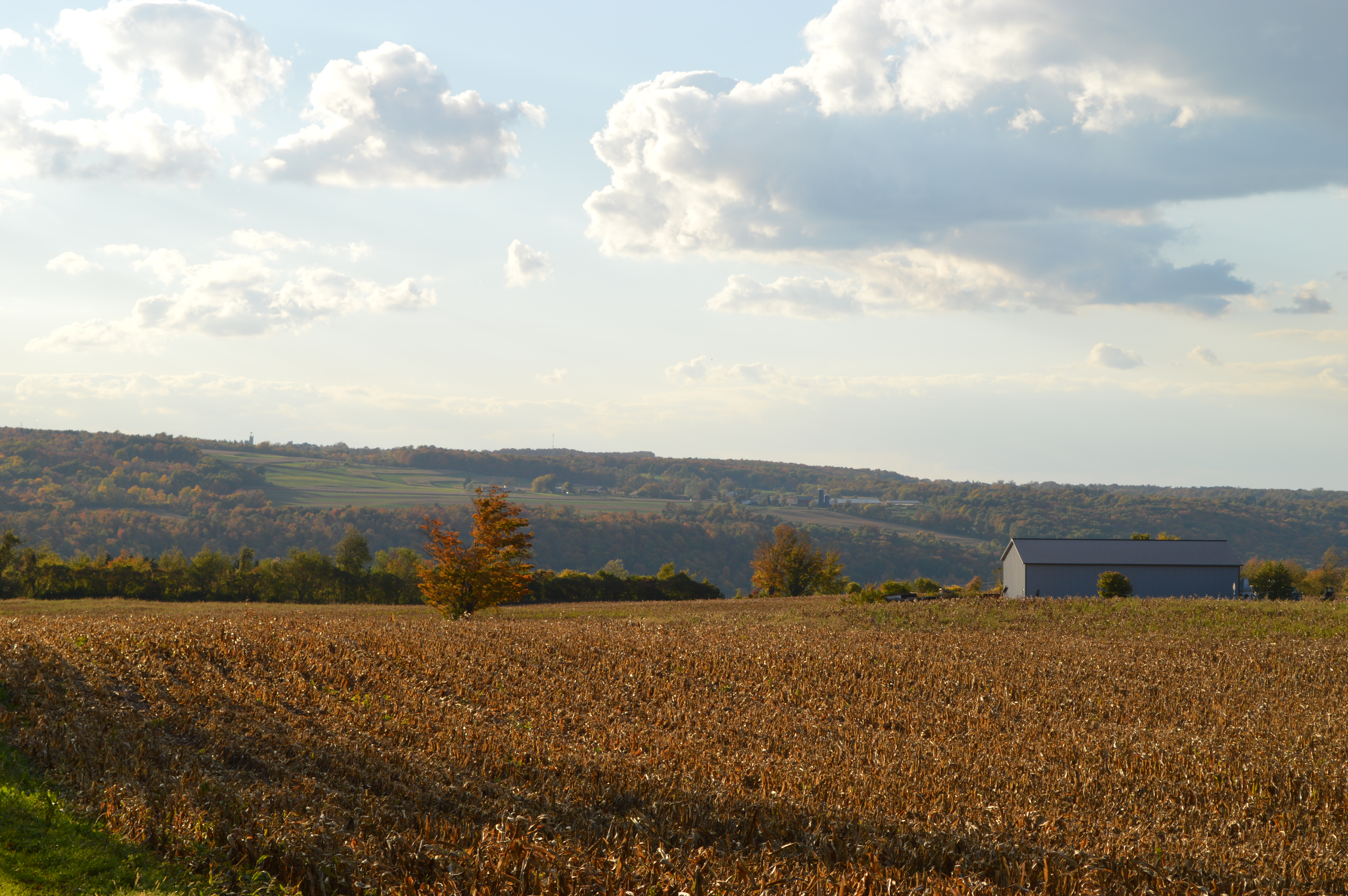

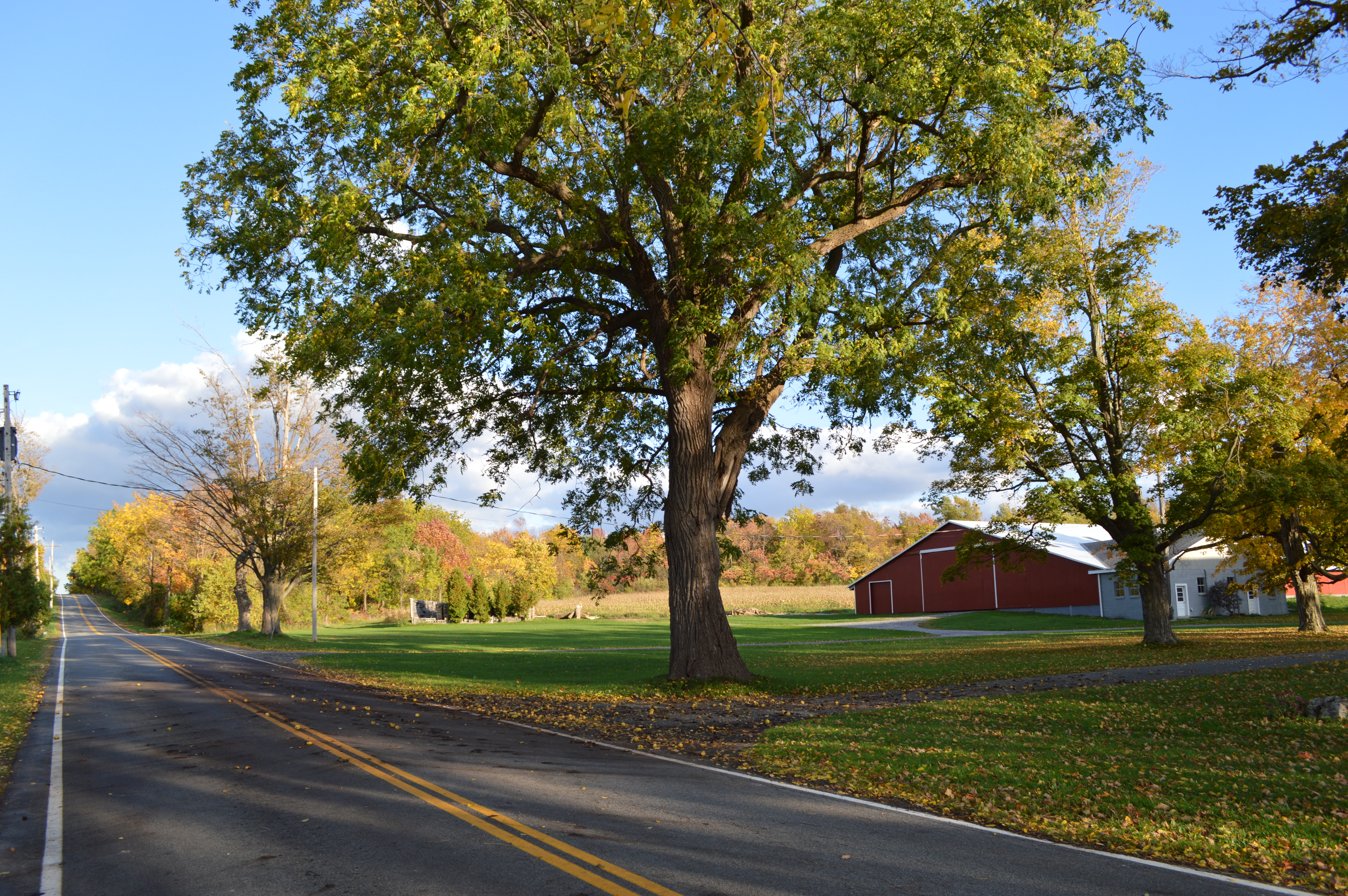

== See also ==
- Old Erie Canal State Historic Park
