= Wild Animal Park (Chittenango) =

- Interactive map of Wild Animal Park
- 43°5′33″N 75°52′32″W
- Date opened: 2010
- Location: Chittenango, New York, United States
- Land area: 14 acres (5.7 ha)
- Owner: Jeff Taylor
- Website: https://thewildpark.com/

The Wild Animal Park is a zoo, safari park, and resort in Chittenango, New York.

== History ==
The zoo was founded by Jeff Taylor in 2010. Taylor had grown up on a dairy farm and designed zoo enclosures in study hall during grade school. He built the zoo over a period of three years.

== Exhibits and attractions ==
The park covers 14 acres and hosts dozens of species. The zoo's enclosures are designed to mimic the habitats of their respective animal, and the facility includes heated shelters for use in winter. Its big cat exhibits include African lions, clouded leopards, Bengal tigers, black jaguars, cheetahs, mountain lions, and African leopards. Its primate exhibit includes white-handed gibbons, siamang apes, baboons, Javan langurs, Geoffroy's spider monkeys, capuchin monkeys, common squirrel monkeys, black bearded sakis, titi monkeys, ring-tailed lemurs, and red ruffed lemurs. The zoo also hosts reptiles, such as African sulcata tortoises, red-footed tortoises, alligators, red-tailed boas, and rattlesnakes, as well as African penguins, plains zebras, antelopes, red kangaroos, dromedary camels, pygmy hippopotamuses, binturongs, warthogs, sika deer, spotted hyenas, crested porcupines, timberwolves, grizzly bears, North American black bears, fishers, American badgers, southern ground hornbills, Eurasian eagle-owls, parakeets, a green-winged macaw and domestic animals, such as pygmy goats, llamas, huacaya alpacas, chickens, east indie ducks, Jacob sheep, and helmeted guinea fowl. The majority of its animals were acquired from other zoos during infancy.

The park hosts programs and events to raise awareness of conservation and encourage interest in wildlife. Visitors are allowed to participate in animal encounters that involve feeding animals like reticulated giraffes, small-clawed otters, two-toed sloths, penguins, capybaras, camels and pygmy goats.

The zoo participates in breeding programs and Species Survival Plans for endangered species. Several animals were born at the zoo in 2017, including a jaguar cub, two zebras, lemurs, and a binturong. On October 25, 2021, a giraffe named Jahzara was born at the zoo. It is the first giraffe born in Central New York. A second giraffe named Jabari was born on June 24, 2023. The name Jabari means "the fearless one" in Swahili and was chosen by a contest held on Facebook and Instagram.

=== Safari park ===
The park opened a drive-thru safari park in 2020 in order to continue operating during the COVID-19 pandemic when social distancing disrupted its operations. Several species of animals, including plains zebras, ostriches, emus, greater rheas, chickens, scimitar-horned oryx, gazelles, nilgai, blue wildebeests, watusi, water buffalo, plains bison, Barbary sheep, European fallow deer, Roosevelt elk, domestic cattle, donkeys, llamas, alpacas, southern white rhinoceroses, and tigers are present in the safari park.

=== The Haven of the Wild ===
In 2022, a $10 million expansion to the park was announced. The planned expansions included a wedding venue and resort, as well as luxury camping accommodations in the safari park. The project was initially delayed while the park awaited permits, and construction began in 2023.

The Haven of the Wild resort was opened in early 2025, with a series of bungalows overlooking the lion and tiger enclosures, as well as a wedding and event center. The campground in the safari park is scheduled to open later in 2025.

=== Mayan Exhibit ===
A Mayan temple exhibit was finished in October 2023, and houses their New World monkeys, jaguars, giant anteaters, ratels, blue and gold macaws, and king vultures.

=== Concert venue ===
A concert venue was built at the park in 2025. The first concert, headlined by country pop singer Ashley Cooke, is scheduled to take place on July 26, 2025.

== Gallery ==
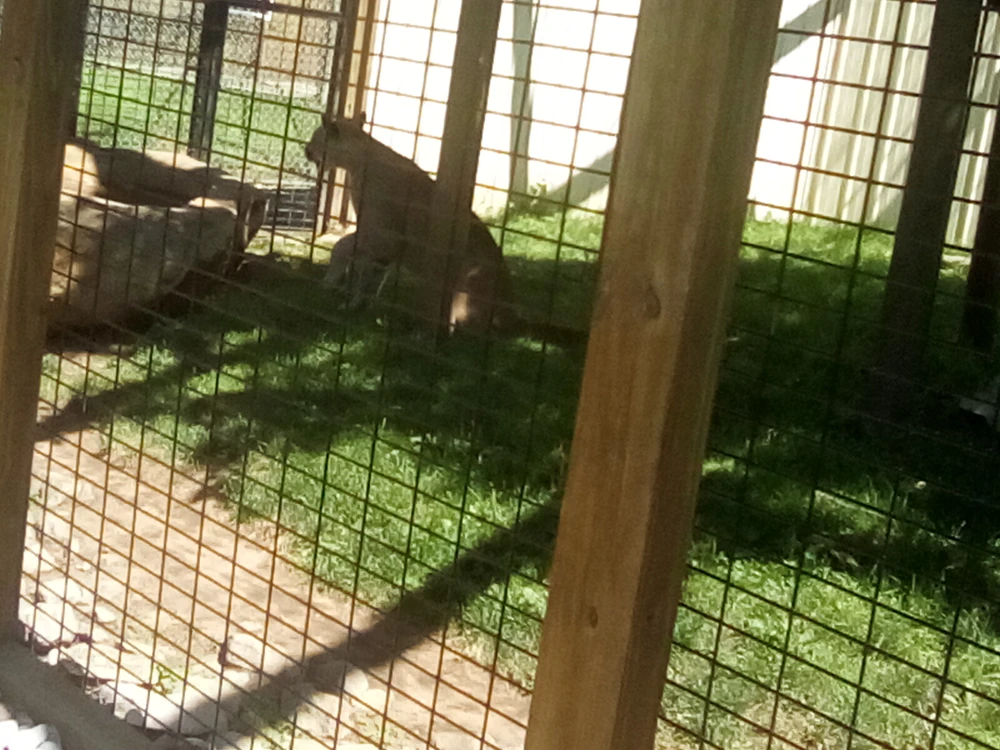
North American cougar

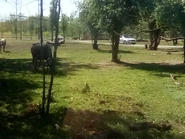
Blue wildebeest

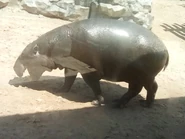
Pygmy hippopotamus

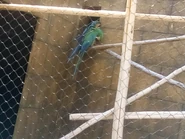
Blue and gold macaw

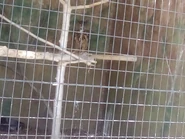
Eurasian eagle-owl

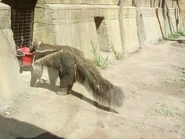
Giant anteater

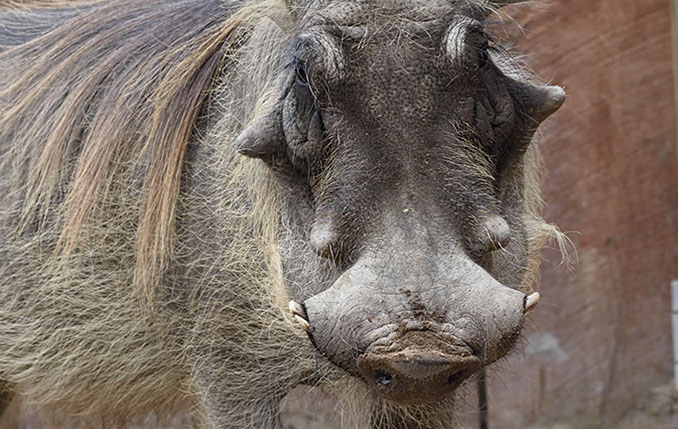
Common warthog

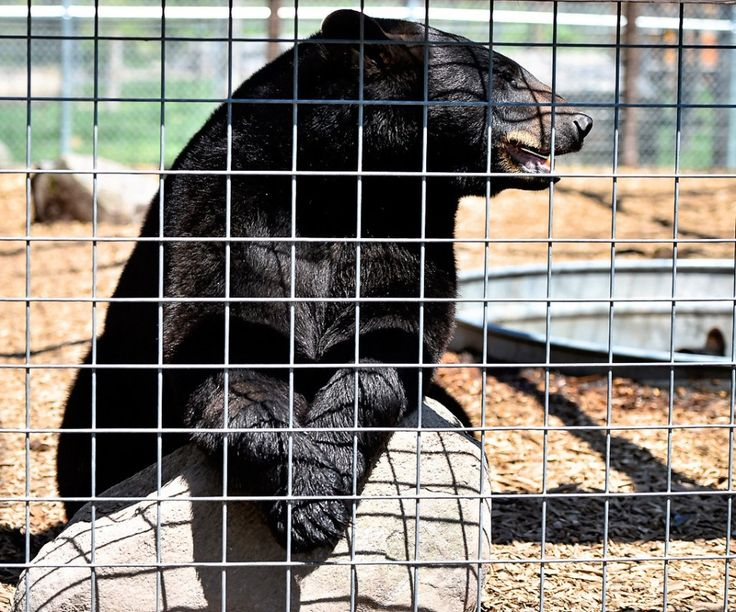
American black bear in enclosure
