= Bridgeport, New York =

- Census-designated place
- Location within New York Location within the United States
- Coordinates: 43°9′16″N 75°58′30″W
- Country: United States
- State: New York
- Counties: Onondaga, Madison
- Towns: Cicero, Sullivan

Area
  - Total: 1.94 sq mi (5.03 km^{2})
  - Land: 1.93 sq mi (4.99 km^{2})
  - Water: 0.015 sq mi (0.04 km^{2})
- Elevation: 390 ft (119 m)

Population (2020)
  - Total: 1,389
  - Density: 720.7/sq mi (278.28/km^{2})
- Time zone: UTC-5 (Eastern (EST))
  - Summer (DST): UTC-4 (EDT)
- ZIP Codes: 13030 (Bridgeport); 13082 (Kirkville)
- Area code: 315
- FIPS code: 36-08147
- GNIS feature ID: 0944727

Bridgeport is a hamlet (and census-designated place) in upstate New York, United States, located partly in the town of Sullivan in Madison County, and partly in the town of Cicero in Onondaga County. The population was 1,389 as of the 2020 census, down from 1,490 in 2010.

== Geography ==
Bridgeport is located in northwestern Madison County and northeastern Onondaga County at 43°9′16″N 75°58′30″W (43.154472, -75.974888). It straddles the northward-flowing Chittenango Creek, which serves as the boundary between Onondaga County's town of Cicero on the west side of the creek and Madison County's town of Sullivan on the east side of the creek. The hamlet's namesake bridge spans the creek, which empties into Oneida Lake 2.25 linear miles approximately north of the bridge. There is no other bridge across Chittenango Creek north of Bridgeport, nor one within several linear miles to the south.

New York State Route 31 is an east–west highway through the community (the bridge over Chittenango Creek is on Route 31); it leads east 20 miles (32 km) to Verona and west 176 miles (283 km) to Niagara Falls. The north end of New York State Route 298 is at Route 31 in the hamlet, just west of Chittenango Creek. Syracuse is 13 miles (21 km) to the southwest via Route 298.

According to the U.S. Census Bureau, the Bridgeport CDP has an area of 1.94 square miles (5.02 km^{2}), of which 0.02 square miles (0.05 km^{2}), or 0.77%, are water.

== Demographics ==
Historical population
Census	Pop.	Note	%±
2000	1,678		—
2010	1,490		−11.2%
2020	1,389		−6.8%
U.S. Decennial Census

As of the census of 2000, there were 1,678 people, 639 households, and 431 families residing in the hamlet. The population density was 912.4 inhabitants per square mile (352.3/km^{2}). There were 685 housing units at an average density of 375.4 per square mile (144.9/km^{2}). The racial makeup of the area was 96.10% White, 1.20% African American, 0.66% Native American, 0.42% Asian, and 1.62% from two or more races. Hispanic or Latino of any race were 0.36% of the population.

There were 639 households, out of which 32.4% had children under the age of 18 living with them, 51.5% were married couples living together, 11.9% had a female householder with no husband present, and 32.4% were non-families. 26.6% of all households were made up of individuals, and 14.7% had someone living alone who was 65 years of age or older. The average household size was 2.60 and the average family size was 3.13.

In the community, the population was spread out, with 25.8% under the age of 18, 8.8% from 18 to 24, 30.0% from 25 to 44, 21.7% from 45 to 64, and 13.8% who were 65 years of age or older. The median age was 38 years. For every 100 females, there were 98.7 males. For every 100 females age 18 and over, there were 93.1 males.

The median income for a household in the community was $31,358, and the median income for a family was $42,337. Males had a median income of $26,970 versus $26,316 for females. The per capita income for the CDP was $14,761. About 10.5% of families and 12.2% of the population were below the poverty line, including 19.9% of those under age 18 and 7.5% of those age 65 or over.

== Notable people ==
- Maude B. Perkins (1874-1932), educator and temperance reformer
