= James Collinsworth =

American judge

1st Chief Justice of Texas
- In office December 16, 1836 – July 11, 1838
- Preceded by: Inaugural holder
- Succeeded by: John Birdsall

Senator from Brazoria District
- In office November 30, 1836 – December 16, 1836
- Preceded by: Inaugural holder
- Succeeded by: William Green Hill

Secretary of State of Texas
- Acting; April 29, 1836 – May 23, 1836
- Preceded by: Samuel Price Carson
- Succeeded by: William Houston Jack

Delegate to the Convention of 1836 from Brazoria District
- In office February 1, 1836 – March 17, 1836

United States Attorney for the Western District of Tennessee
- In office 1829–1835
- Preceded by: Thomas H. Fletcher
- Succeeded by: William T. Brown

Personal details
- Born: 1802 Davidson County, Tennessee, U.S.
- Died: July 11, 1838 (aged 35–36) Galveston, Republic of Texas
- Resting place: Founders Memorial Cemetery

James Thompson Collinsworth (1802 – July 11, 1838) was an American-born Texan lawyer and politician prominent in early history of the Republic of Texas.

== Early life ==
Collinsworth was born in Davidson County, Tennessee in 1802. His father, Edward Collinsworth, served in the American Revolutionary War and the War of 1812. His sister, Susan, married Mark R. Cockrill, a large planter known as the "Wool King of the World".

== Career ==
Collinsworth served as the United States Attorney for the Western District of Tennessee.

Collinsworth served as a signer of the Texas Declaration of Independence, the first chief justice of the Supreme Court of the Republic of Texas, and as the acting Secretary of State of Texas.

Collinsworth was a candidate during the 1838 Republic of Texas presidential election against Mirabeau B. Lamar.

== Death and legacy ==
On July 11, 1838, just days after his Presidential Campaign was reported, Collinsworth drowned after falling from a steamboat into Galveston Bay. It is usually suspected that he committed suicide. His body was found on Bolivar Peninsula and taken by boat upstream along Buffalo Bayou to Houston, where he lay in state at the Texas Capitol. He was interred at Founders Memorial Cemetery in Houston.

Collingsworth County, Texas and Collingsworth Street in Houston, were both posthumously named in his honor, even though both were misspelled.
