= Adele Briscoe Looscan =

American preservationist

Adele B. Looscan
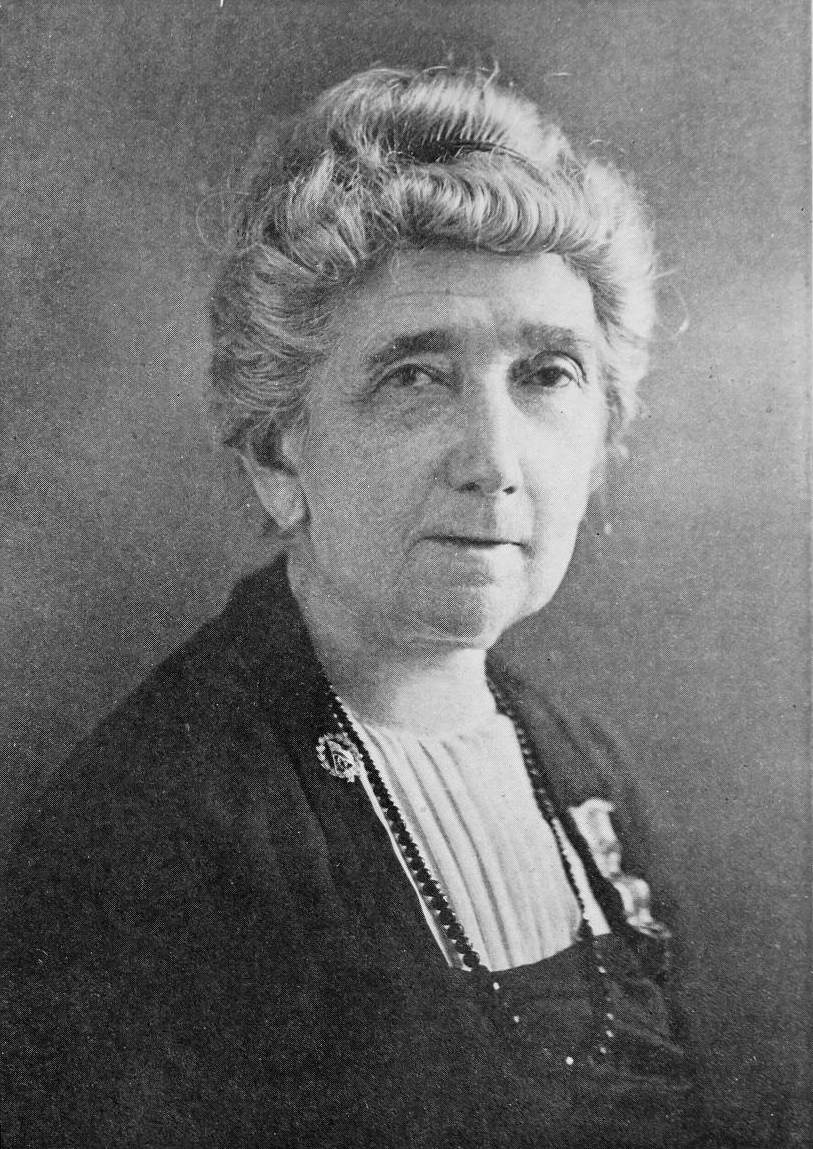
- Born: Adele Lubbock Briscoe; February 5, 1848; Harrisburg, Texas, United States
- Died: November 23, 1935 (aged 87); Galveston, Texas
- Spouse: Michael Looscan
- Parent(s): Andrew Briscoe, Mary Jane (Harris) Briscoe

Adele Lubbock Briscoe Looscan (February 5, 1848 – November 23, 1935) was an American club organizer, writer, and historical preservationist from Harris County, Texas. She was president of the Texas State Historical Association (1915–1925).

== Early life ==
Adele Lubbock Briscoe on 5 February 1848. Her father was Andrew Briscoe, signer of the Texas Declaration of Independence and the first Chief Justice of Harris County. Her mother, Mary Jane (Harris) Briscoe, descended from an early settler and namesake of Harris County, John Richardson Harris. He also founded Harrisburg, Texas, which was taken over and overseen by her grandmother, Jane Birdsall Briscoe. She was named for one of her country neighbors, Adele Lubbock, the wife of Harris County Clerk and future Texas Governor, Francis Richard Lubbock.

Adele's father died when she was less than two-years old. The family moved to Mississippi to live with her paternal grandfather, General Parmenas Briscoe. After his death in 1851, Mary Jane Briscoe lost their residence in Mississippi and moved to Anderson, Texas, in 1852. Seven years later she returned with her family to her hometown of Harrisburg, Texas. With the school at Harrisburg closed, Adele attended Miss Browne's School for Young Ladies (Houston) from 1861, where she graduated as valedictorian in 1866.

Adele married Major Michael Looscan on September 13, 1881.

== Clubs and preservation ==
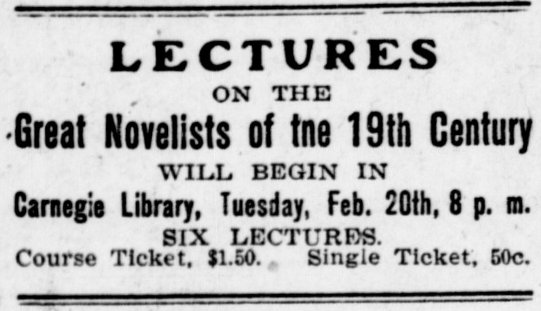
Advertisement for event at Carnegie Library, Houston, Texas, 20 February 1906.

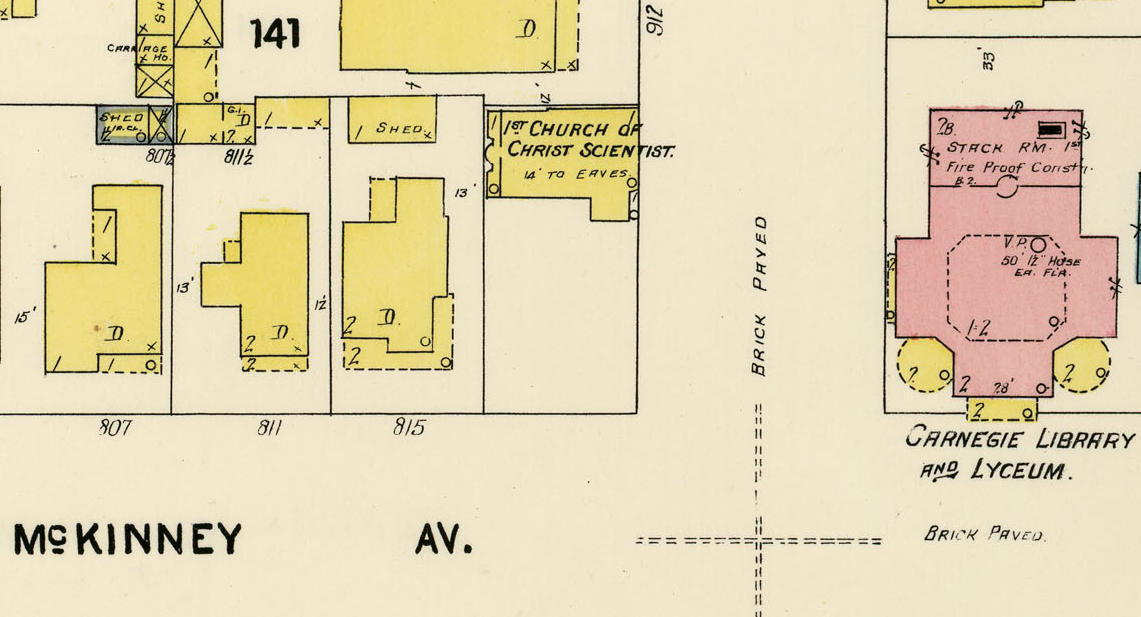
1907 Sanborn Map with Carnegie Library and Houston Lyceum

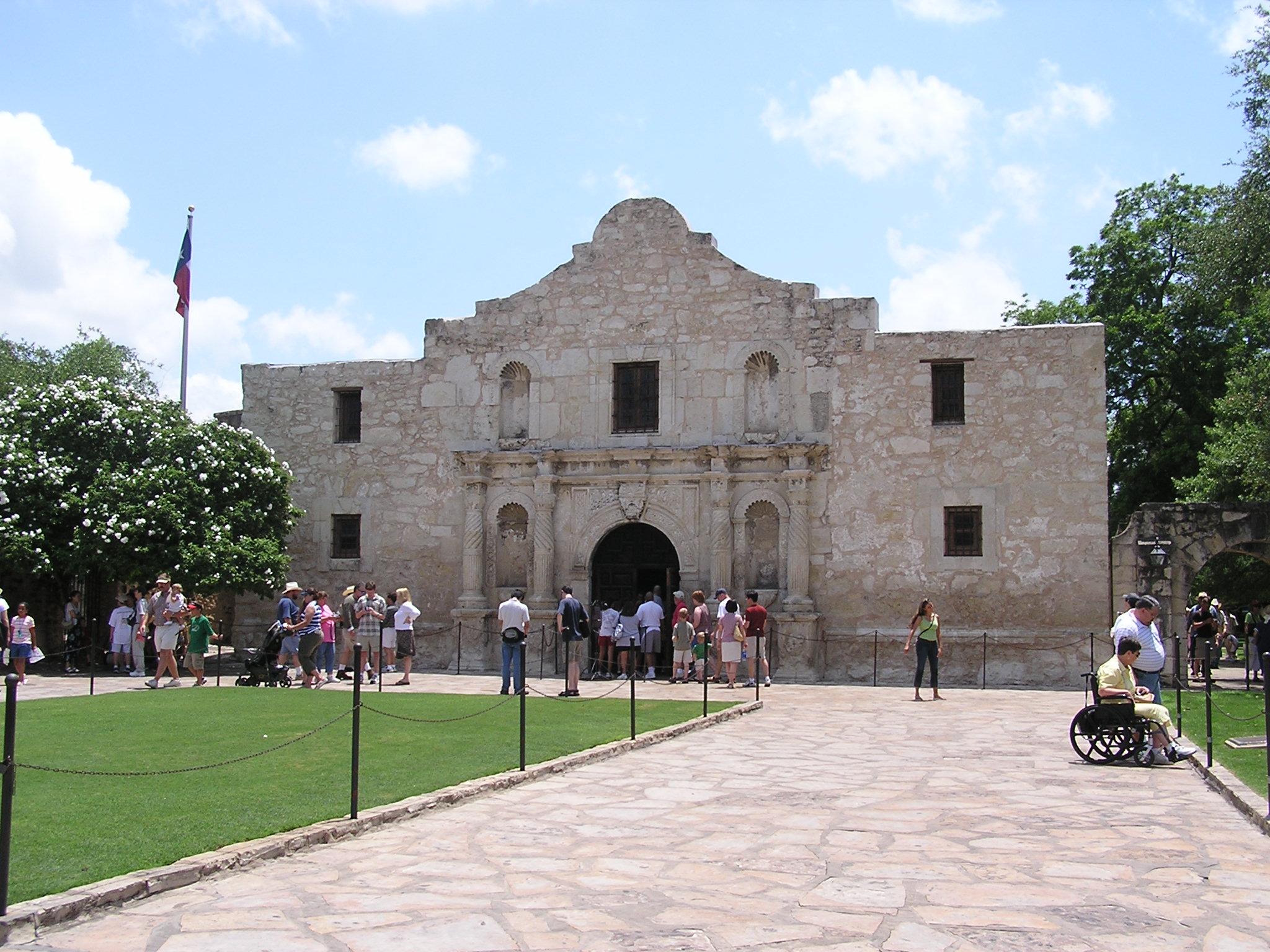
The Alamo, San Antonio, Texas

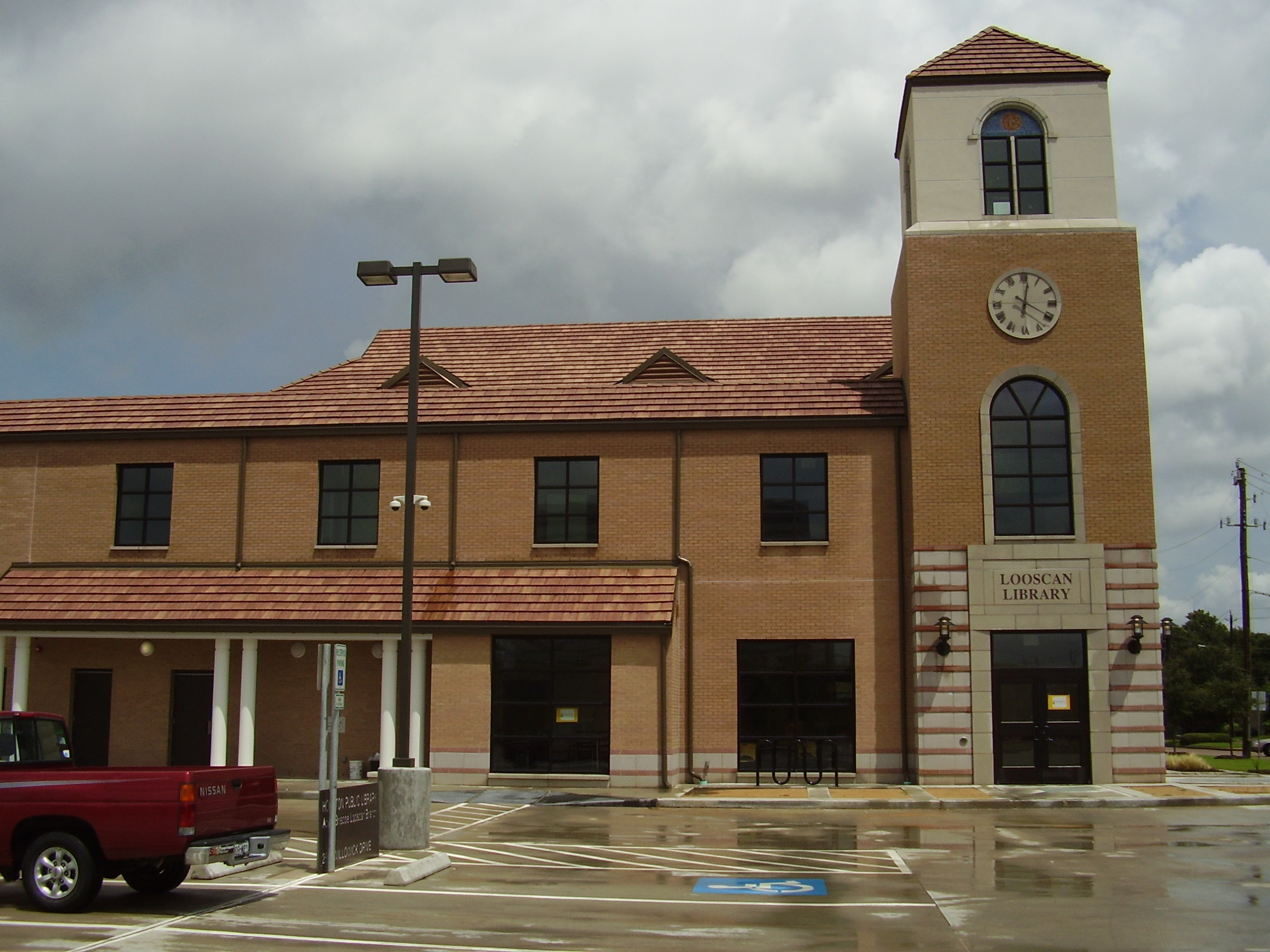
Looscan Neighborhood Library in Houston.

In February 1885, Looscan started a club at her mother's home in Houston to promote "intellectual and social culture." A few months later her club had attracted thirty-five members, and become known as the Ladies' Reading Club. Members collaborated in collecting periodicals and books to create a club library. By 1900, Looscan organized a coalition of local clubs to form the City Federation of Woman's Clubs, which sponsored social events and raised money to buy a lot in Houston. The club's land purchase, combined with city of Houston and Carnegie grants, culminated in the opening of Houston's first public library on March 2, 1904.

Looscan and her mother hosted meetings to establish the Daughters of the Lone Star Republic (DRT) in 1891. She poured her energy into recruitment for new members. She met resistance from many prospects, but persuaded Adina De Zavala, a granddaughter of the first Vice-President of Texas. Looscan published writings in major Texas newspapers and some Texas literary magazines. Most famously, she published her mother's memoir of the "First Anniversary Ball of the Battle of San Jacinto." She wrote frequently about Texas history, but also submitted essays about education and gender issues. Her works caught the attention of Dora Fowler Arthur, editor of Texas Magazine, who offered column space to the DRT in 1896. She wrote articles for Dudley G. Wooten's Comprehensive History of Texas and for his New History of Texas for Schools. Looscan was a charter member of the Texas State Historical Association, the Houston Pen Women, and the Texas Woman's Press Association.

Looscan was a combatant in a schism within the DRT about the Alamo site in San Antonio. De Zavala, who had established an eponymous chapter of the DRT, was adamant about historical restoration and preservation. Looscan supported De Zavala and her principles. Clara Driscoll advocated remaking the site as an urban park. The acrimony of the debate resulted in Looscan withdrawing from the DRT. The Texas State Historical Association (TSHA), organized in 1897, recruited Looscan and other writers from the women's clubs and trained them for scholarly historical writing. After the Alamo dispute, Looscan and De Zavala remained engaged with the TSHA, though many other women dropped out in reaction to the Alamo dispute. Looscan continued to write and recruit other writers for the TSHA. In 1915, Eugene C. Barker appointed Looscan to serve as president of the Texas State Historical Commission. She promoted TSHA's magazine, with a focus on Houston as a base of expansion, approaching Rice Institute and various women's clubs. Looscan resigned as president of TSHA in 1925, but remained active in the Association for the Preservation of the Historical Landmarks in Texas and the United Daughters of the Confederacy.

== Death and legacy ==
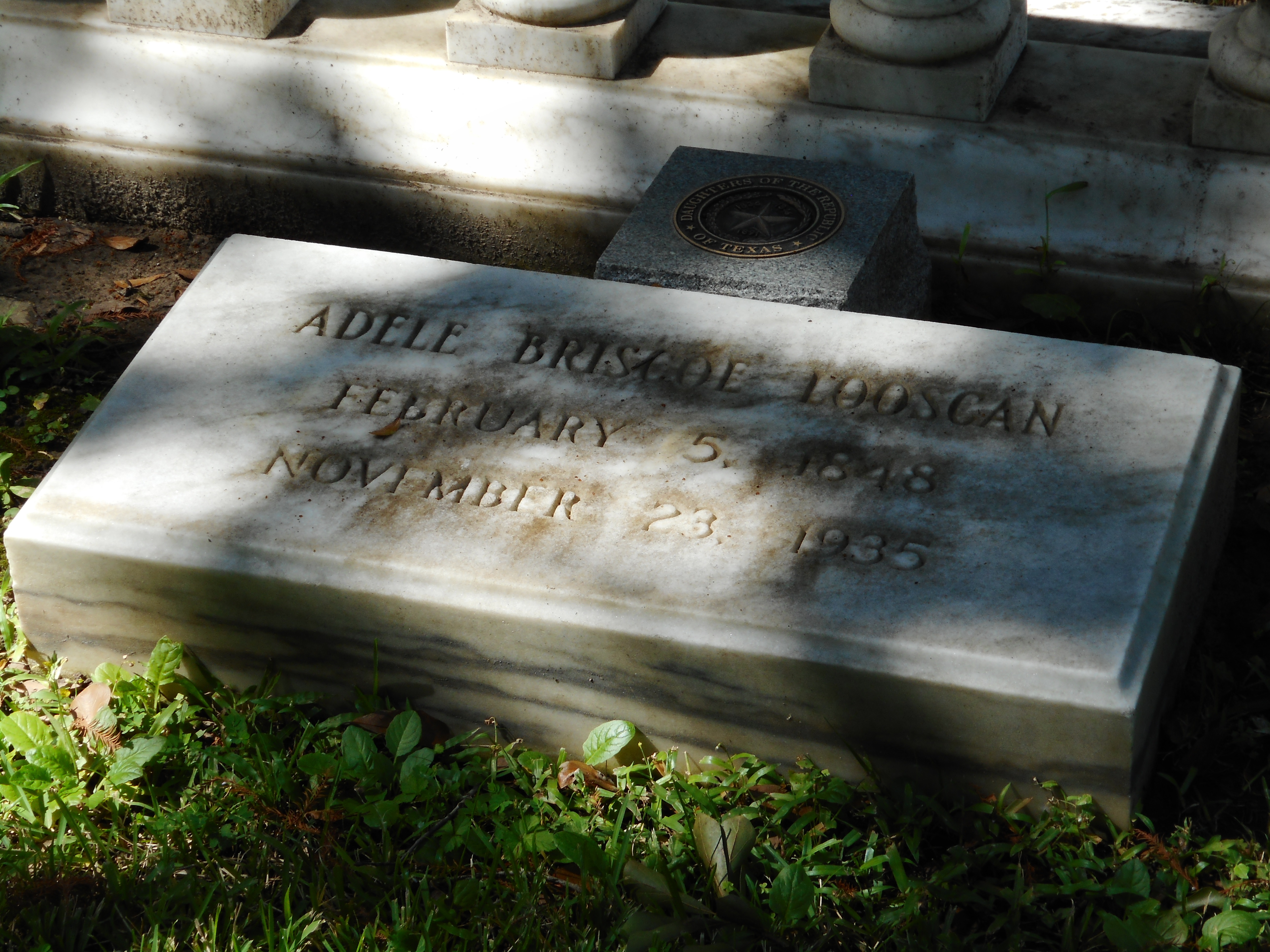
Grave marker for Adele Briscoe Looscan, Glenwood Cemetery, Houston.

Looscan died in Houston on November 23, 1935, and was interred at Glenwood Cemetery. She donated an extensive collection of Texas history books to the Houston Public Library and the Looscan Neighborhood Library in Houston is named in her honor.

== Selected works ==
- Heroes of Texas: Micajah Autry, a soldier of the Alamo, 191
- A brief sketch of the life and characteristics of Mrs. Mary Jane Briscoe : showing the estimation in which she was held by her friends and the public generally, 1903
- Harris County, Texas 1822-1845, 1915
- The pioneer Harrises of Harris County, Texas, 1928
- The Work of the Daughters of the Republic of Texas in Behalf of the Alamo, 1904
- The old fort at Anahuac, 1899
