= Dodson tri-color flag =

Former flag of the Texas Revolution

Dodson flag
- The Dodson flag; note its elongated proportions.
- Proportion: unknown (Possibly 1:3)
- Adopted: 1835
- Design: A tricolor (in order) of blue, white, and red, of the French flag with elongated proportions. One five-pointed, white star ("Texas Lone Star") in the center of the blue field of the flag.
- Designed by: Sarah (Rudolph Bradley) Dodson

An improper variation of the Dodson flag from an account by Mr. Dodson, deriving from a publication by Mrs. Adele Briscoe Looscan in 1896; note swapped tricolor bands.

The Dodson tri-color (tricolor, tricolour, or tricolore) flag, more commonly the Dodson flag, or Dodson's flag, is a flag originally created by Mrs. Sarah Dodson for Captain Andrew Robinson's Harrisburg Company (of Texas Volunteers) in the Texas Revolution, where her husband, Archelaus Dodson, was enlisted. Constructed in 1835, the Dodson flag served as a symbol of the company in the midst of the revolution, having been flown on their march from the former, Harrisburg, Texas, to Gonzales, and later, possibly with a different company, over Cibolo Creek. Assuming command soon after, Stephen F. Austin repurposed the flag, later flying in San Antonio for the December portion of the Siege of San Antonio de Béxar (Siege of San Antonio). In 1836, the Dodson flag, among two others, flew over the Alamo Mission for the Battle of the Alamo. Furthermore, in 1836, Dodson's flag was allegedly commissioned over the meeting hall at Washington-on-the-Brazos, where the Convention of 1836 met, later leading to the creation of the Texas Declaration of Independence. If this theory is true, it may have been the flag proposed by politician, Lorenzo de Zavala, for the Texas national flag.

Another variation of the Dodson flag (with improper proportions); described by Charles E. Gilbert in A Concise History of Early Texas: As told by its 30 historic flags.

Following Mrs. Dodson's death in 1848 as a result of pneumonia, the flag became a key symbol of the Texas Revolution. Her grave, left unmarked, gave way to a cemetery until 1935 when it was eventually commemorated with a pink tombstone (made of granite) by her descendants in response to a centennial via the Bedias, Texas community.

The Dodson tri-color flag may have also flown at the Battle of Concepción: the opening engagement of the Siege (and Battle) of San Antonio de Béxar in modern-day San Antonio, Texas.

== Design specifications ==
The Dodson flag consists of a blue, white and red tricolor, ensigned with a five-pointed white star ("Texas Lone Star") in the center of the blue field. The flag, resembling the flag of France but with longer proportions not specified, was frowned upon by Stephen F. Austin in response to its obvious symbolism. The original flag was made of calico.
