= Jane Harris =

Jane Harris may refer to:

- Jane Harris (producer), British television director and producer
- Jane Harris (writer) (born 1961), British writer of fiction and screenplays
- Jane Harris (Neighbours), a fictional character in the Australian soap opera Neighbours
- Jane Elizabeth Harris (c. 1853–1942), New Zealand writer, lecturer and spiritualist
- Jane Harris (artist) (1956–2022), British artist
- Jane Birdsall Harris (1791–1869), pioneer in Harris County, Texas

== See also ==
- Jana Harris (born 1947), American poet, novelist, essayist, and journal founder
