= Flag of Texas =

U.S. state flag

State of Texas
- The Lone Star Flag
- Use: Civil and state flag
- Proportion: 2:3
- Adopted: January 25, 1839 (by the Republic of Texas); Readopted: August 31, 1933; (de facto use 1879–1933)
- Design: One-third of the hoist is blue containing a single centered white star. The remaining field is divided horizontally into a white and red bar.
- Designed by: Unknown

The flag of Texas, also known as the Lone Star Flag, (Note: This lone star, in turn, gives rise to the state's nickname, "The Lone Star State".) is the official flag of the U.S. state of Texas. Along with the flag of Hawaii, it is one of two state flags to have previously served as a national flag of an independent country.

The actual designer of the flag is unknown. Some historians and the Texas Legislature in 1989 claim that Charles B. Stewart of Montgomery, Texas, is either the designer of the flag or drew the image used by the Third Congress when enacting the legislation adopting the flag. In 2001, the North American Vexillological Association surveyed its members on the designs of the 72 U.S. state, territorial, and Canadian provincial flags and ranked the Texas flag second, behind New Mexico.

== Design and specifications ==
The state flag is officially described by law as:

a rectangle that: (1) has a width to length ratio of two to three; and (2) contains: (A) one blue vertical stripe that has a width equal to one-third the length of the flag; (B) two equal horizontal stripes, the upper stripe white, the lower stripe red, each having a length equal to two-thirds the length of the flag; and (C) one white, regular five-pointed star: (i) located in the center of the blue stripe; (ii) oriented so that one point faces upward; and (iii) sized so that the diameter of a circle passing through the five points of the star is equal to three-fourths the width of the blue stripe.

In 2001, the Texas Legislature specified that the colors of the Texas flag should be "(1) the same colors used in the United States flag; and (2) defined as numbers 193 (red) and 281 (dark blue) of the Pantone Matching System."

Color	Cable color	Pantone	Web color	RGB Values
Red	70180	193 C	#BF0A30	(191,10,48)
White	70001	Safe	#FFFFFF	(255,255,255)
Dark Blue	70075	281 C	#00205B	(0,32,91)

== Symbolism ==
The Texas Flag Code assigns the following symbolism to the colors of the Texas flag: blue stands for loyalty, white for purity, and red for bravery. The code also states that the single (lone) star "represents ALL of Texas and stands for our unity as one for God, State, and Country".

The idea of the single red stripe and single white stripe dates back to the short-lived Republic of Fredonia, a small state near modern Nacogdoches that seceded from Mexico in 1826 before being forcibly reintegrated. The new state was formed through an alliance between local Anglo settlers and several Native American tribes, and the Fredonian flag used a red and white stripe to symbolize the unity between these groups. Though this rebellion ultimately failed it served as an inspiration to the later Texas Revolution.

The idea of the "lone star" is, in fact, an older symbol antedating the flag that was used to symbolize Texans' solidarity in declaring independence from Mexico. A similar lone star was on the "Burnet Flag", which resembled the flag of the short-lived Republic of West Florida. The "Lone Star" is still seen today as a symbol of Texas' independent spirit and gave rise to the state's official nickname "the Lone Star State".

== History ==
Legislation authorizing the flag was introduced in the Congress of the Republic of Texas on December 28, 1838, by Senator William H. Wharton. The flag was adopted on January 25, 1839, as the national flag of the Republic of Texas. "Accompanying the original Act ... is a drawing by Peter Krag of the national flag and seal ... although in the original President Lamar's approval and signature are at the top and upside down[.]" When Texas became the 28th U.S. state on December 29, 1845, the national flag became the state flag. From 1879 until 1933, no flag was the official state flag, although the Lone Star Flag remained the de facto one; in adopting the Revised Civil Statutes of 1879, the Legislature repealed all statutes not expressly continued in force; since the statutes pertaining to the flag were not among those renewed, Texas was formally flagless until the passage of the 1933 flag law.

Flag of Chile (since 1817), sometimes mistaken for the Flag of Texas

Texas's flag is similar to the flag of Chile, first used in 1817. However, the Chilean flag has a blue canton with a white star rather than the entire left side being blue, with the red bottom stripe beginning below the canton. Like the Texas Flag, the Chilean flag is known in Spanish as "La Estrella Solitaria" which also means "The Lone Star". One author suggests that both the Chilean flag and the Texas flag were designed to look like the flag of the United States from afar while at sea.

== Protocol ==
Proper vertical display of the Texas flag

The pledge of allegiance to the state flag is as follows:

Honor the Texas flag; I pledge allegiance to thee, Texas, one state under God, one and indivisible.

The pledge was instituted by the Texas Legislature in 1933. The pledge originally referred to the "Texas flag of 1836" (which was the Burnet Flag, and not the Lone Star Flag then in use). In 1965, the error was corrected by deleting the words "of 1836" because the current flag was not officially adopted by the Texas government until 1839. In 2007, the phrase "one state under God" was added. The addition of "under God" has been challenged in court, though an injunction was denied. As of 2001 (amended 2017), the pledge is recited standing at attention with one's right hand over one's heart. A person in uniform instead renders a military salute. The Texas Pledge is always recited after reciting the Pledge of Allegiance to the American flag every morning in the majority of schools across the state.

The flag is required by law to be displayed on or near the main administration building of each state institution during each state or national holiday, and on any special occasion of historical significance, permanently above both doors of the Texas State Capitol, alone at the north door, and under the U.S. flag at the south door, with the exception being if the flags are at half mast or if the POW/MIA flag is being flown with the U.S. flag; in which event the Texas flag shall only fly at the North Door. State law also requires that the state flag be flown at or near any International Port of Entry. When displayed vertically, the blue stripe should be at top, and from the perspective of an observer, the white stripe should be to the left of the red stripe.

=== Urban legend ===
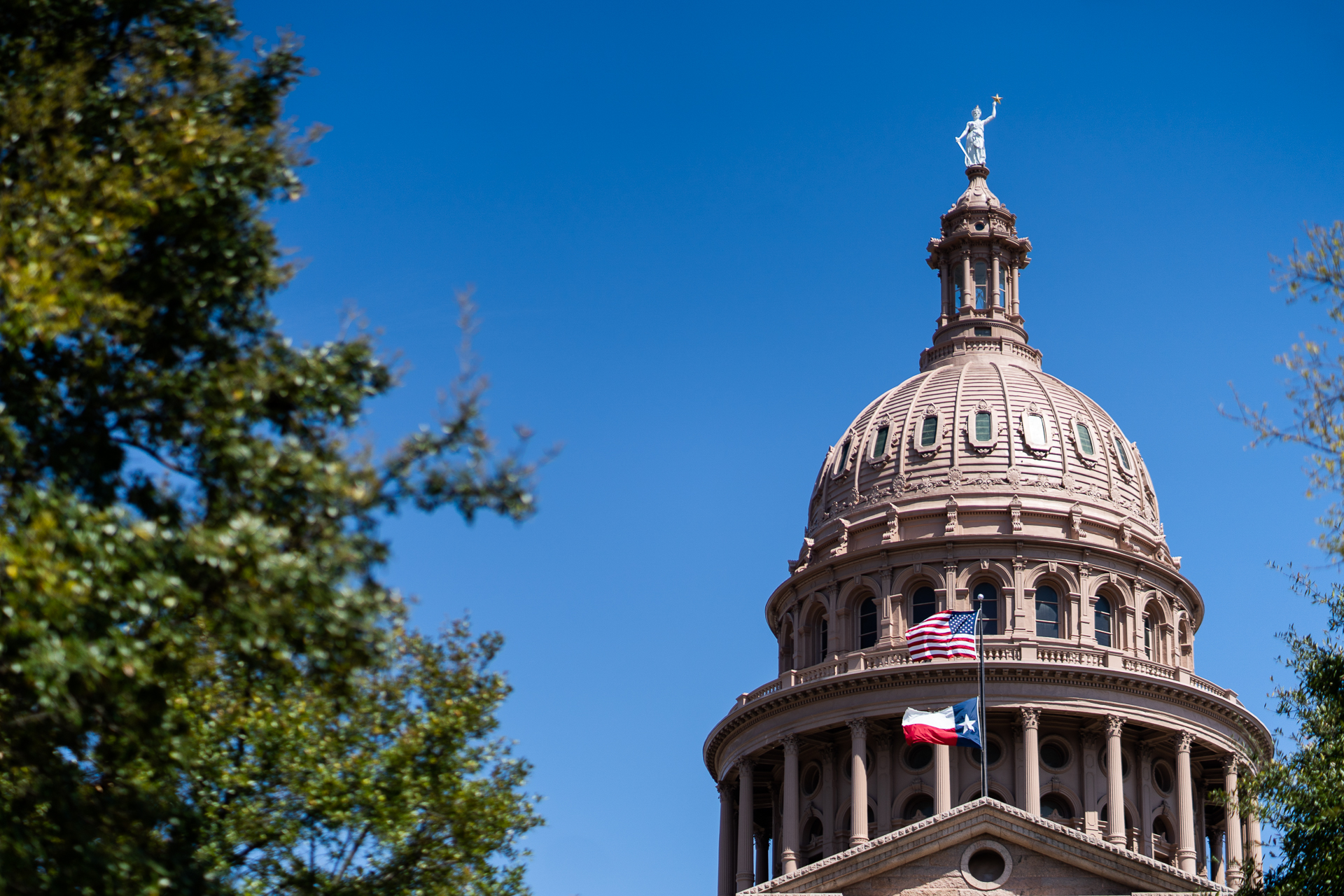
The Texas flag flying below the US flag at the Texas State Capitol

An urban legend holds that the Texas flag is the only state flag that is allowed to fly at the same height as the U.S. flag, but the legend is false. Neither the Joint Resolution for Annexing Texas to the United States nor the Ordinance of Annexation contains any provisions regarding flags. According to the United States Flag Code, any state flag can be flown at the same height as the U.S. flag, but the U.S. flag should be on its right (the viewer's left). Consistent with the U.S. Flag Code, the Texas Flag Code specifies that the state flag should be flown either below the U.S. flag if on the same pole or at the same height as the U.S. flag if on separate poles.

Legislation was introduced to the Texas Legislature in 2007 and 2009 to adopt the 1839 pilot flag/civil ensign of the Republic of Texas as the official flag of the governor of Texas, but the bills did not pass.

The Texas governor currently uses a flag consisting of the state coat of arms (a lone star encircled by live oak and olive branches) on a light blue circle, all on a dark blue field with a white star in each corner. The flag has been in use since the late 1960s or early 1970s. The design has never been formally adopted by executive order or legislation. Legislation was introduced to the Texas Legislature in 2007 and 2009 to adopt the 1839 pilot flag/civil ensign of the Republic of Texas as the official flag of the governor of Texas. While the 2007 bill died in committee, the 2009 bill was passed by the House but died in a Senate committee due to the flag's similarity to the flag of Russia.

Amendments to the Texas Flag Code, signed into law in 1993, authorize the governor to adopt a governor's flag, but this executive authority has not been exercised.

== Gallery ==
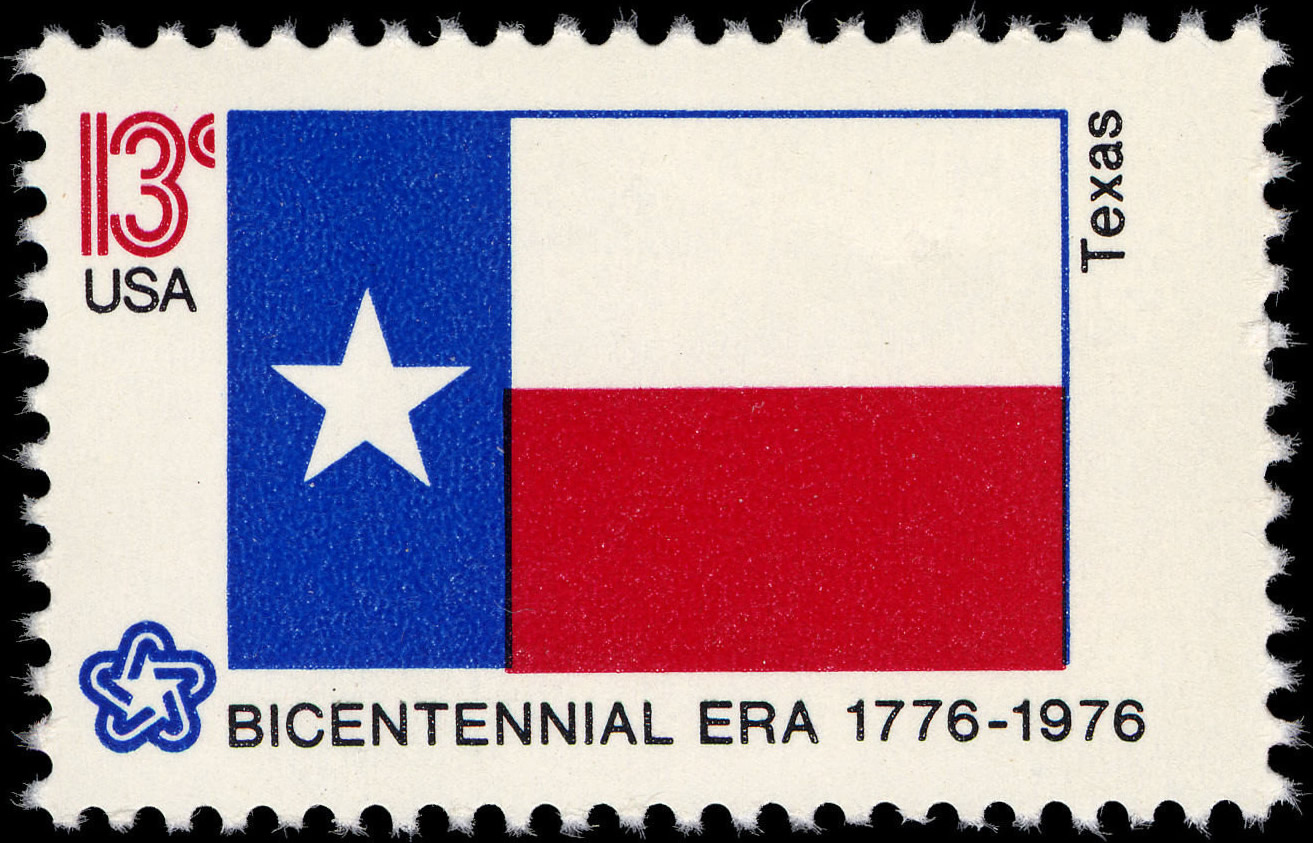
The Texas state flag as depicted in the 1976 bicentennial postage stamp series

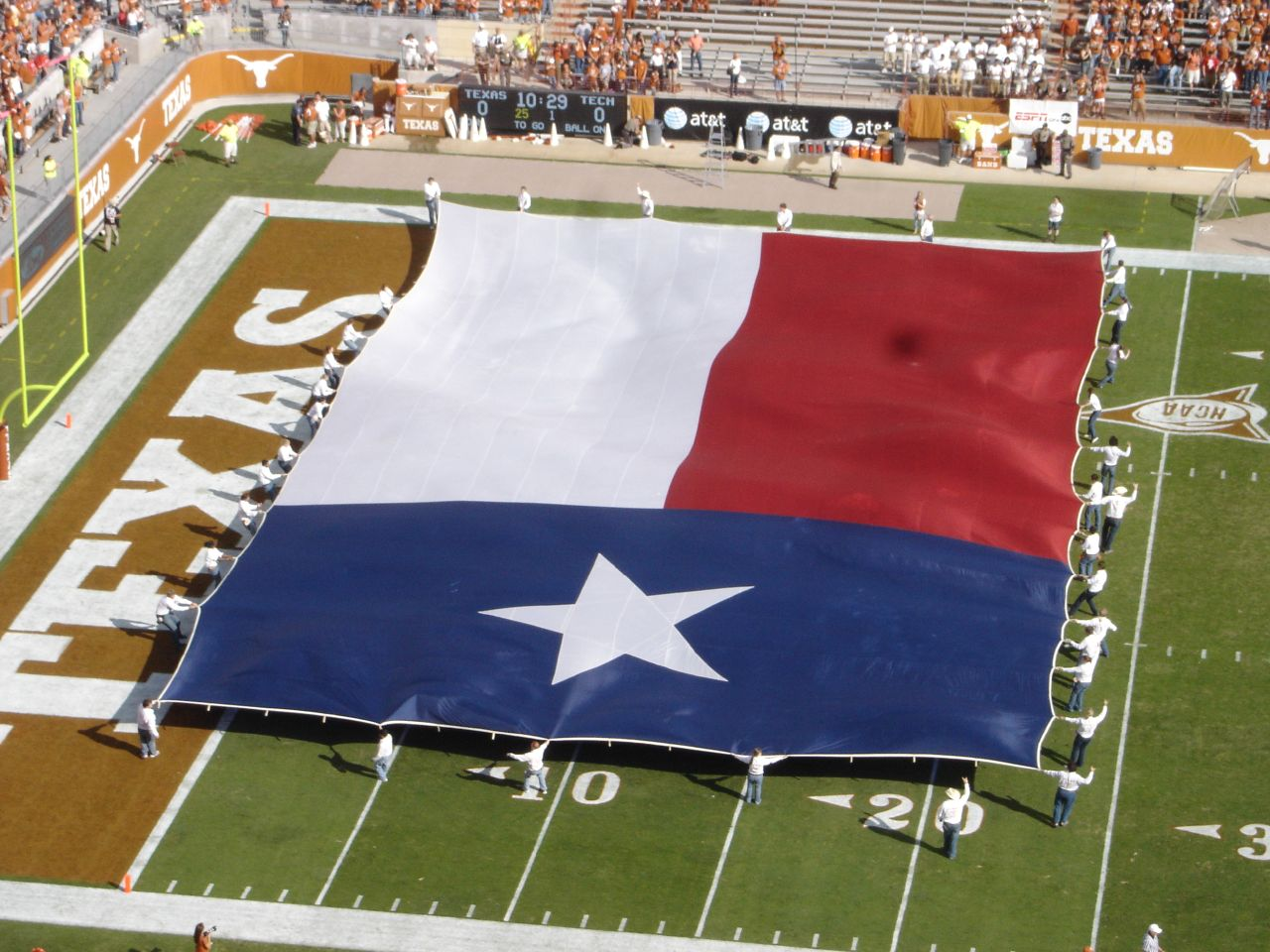
The world's largest Texas flag at a University of Texas at Austin football game.

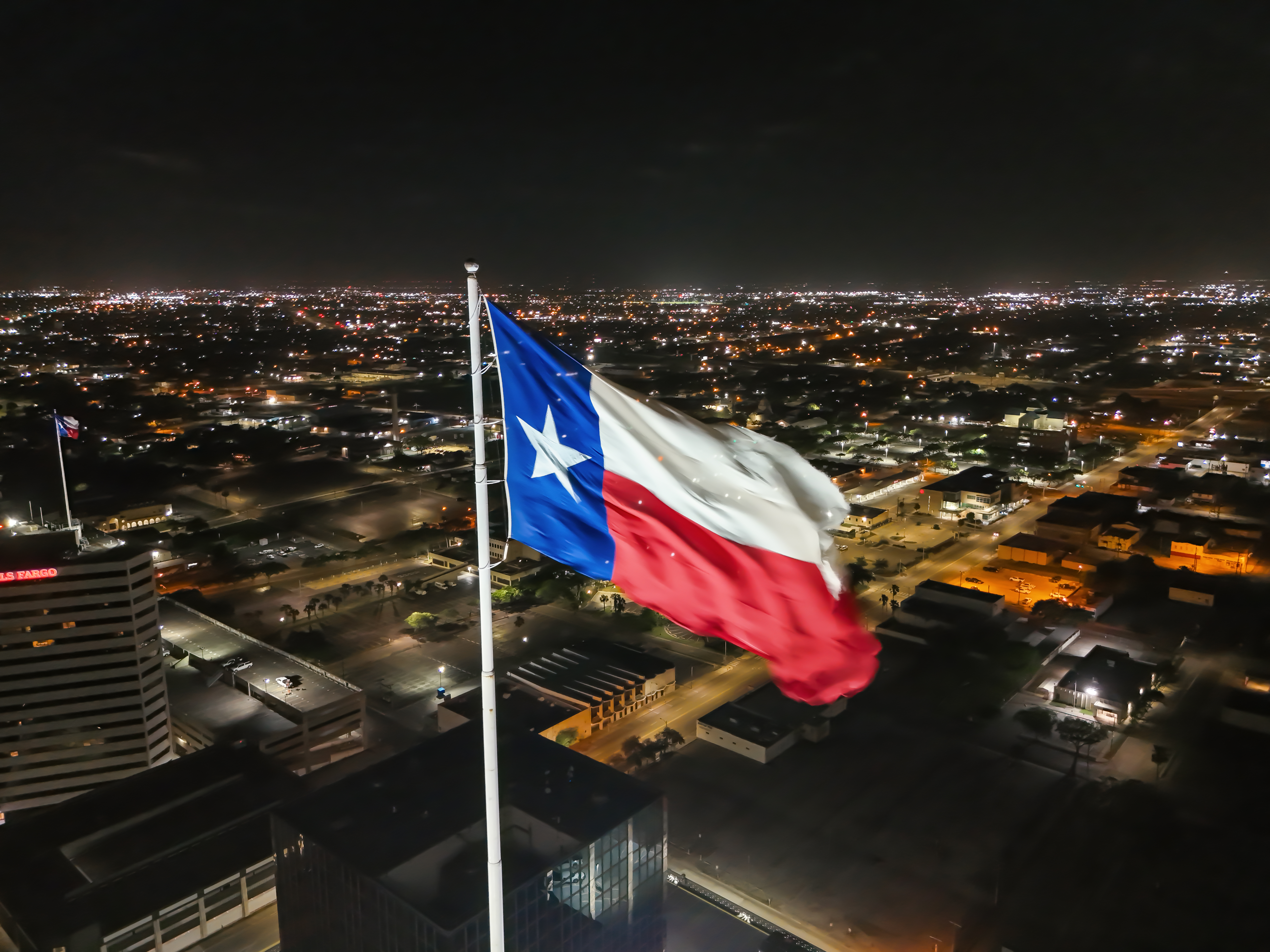
Flag of Texas over Corpus Christi.

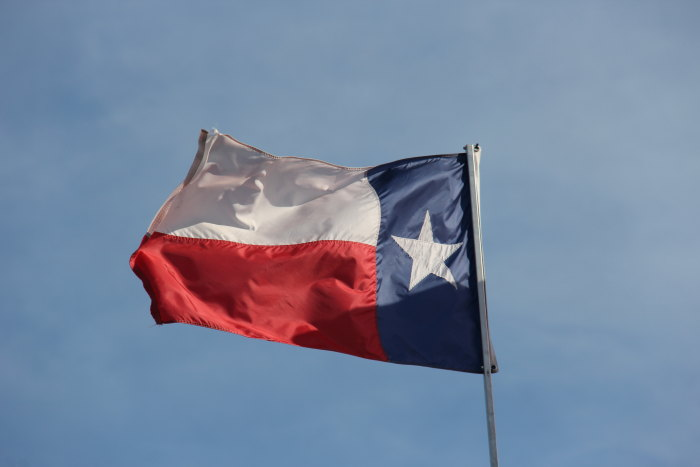
Flag of Texas over Bowmanville, Ontario in Canada.

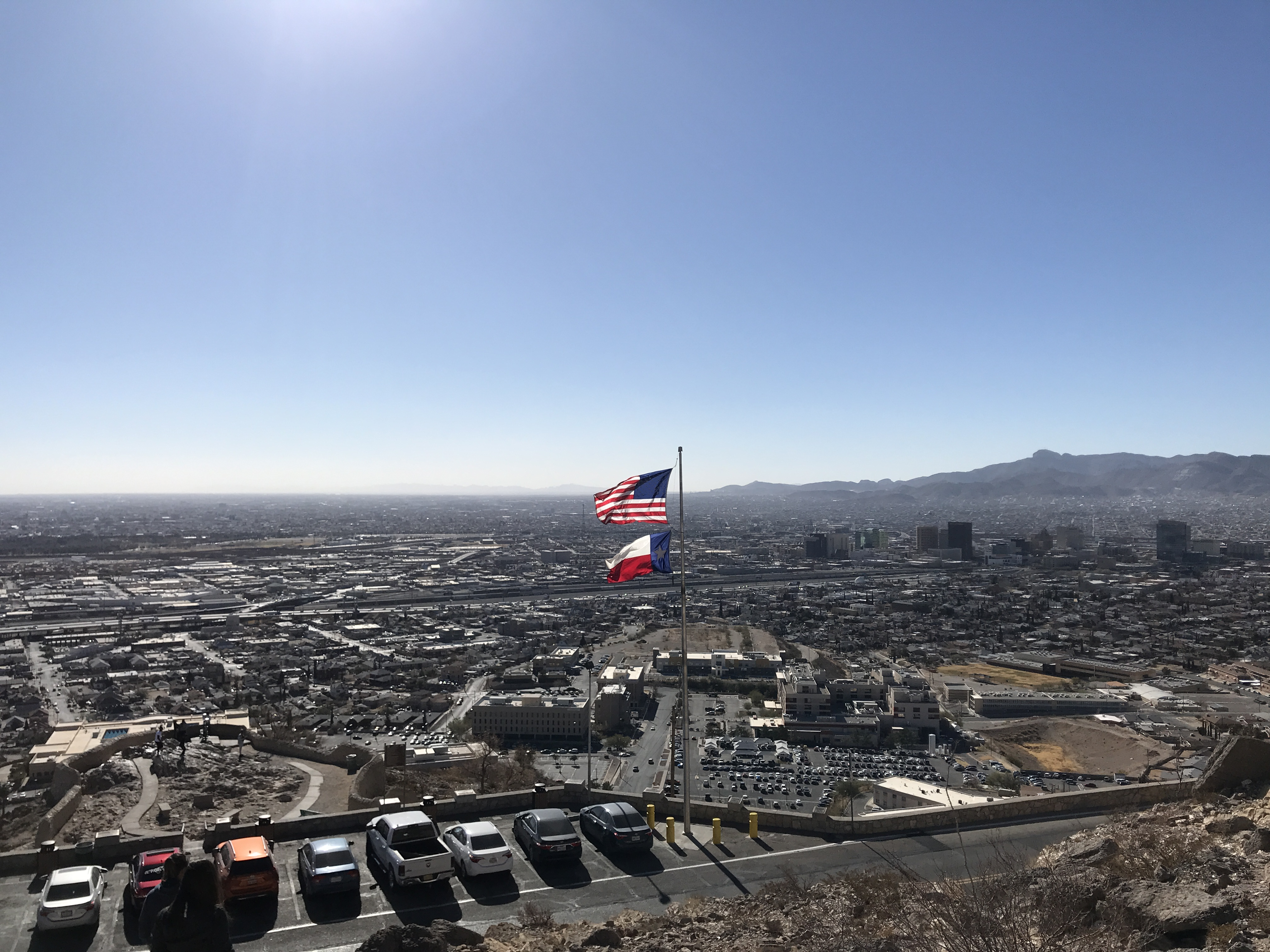
The Texas flag being flown under the US flag in El Paso.

A farm gate painted to look like the Texas flag.

== Historical flags of Texas ==
=== National flags over Texas ===
1685–1689
French flag possibly used by René-Robert Cavelier, Sieur de La Salle, during the French colonization of Texas

1689–1785
State flag and ensign of New Spain, also known as the Cross of Burgundy flag

1785–1821
Spanish state flag on land

1812–1813
The flag of the Gutiérrez–Magee Expedition, sometimes called the "first Republic of Texas", which encompassed land from San Antonio to Nacogdoches and Goliad.

1819–1821
One of the flags of the Long Expedition, sometimes called the "second Republic of Texas", from 1819 to 1821. This flag was known as the Jane Long Flag, named after James Long's wife. This is also the first Lone Star flag.

1821
Another flag of the Long Expedition, sometimes called the "second Republic of Texas". This flag was known as the James Long flag, named after James Long. Stripes were added to entice Americans to help James on his second attempt to claim Texas, though they controlled only Nacogdoches.

1821–1823
Flag of the first Mexican Empire

1823–1836
First flag of the Mexican Republic, flown over soil claimed by Mexico until the Texas Revolution

1826–1827
The Republic of Fredonia claimed land within Edward's land grant and its capital was Nacogdoches.

1836–1839
The Burnet Flag, used from December 1836 to 1839 as the national flag of the Republic of Texas until it was replaced by the currently used "Lone Star Flag"

1836–1839
The Lone Star and Stripes/Ensign of the First Texas Navy/War Ensign; it was the de facto national flag between 1835 and 1839

1839–1845/46
Republic of Texas national flag from 1839 to 1845/46; identical to modern state flag, except that the colors were not standardized, and often had a lighter shade

1840
Republic of the Rio Grande, which claimed control over a large section of South Texas

1846–1847
US flag in 1846 when Texas became part of the Union (for further US flags, see US flag § Historical progression of designs)

1861–1865
CS flag in 1861 when Texas became a part of the Confederacy (for further CS flags, see Flags of the Confederate States of America § National flags)

=== Pre-Revolutionary flags ===
Emerald flag of Augustus W. Magee and Bernardo Gutierrez's short-lived coup of 1812–13 which was the first Republic of Texas.

Used by Louis-Michel Aury as Civil and Military Governor of Texas (1816–1817)

Used by pirate Jean Lafitte at Galveston Island (1817–1821)

Jane Long Flag (1819), named after James Long's wife. The first uniquely Texan flag to predominantly feature a lone star which was flown over Nacogdoches as a republic of Texas, or the Second Republic of Texas.

Colonel James Long's flag (1821), the second of the Texas flags with a Lone Star after the "Jane Long" flag, which was the successor to the previous flag stated. It was to get Americans to join James' second attempt at creating a Texas republic.

Flag of the Fredonian Rebellion (1826)

Purported flag of the Mexican state of Coahuila y Tejas, though the style and color of the stars are speculative.

=== Revolutionary flags ===
During revolutionary eras of Texas history, during the Spanish Texas period, Mexican Texas period, and the times of the Texas Revolution, a great number and variety of flags appeared.

The "Come and Take It" flag (1835) was used by Texas settlers fighting under John Henry Moore at the Battle of Gonzales in October 1835

Flag (1835) flown over the Goliad Declaration of Independence; possibly the "Bloody arm flag" reported to have accompanied the Dodson flag at the Texas Declaration of Independence

"The Alamo Flag" (1835–1836); created in 1835, this flag was a reference to the Mexican constitution of 1824, in support of which the Texas rebels were fighting; supposedly flew at the Alamo

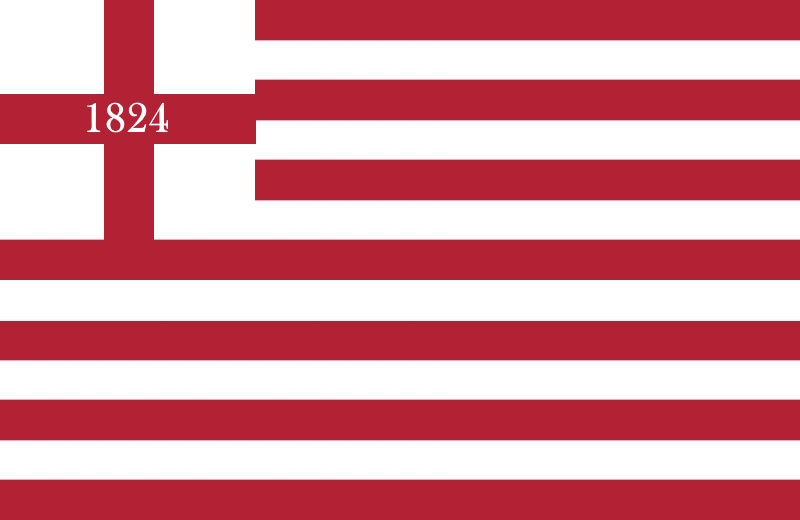
An ensign used by Texian rebels, as described by a Mexican military circular from January, 1836 (speculative recreation)

Brown Flag of Independence (1836), possibly the "Bloody arm flag" reported to have accompanied the Dodson flag at the Texas Declaration of Independence

The Dodson Tricolor or the Dodson Flag – Designed and sewn by a Mrs. Sarah Dodson during the Revolution

Flag designed by Stephen F. Austin between December 1835 and January 1836 while serving as a commissioner to the United States

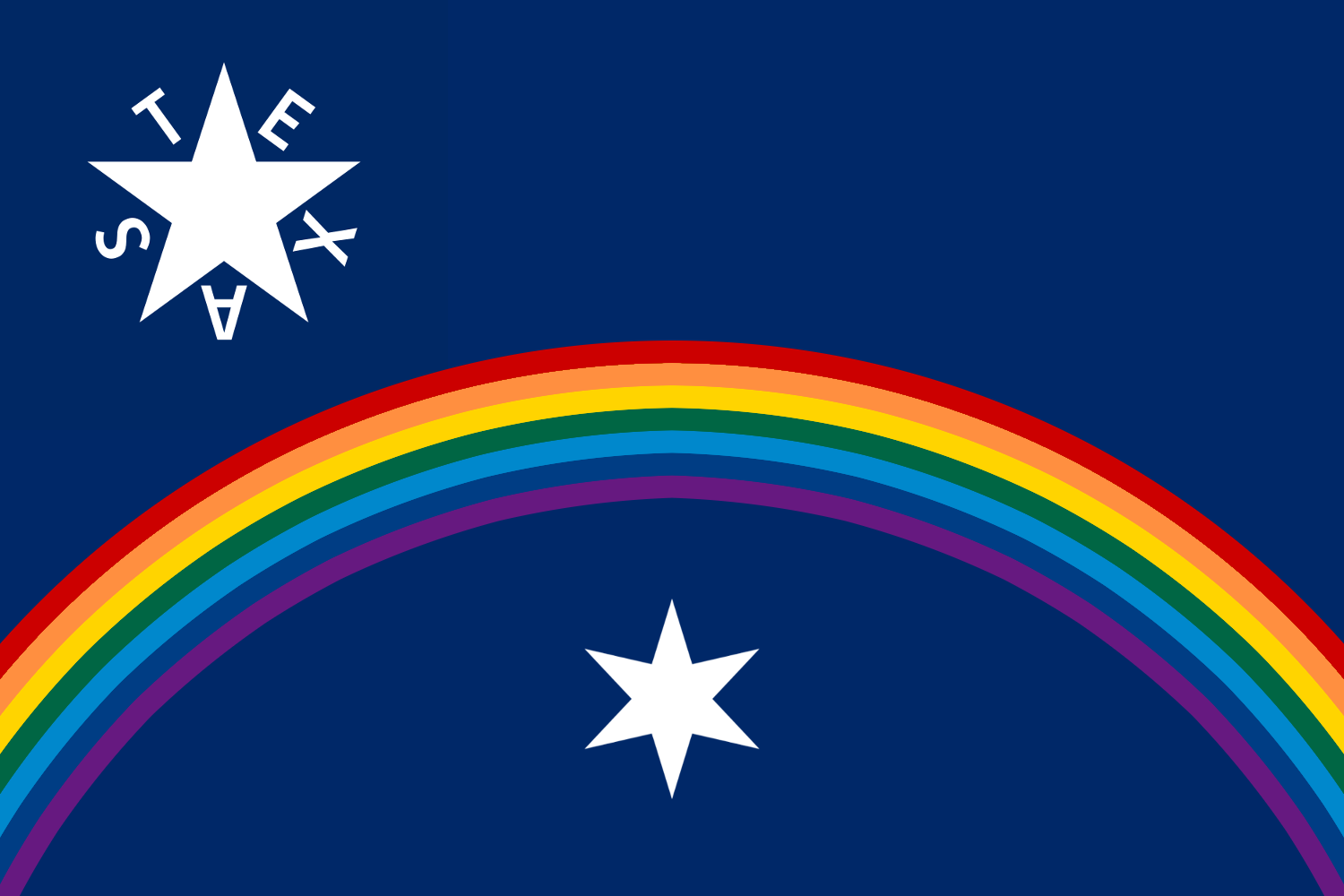
Speculative design of the amended Zavala flag based on the amendments in the remaining Washington-On-The-Brazos convention notes

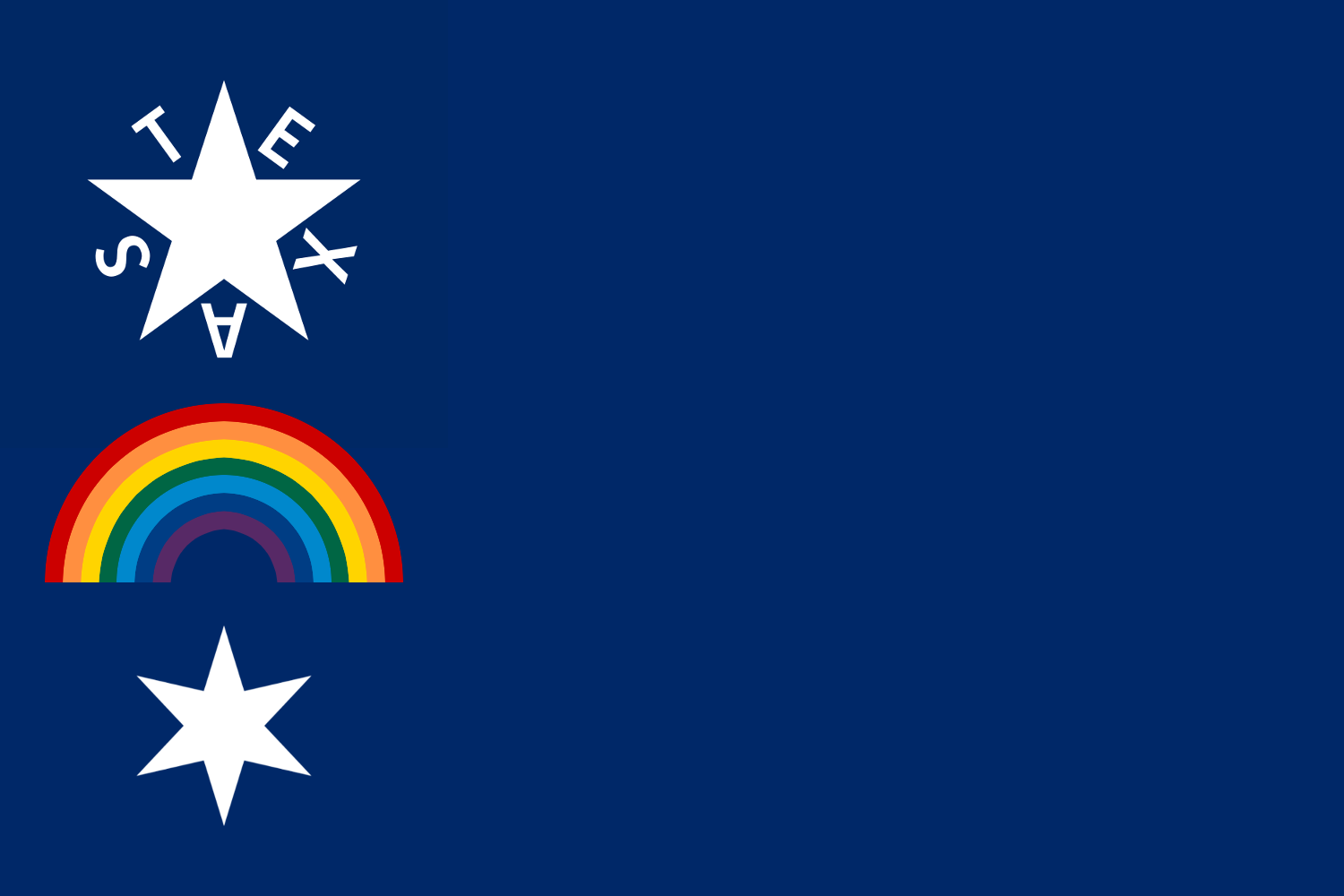
Speculative design of the amended Zavala flag based on the amendments in the remaining Washington-On-The-Brazos convention notes

Speculative design of the amended Zavala flag based on the July 7, 1836 issue of The New York American

The Zavala Flag, the purported first official flag of the Republic of Texas, reportedly designed by Lorenzo de Zavala

The "Burnet Flag" (1836–1839; 1839–1879), used from 1836 to 1839 as the national flag of the Republic of Texas until it was replaced by the currently used "Lone Star Flag"

The Lone Star and Stripes/Ensign of the First Texas Navy/War Ensign (1836–1839); it was the de facto national flag between 1835 and 1839

Captain William Scott's Liberals carried this flag in the Battle of Concepcion on October 28, 1835

This banner was carried by volunteers comprising Capt. Andrew Robinson's company from Harrisburg and designed by Sarah Rudolph Bradley Dodson in September 1835 for her husband, 1st Lt. A. B. Dodson and colleagues

Troutman flag under which the Georgia Battalion of Volunteers led by William Ward marched to Texas to participate in the fight against Mexico

Inspired by Gail Borden Jr., this flag was claimed to have been flown at the Battle of San Jacinto

Captain George H. Burroughs and company from Ohio came to Texas under this banner

The New Orleans Grays led by Captains Thomas H. Breece and Robert C. Morris participated in driving the Mexicans from San Antonio and many were massacred at Goliad

The flag of the Red Rovers of Alabama who were captured at the Battle of Coleto Creek on March 20, 1836, and were executed on March 27, 1836

San Jacinto Liberty Flag – The Sherman regiment carried this flag to victory at the decisive battle of San Jacinto

The Lone Star and Stripes/Ensign of the First Texas Navy/War Ensign flag was widely used by both Texan land and naval forces. This flag was simply the United States flag with a Lone star in the canton. This flag echoes an earlier design, carried by the forces of James Long in failed 1819 and 1821 attempts to separate Texas from Spanish control. This earlier flag was exactly the same, save for the canton having a red background rather than blue. Some evidence indicates that the Lone Star and Stripes flag was used at the battles of Goliad, the Alamo, and San Jacinto, and the first Congress of the Republic of Texas as convened under it in 1836. Although interim President David Burnet issued a decree making the Lone Star and Stripes the first official flag of the Republic of Texas, it never became the legal national flag. It did remain the naval flag of Texas until annexation and was noted for being "beneficial to our [Texan] Navy and Merchantmen" due to its resemblance to the U.S. flag. Despite its unofficial status, the flag remained well known inside the region and internationally as the symbol of Texas. The official blue and gold "Burnet Flag", though, was little known by Texans, and no contemporary illustrations of it have been discovered except for on the first series two-dollar note of the Texas dollar. An 1837 chart of national flags printed in Philadelphia showed the Lone Star and Stripes as the national flag of Texas, and Texas Senator Oliver Jones, who led the 1839 committee, which approved the Lone Star Flag, was unaware that the Lone Star and Stripes was not the current official flag. Later, prior to the American Civil War, this flag was carried by Floridian militiamen in Pensacola during the seizure of U.S. property in that city.

The "Come and Take It Flag" was created by the people of Gonzales, featuring the phrase, a black, five-pointed star, and the image of the town cannon Mexican forces had demanded they turn over. In March 1831, Juan Gomez, a lieutenant in the Mexican Army, granted a small cannon to the colony of San Antonio. It was then transported to Gonzales, Texas, and later was the object of Texas pride. At the minor skirmish known as the Battle of Gonzales, a small group of Texans successfully resisted the Mexican forces who had orders to seize their cannon. As a symbol of defiance, the Texans had fashioned a flag containing the phrase along with a black star and an image of the cannon, which they had received six years earlier from Mexican officials.

The so-called "Alamo Flag" or "1824 flag" was created by replacing the Eagle in the center of the Mexican tricolor with the year "1824", referencing the 1824 Constitution of Mexico, in support of which Texas was fighting. This was the first flag approved for use by rebel forces by a Texan legislative body. In 1835, the Texan provisional government approved the use of this flag for privateers preying on Mexican commerce. It has often been said that the 1824 flag was flown by Texan forces at the Battle of the Alamo. However, this was never alleged until 1860, long after the battle had occurred. Modern writers have pointed out that the presence of the 1824 flag at the time and place of the battle is highly unlikely. A similar flag was flown at least briefly by Texan Tejano forces, featuring two black, six-pointed stars in place of the date. The actual "Alamo flag" likely referred to by accounts of the time was the Lone Star and Stripes, which had been depicted in use at earlier battles, such as Goliad, and was widely referred to as the "Texian flag".

The Dodson Tricolor or Dodson flag was designed and sewn by a Mrs. Sarah Dodson during the revolution. It resembled the flag of Revolutionary France, but with longer proportions and the Texan Lone Star in the canton. Stephen F. Austin was initially so alarmed by the obvious symbolism that he requested the flag not be used, but it nevertheless flew over Texan forces in Cibolo Creek and may have been the first Texan flag raised over San Antonio. The flag was one of two that flew over the small cabin in which Texas delegates ratified their declaration of independence.

=== Republic of Texas flags ===
1836–1839; 1839–1879
The "Burnet Flag", used from 1836 to 1839 as the national flag of the Republic of Texas until it was replaced by the currently used "Lone Star Flag"; it was the de jure war flag from then until 1879

1836–1839
War ensign and de facto national flag between 1835 and 1839; it was also the ensign of the First Texas Navy from 1836 to 1839; it was prominently featured on the $10 and $50 notes of the Texas dollar

1839–1845/46
The "Lone Star Flag", the Republic of Texas national flag from 1839 to 1845/46; official naval ensign for the Texas Navy from 1839

1839–1845
Revenue Service flag

1839–1845
Coasting Trader ensign

1839–1845
Pilot flag/Civil ensign

The Burnet Flag was adopted by the Texan Congress on December 10, 1836. The name refers David G. Burnet, who was provisional president of the Republic of Texas when the flag was adopted. It consisted of an azure background with a large golden star, inspired by the 1810 "Bonnie Blue Flag" of the Republic of West Florida. Variants of the Burnet Flag with a white star, virtually identical to the Bonnie Blue Flag, were also common. Other variants featured the star (of either color) upside down, and/or ringed with the word TEXAS, with each letter filling one of the gaps of the star.

=== State flags over Texas ===
Flag of the State of Coahuila y Tejas as a part of Mexico (1824–1835)

Flag of the State of Texas as a part of the United States (1845–present)

=== Secession flags of Texas, 1861 ===
In early 1861, between the secession of Texas from the U.S. and its accession to the Confederacy, Texas flew an unofficial, variant flag of Texas with fifteen stars, representing the fifteen slave states. No drawings exist of the flag; there are only imprecise descriptions. The flag may have been based on the state flag or the Bonnie Blue Flag.

Possible secession flag based on the state flag

Possible secession flag based on the Bonnie Blue Flag

=== Civil War flags ===
Various flags used by Texan soldiers during the American Civil War.

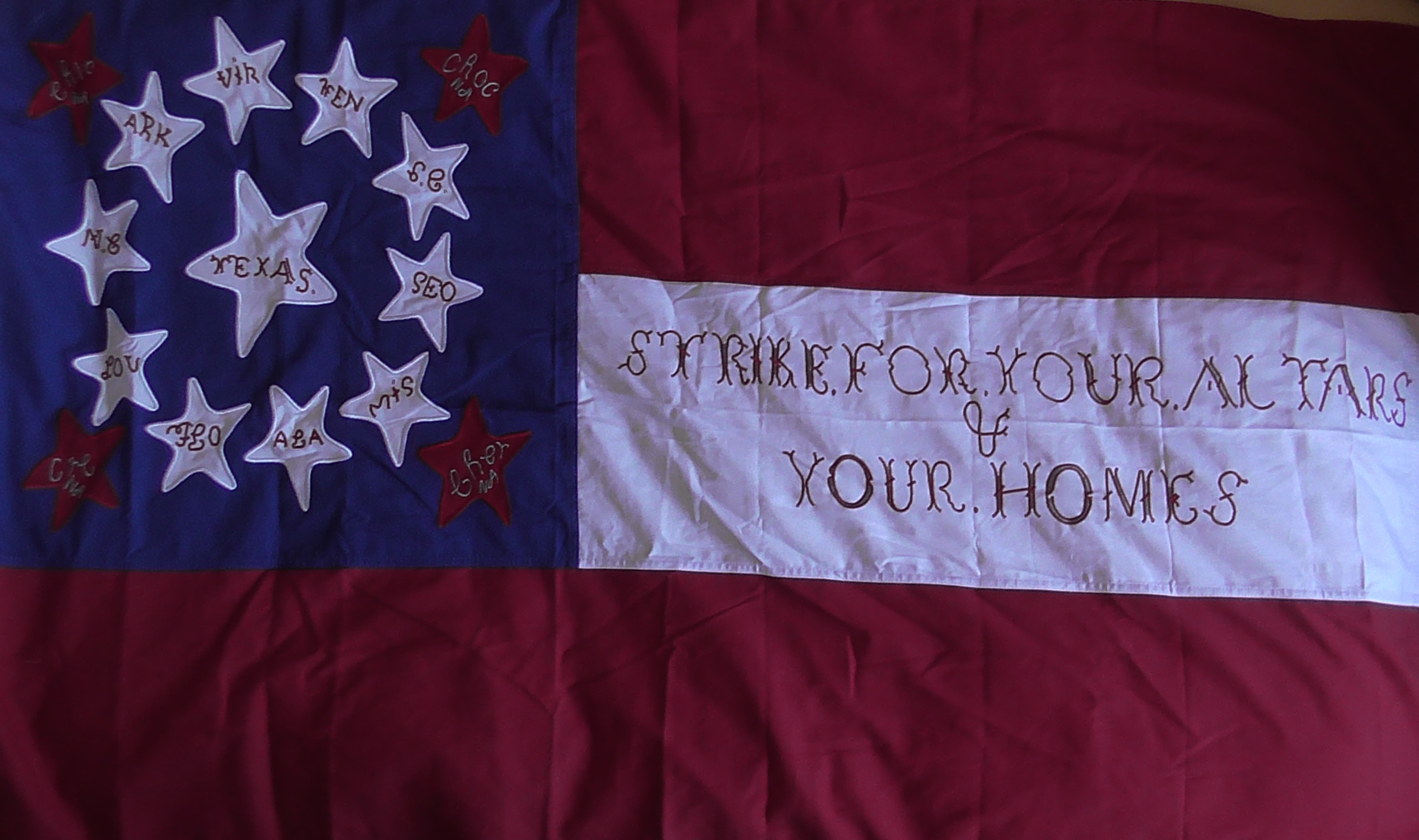
An example of the flag of the 10th Texas Cavalry

Flag of the 11th Texas Cavalry (obverse)

Flag of the 11th Texas Cavalry (reverse)

17th and 18th Texas Cavalry (1862–1865)

This flag flew over the Alamo when Texas seceded in 1861; it was later given to Hood's Texas Brigade

32nd Texas Cavalry Wood's Regiment. (1862)

Company B. 4th Texas Hood's Brigade. Was most likely used as a camp flag or a flank marker.

Flag of the 1st Texas Volunteer Infantry Regiment (August 1861 – April 1865)

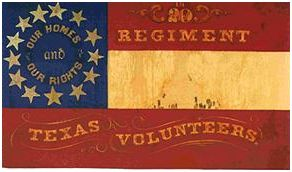
Flag of the 20th Regiment Texas Volunteer Infantry

Army of New Mexico (late 1861–1862)

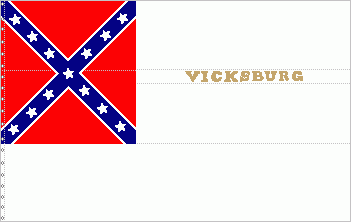
Flag of Waul's Legion (Spring 1862 – July 4, 1863)

The flag of the 26th Texas Cavalry Regiment

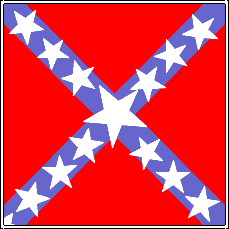
Flag of Terry's Texas Rangers (1861–1865)

=== Commemorative flags of Texas ===
A centennial flag was created for the Texas Centennial Exposition of 1936, a world fair located in Dallas to mark the 100th anniversary of Texas independence.

To mark the Texas Sesquicentennial (150th anniversary) of Texas's independence in 1986, a flag was created bearing the Texas Sesquicentennial logo.

Flag celebrating the 100th anniversary of Texas independence

Flag celebrating the 150th anniversary of Texas independence

Flag (c. 1846) flown to celebrate Texas statehood

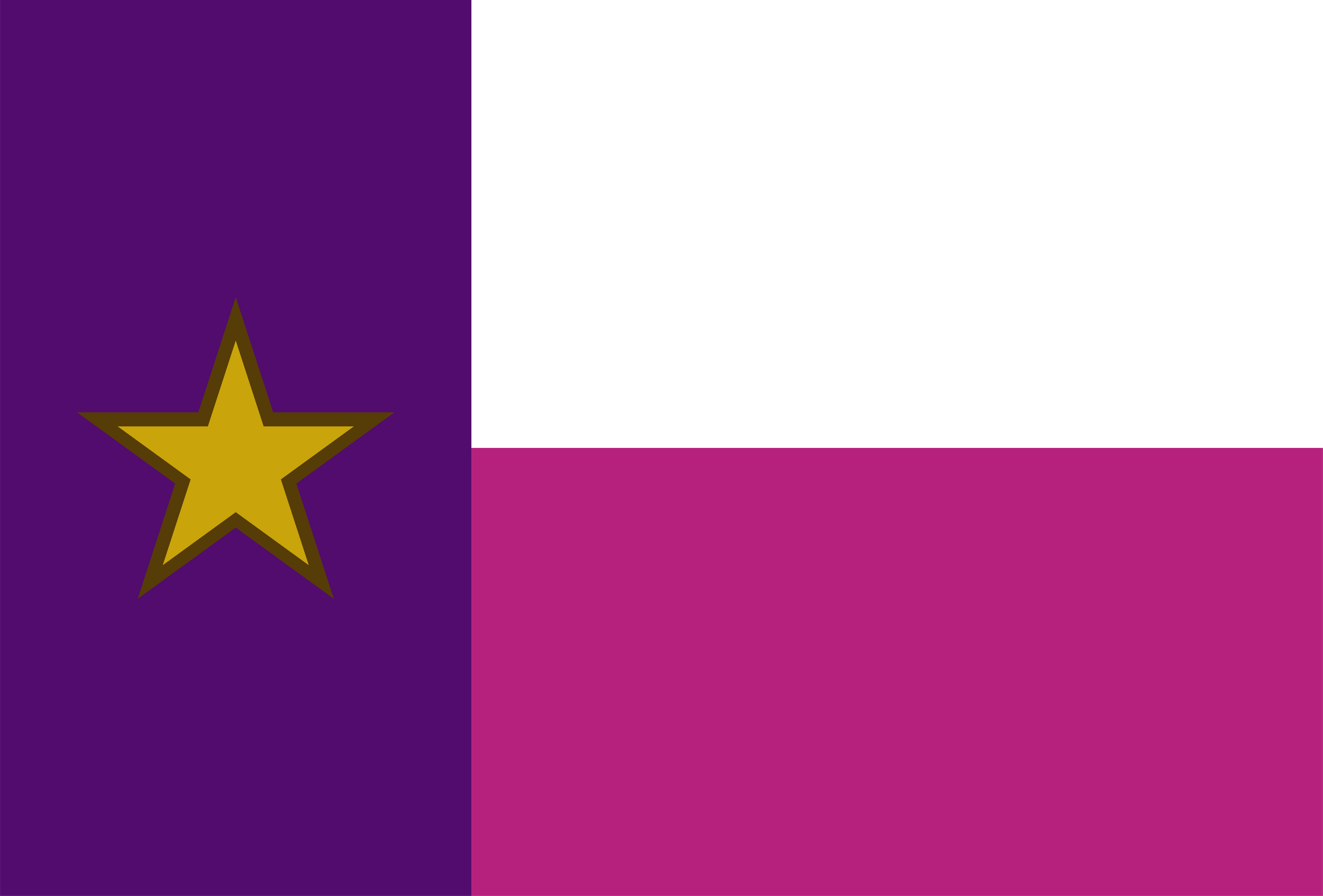
Digital reconstruction of the Texas flag carried by state delegates in Washington D. C. on July 4, 1848

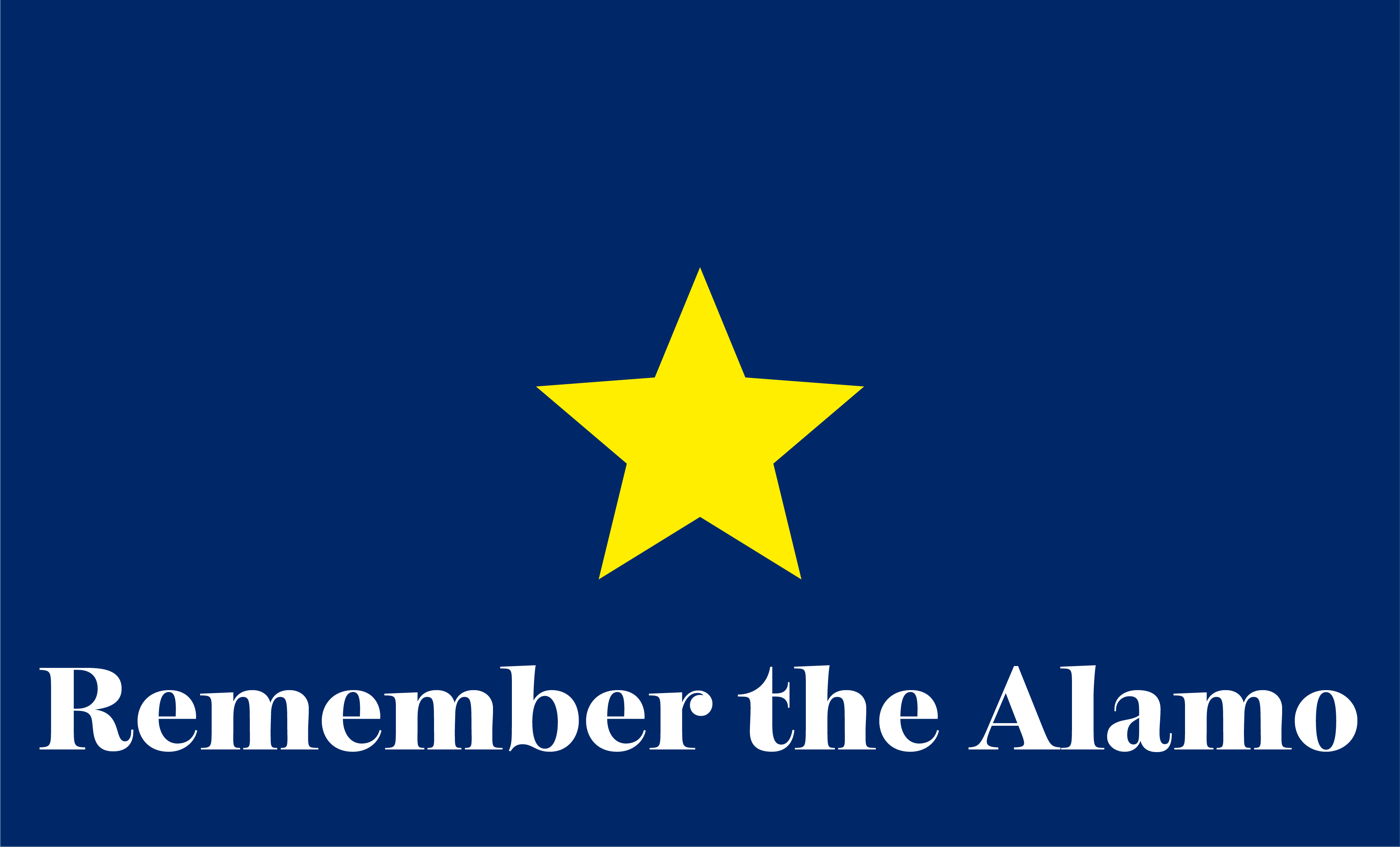
Digital reconstruction of the "Remember the Alamo" flag flown in Pueblo, Colorado, on July 4, 1897

== See also ==
- Symbols of the State of Texas
- Six flags over Texas
- World's Largest Texas Flag
- Dodson tri-color flag
