= Jane Birdsall Harris =

Texas pioneer and innkeeper (1791–1869)

Jane Birdsall Harris (September 21, 1791–August 15, 1869) was a pioneer in Harris County, Texas.

== Early life ==
Jane Birdsall Harris was born on September 21, 1791, in Waterloo, New York. Her parents were Lewis Birdsall and Patience Lee Birdsall.

Her brother, Maurice Lee Birdsall, built the 1838 Harris County Courthouse.

== Pioneering ==
After marrying John Richardson Harris on May 7, 1813, the family moved to Missouri, where they lived until 1824. However, she and their children returned to New York when John Harris prepared to settle in Mexican Texas. John Harris died, and Jane Harris moved to Texas in 1833 in order to make a claim on his estate, which consisted of land in Harrisburg, Texas and the surrounding area.

In the spring of 1836, during the Texas Revolution, Harris resided at the townsite platted by her husband. The interim Texas executive government migrated east to safety, and met at the Harris house, which at that time operated as an inn. A few weeks later, during the Runaway Scrape, Harris fled first to Anahuac, Texas and eventually to Galveston.

After the Texian victory at the Battle of San Jacinto, Harris returned to the Harrisburg homestead, where enslaved Mexican soldiers harvested timber and constructed a log house for her. In 1841, this simple structure was covered with weatherboard and enhanced with a wraparound gallery supported by classical columns.

== Personal life ==
Harris had no fewer than two sons and one daughter. Her daughter was Mary Jane Briscoe, born in Ste. Genevieve, Missouri. One of her sons was Dewitt Clinton Harris. A second son was John Birdsall Harris.

== Death and legacy ==
Harris died on August 15, 1869, in Houston. She is buried in Houston at Glendale Cemetery.

== Bibliography ==
- Bradley, Barrie Scardino (2020). Improbable Metropolis: Houston's Architectural and Urban History. Austin: University of Texas Press. ISBN 978-1-4773-2019-8.
- Houghton, Dorothy Knox Howe; Bradley, Barrie Scardino; Howe, Katherine S.; Blackburn, Sadie Gwin (1998). Houston's Forgotten Heritage: Landscapes, Houses, Interiors, 1824–1914 (Second ed.). College Station: Texas A&M University Press. ISBN 978-1-62349-246-5.
