= Andrew Briscoe =

American politician (1810–1849)

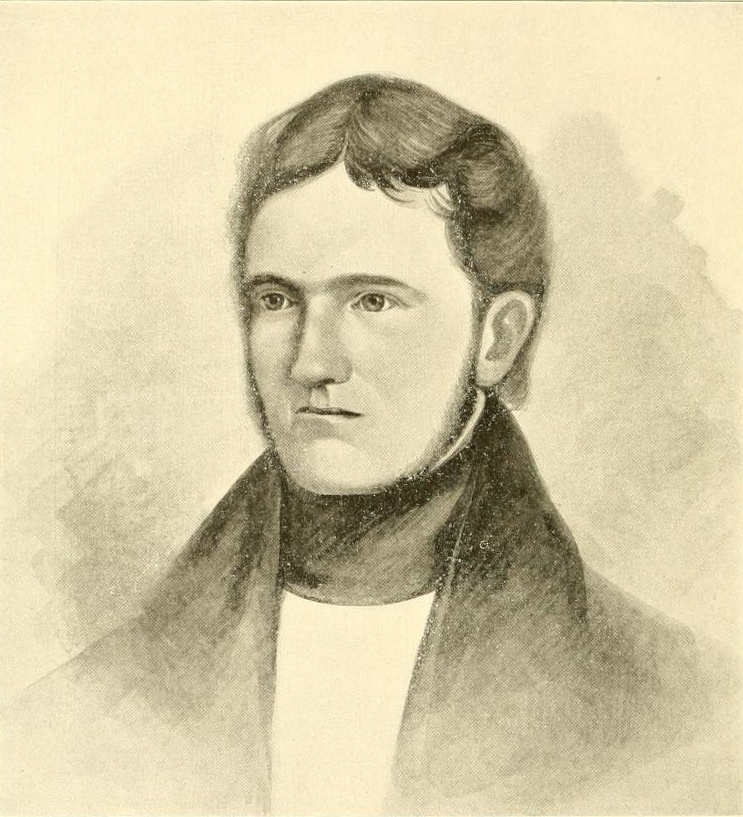
- Born: November 25, 1810; Claiborne County, Mississippi
- Died: October 4, 1849 (aged 38); New Orleans, Louisiana
- Relatives: Parmenas Briscoe (father), Dolph Briscoe (descendant)
- Military career
- Allegiance: Republic of Texas
- Branch: (Republic of Texas) Texas Army
- Service years: 1835–1836
- Rank: Captain
- Commands: Liberty Volunteers; Company A, Infantry Regulars
- Conflicts: Battle of Concepción, Siege of Bexar, Battle of San Jacinto

Andrew Briscoe (November 25, 1810 – October 4, 1849) was a merchant, revolutionary, soldier, and jurist. He was an organizer of the Texas Revolution, attending the Convention of 1836 and signing the Texas Declaration of Independence. He fought in three major battles, including the victory at San Jacinto. He was the first Chief Justice of Harrisburg County, Texas.

== Early life ==
Andrew was born in Claiborne County, Mississippi on November 25, 1810. He was the son of prominent Mississippi state legislator Parmenas Briscoe (1784–1850), and his second wife, Mary "Polly" Montgomery (1794–1845). He had one half-brother from his father's first marriage, four full brothers, and six full sisters. Andrew and his full brother, James Montgomery Briscoe, emigrated to Texas in the 1830s.

== Career ==
Briscoe emigrated to Texas, gained Mexican citizenship in 1833, then settled in Anahuac, Texas, where he opened a store. He was among the local businessmen who protested the manner in which Mexican authorities collected import duties. He was jailed with DeWitt Clinton Harris, catalyzing an armed confrontation led by William B. Travis, the second of the Anahuac Disturbances. He volunteered on behalf of the Texian rebels at the Battle of Concepción, Siege of Bexar, and led Company A, Infantry Regulars at the decisive Battle of San Jacinto.

Briscoe signed the Texas Declaration of Independence.

Briscoe was a delegate to the Texas Convention of 1836. After Texas Independence, President Sam Houston appointed him to serve as the first Chief Justice of Harrisburg County, later renamed Harris County, Texas. After his term ended in 1839, he retired from office and became a cattle dealer. In 1839, he planned a new railroad from town of Harrisburg, Texas to the Brazos River. He hired workers to grade a roadbed and lay ties for about two miles before running short of capital.

== Personal life ==
In August 1837, Briscoe married Mary Jane Harris in Harris County. Harris was a surviving daughter of Jane BIrdsall Harris, and John Richardson Harris, who had received a land grant from the Austin Colony, founded Harrisburg, Texas, and was the namesake of Harris County.

In 1837, the Briscoes resided in a house at the northwest corner of Main Street and Prairie Avenue in Houston. This dwelling constructed by builder-architect, Thomas William Ward, a small Greek Revival house on a large lot with a variety of flowering trees and fruit trees. They lived in this house until 1839, when they sold it to John Birdsall.

== Death and legacy ==
In the spring of 1849, Briscoe moved with his family to New Orleans, where he lived until his death on October 4. Surviving Briscoe were his wife and four children. He is buried in the Texas State Cemetery in Austin, Texas.

Briscoe County, Texas, is named in his honor.

== Bibliography ==
- Fox, Stephen (2022). The Architecture of Birdsall P. Briscoe. College Station, TX: Texas A&M University Press. ISBN 978-1648430527.
- Houghton, Dorothy Knox Howe; Bradley, Barrie Scardino; Howe, Katherine S.; Blackburn, Sadie Gwin (1998). Houston's Forgotten Heritage: Landscapes, Houses, Interiors, 1824−1914. College Station, TX: Texas A&M University Press. ISBN 978-1-62349-246-5.
- Muir, Andrew Forest (1944). "Railroad Enterprise in Texas, 1836−1841". Southwestern Historical Quarterly. 47 (4): 339−370.
