= Jane Harris (artist) =

British painter (1956–2022)

- Born: 1956; Dorset
- Died: 2022 (aged 65–66)
- Education: Bournemouth College of Art; Slade School of Art; Goldsmiths College
- Occupation: Artist
- Spouse: Jiri Kratochvil
- Children: 1

Jane Harris (1956 – 2022) was a British painter.

== Biography ==
=== Early life and education ===
Harris was born in 1956, and spent her formative years in Dorset. She began her art studies at Bournemouth College of Art. She went on to the Slade School of Art. Ten years later she renewed her studies, graduating with an MA in fine art from Goldsmiths College, London as part of the Frieze generation of artists. In 2006, Harris moved permanently to the Dordogne, France, with her husband, sculptor Jiri Kratochvil, and their son George.

=== Career ===
Harris taught at Goldsmiths for over a decade, and eventually became a course leader on the art master's degree. For 30 years Jane Harris explored, through a set of self-imposed rules, the perceptual qualities of the ellipse. Through the use of various painting techniques, the artist adapted the form to suggest multiple characteristics. These included both decorative and minimalist qualities, often utilizing specific applications of paint to create visual effects. Using painted oils, each of the brushstrokes that marked out her curvilinear shapes described both a form and a texture that captured light and reflected it.

== Collections and recognition ==
Harris received numerous awards, research grants and prizes through her career, including the Arts Foundation Painting Fellowship (1995), prize winner at the John Moores Liverpool (1995), Jerwood Drawing Open (1996) and the Sunny Dupree Family Award for a woman artist at the Royal Academy Summer Exhibition (2012). In 2011 and 2015 she was artist in residence at the Josef and Anni Albers Foundation in Connecticut, USA and in 2012 at the artistes en résidence, Clermont-Ferrand, France.

Harris exhibited internationally, and is represented in significant public collections including Arts Council England; Birmingham Museum and Art Gallery; Centre Nationale des Arts Plastiques, Cnap, France; Colorado University Art Museum, USA; Fitzwilliam Museum, Cambridge; FRAC MÈCA La Nouvelle Aquitaine, FRAC-Artothèque Limousin, FRAC Poitou-Charente; Pallant House, Chichester (Golder-Thompson Gift); Rhode Island School of Design Museum, USA; Southampton City Art Gallery; UK Government Art Collection as well as in corporate and private collections.

== The Jane Harris Estate ==
The Jane Harris Estate is managed by Freeny Yianni of Close ltd gallery, and gallerist Prue O'Day. Freeny Yianni first worked with Harris while she was with Lisson Gallery, and has represented her since 2019. Prue O'Day supported Harris after she graduated with exhibitions at the Anderson O'Day Gallery, and became a lifelong family friend. The Jane Harris estate is represented by Close and O'Day on behalf of Jiri and George Kratochvil.
