= Mary Jane Briscoe =

Civic leader in Texas

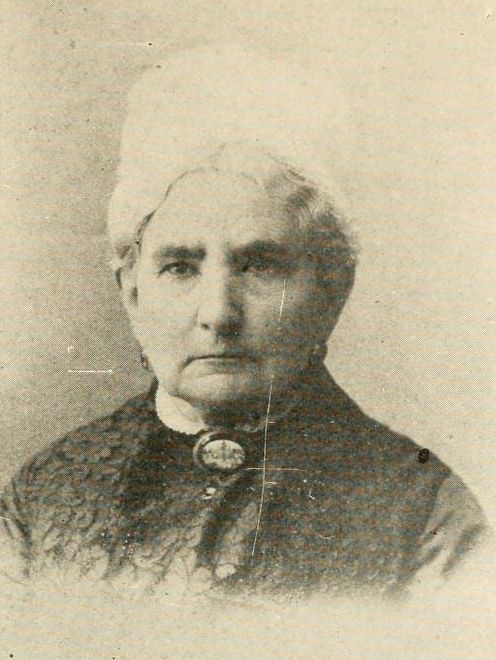
Mary Jane Briscoe

Mary Jane Briscoe (née Harris; August 17, 1819–March 8, 1903) was a founder of the Daughters of the Republic of Texas.

== Early life ==
Mary Jane Harris was born on August 17, 1819 in Ste. Genevieve, Missouri to John Harris and Jane Harris.

John Harris knew Moses Austin in Missouri, who persuaded him to participate as a settler in his colonization scheme of Mexican Texas. John Harris first moved his family back to Cayuga, New York before his Texas venture. She attended school for several years before moving with her mother and brothers to Harrisburg, Texas in 1836, which had been founded by her father. She married Andrew Briscoe on August 17, 1837.

== Personal life ==
Mary Jane Harris married Andrew Briscoe in August 1837. Andrew Briscoe was at that time the Chief Justice of Harrisburg County. They resided in a house on Main Street in Houston, then recently constructed by builder-architect, Thomas William Ward. They lived there until 1839, when they sold it to her cousin, John Birdsall. Meanwhile the Briscoes moved to Harrisburg in order to pursue business opportunities there.

Mary Jane and Andrew Briscoe had four children who survived infancy. Just as Andrew prepared to moved the family to New Orleans in 1849, he fell ill and died. Mary Jane moved her family to live in Mississippi with Parmenas Briscoe, her father-in-law. She relocated to Anderson, Texas around 1852. She resided in Galveston from 1856 to 1859 before returning to her mother's homestead in Harrisburg. She moved to Houston in 1874.

== Civic life ==
Briscoe was one of the founders of the Daughters of the Republic of Texas (DRT) when she convened an organizational meeting at her home in Houston on November 6, 1891. At that time, the group selected her as the Vice-President. She also served as President of Sheltering Arms, a home for women. After a serious injury which impaired her mobility, she hosted meetings of the San Jacinto Chapter of the DRT at her home.

== Death ==
Briscoe died in Houston on March 8, 1903. She was buried in Houston at Glenwood Cemetery.

== Bibliography ==
- Fox, Stephen (2022). The Architecture of Birdsall P. Briscoe. College Station, TX: Texas A&M University Press. ISBN 978-1648430527.
- Houghton, Dorothy Knox Howe; Bradley, Barrie Scardino; Howe, Katherine S.; Blackburn, Sadie Gwin (1998). Houston's Forgotten Heritage: Landscapes, Houses, Interiors, 1824−1914. College Station, TX: Texas A&M University Press. ISBN 978-1-62349-246-5.
- Looscan, Adele B. (1903). "Mrs. Mary Jane Briscoe". Southwestern Historical Quarterly. 7 (1): 65–71.
