= John Richardson Harris =

Colonist of Mexican Texas

John R. Harris
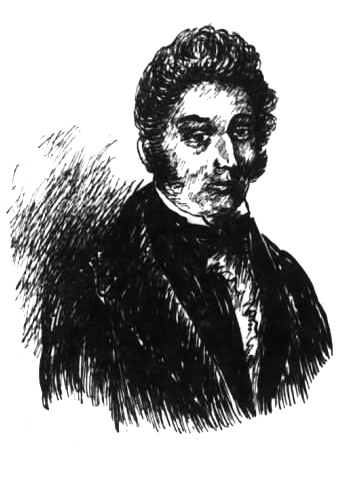
- Born: October 22, 1790; Cayuga, New York, U.S.
- Died: August 21, 1829 (aged 38); New Orleans, Louisiana, U.S.
- Cause of death: Yellow fever
- Citizenship: United States, Mexico
- Occupations: Trader, machinist, sailer
- Spouse: Jane Birdsall Harris
- Children: DeWitt Clinton Harris, Lewis Birdsall Harris, Mary Jane Harris Briscoe, John Birdsall Harris
- Parent(s): John Harris, Mary (Richardson) Harris
- Relatives: David Harris, William Plunkett Harris

John Richardson Harris (October 22, 1790 – August 21, 1829) was an American settler of Mexican Texas and the namesake of Harris County, Texas. He founded the town of Harrisburg, Texas, and Harris County, Texas is named in his honor.

== Family life ==
Harris was born on October 22, 1790, to John and Mary (Richardson) Harris in Cayuga, New York. After serving in the War of 1812, he married Jane Birdsall, and they took residence near Waterloo, New York. Their first sons were born there: DeWitt Clinton Harris and Lewis Birdsall Harris. The family migrated to Ste. Genevieve, Missouri in 1819, where Mary Jane Harris and John Birdsall Harris were born.

== Gone to Texas ==
Harris prepared to locate to Texas at the urging of Moses Austin. To prepare for this gamble, he resettled his family in upstate New York. In 1823, he sailed his boat from New Orleans to Buffalo Bayou, where he scouted locations for a trading post.

Harris was granted a league of land 4,428 acres (1,792 hectares) at Buffalo Bayou on August 16, 1824. He contracted for a town plat of Harrisburg in 1826, while he established a trading post and a grist mill there. He named the new town for Harrisburg, Pennsylvania, the namesake of his great-grandfather.

In addition to the grist mill, he ran a saw mill with the assistance of his two brothers, David Harris and William Plunkett Harris, and his business partner, Robert Wilson. They also offered carpentry and blacksmithing services. Harris and Wilson managed a small fleet of sailing ships, which imported trade goods from the United States and Mexico, and exported cotton and lumber. John Richardson and David Harris founded a second trading post at Bell’s Landing, Texas.

== Death and legacy ==
Harris started building what was the first steam saw mill in Texas. With machine belts needed to complete the project, he sailed to New Orleans. He arrived amidst a yellow fever epidemic and died there on August 21, 1829.

In 1833, two parties filed claims on the John Harris Richardson estate. Wilson and William Plunkett Harris claimed the real estate and equipment as their own. John Richardson Harris’s widow, Jane Harris, and DeWitt Clinton Harris arrived in Texas for the first time to make a competing claim. In 1836, Augustus Chapman Allen and John Kirby Allen approached the Harrises to make a bid on the Harrisburg site, but ownership of the property had still not been settled. By 1838, Mary Jane Harris and her family constructed a house on that property and reorganized the town in order to sell lots.

Harris County, Texas was named for John Richardson Harris and Houston is the county seat; Harris is the third largest county in the United States.
