= Harrisburg, Houston =

Neighborhood in Houston, Texas, US

Coordinates: 29.7162°N 95.2776°W

Harrisburg (originally Harrisburgh, shortened to Harrisburg in 1892) is a community now located within the city of Houston, Texas.

The community is located east of Downtown Houston, south of the Brays Bayou and Buffalo Bayou junction and west of Brady's Island. It was founded before 1825 on the eastern stretches of the Buffalo Bayou in present-day Harris County, Texas, on land belonging to John Richardson Harris. In 1926, Harrisburg was annexed into the city of Houston. The original name of Harris County was Harrisburg (Harrisburgh) County until it was shortened after the demise of the City of Harrisburg. Historical markers at the John Richardson Harris site tell of General Santa Anna's razing the town as he chased Sam Houston and his retreating army just before they reached Lynch's Ferry.

== History ==
Harrisburg, Texas, in a 1913 map of the Houston region

=== Mexican Texas ===
Harrisburg was named Harrisburg by its founder, John Richardson Harris. Harris named the town after both himself and Harrisburg, Pennsylvania, which had been named after his great-grandfather. Harris hired Frank Johnson to survey a town site there in 1826. Harrisburg was located at the mouth of Bray's Bayou at Buffalo Bayou. In 1829, Harris established a home and a trading post, where he also started building a steam mill while in partnership with his brothers, David Harris and William P. Harris. John Richardson Harris traveled to New Orleans for parts needed to complete his machinery, but contracted yellow fever and died there. The two brothers continued to reside in and maintain the businesses in Harrisburg.

John Richardson Harris was survived by a wife and children, who were residing in Upstate New York at his death. His wife, Jane Birdsall Harris, immigrated to Mexican Texas in 1833 with De Witt Clinton Harris, her eldest son. Meanwhile, David and William Harris expanded their business in Harrisburg by bringing in two ships for the transport of goods in and out of the region.

=== Texas Republic ===
In 1835, the General Council of Texas, a provisional government of Texas, made Harrisburg its capital. On April 16, 1836, during the Texas Revolution, almost all of Harrisburg was burned by the forces of Antonio López de Santa Anna.

In the summer of 1836, John Kirby Allen and Augustus Chapman Allen sought town sites in the Galveston Bay region. After making a small investment in Galveston, they failed in a bid for the property at Morgan's Point, Texas, near the mouth of Buffalo Bayou. Next, the Allen brothers traveled several miles upstream to Harrisburg, where they negotiated an agreement for Jane Birdsall Harris to sell the town site. But there was a dispute about who owned Harrisburg, and Harris could not produce a clear title at that time. So the Allen brothers abandoned their plan for Harrisburg.

The Republic of Texas passed a statute of incorporation for Harrisburg on June 5, 1837. Later, some Boston investors formed the Harrisburg Town Company and annexed the town of Hamilton in 1839, when the population of Harrisburg had increased to about 1,400.

In 1840, Andrew Briscoe established the Harrisburg and Brazos Rail Road and contracted with Maurice Birdsall to provide cut wood along the proposed rail corridor in and near Harrisburg. Briscoe also placed an advertisement to hire 60 enslaved men as railroad construction laborers. The Republic of Texas granted a charter for this company on January 9, 1841. No more than a few miles of road bed were graded by the company.

=== After annexation of Texas ===
After construction of the Harrisburg and Brazos Rail Road and development of Harrisburg had stalled for several years, the Harrisburg Town Company sold all of its unsold real estate in 1847 to Sidney Sherman, who led a group of investors from Boston to promote the town. Harrisburg real estate was leveraged for a new plan to build a railroad with an eastern terminus at a peninsula at the mouth of Braes Bayou. The investment group organized the Buffalo Bayou, Brazos, and Colorado Railway (B.B.B. & C.) and secured a charter from the State of Texas on February 11, 1850. Sherman was the founding partner, but also succeeded in recruiting investors from Houston, including William Marsh Rice, William J. Hutchins, and Benjamin A. Shepherd. The B. B. B. & C. hired John Williams to survey the route.

Williams completed his survey of the B.B.B. & C. route between Harrisburg and the Brazos River in 1851. It began operations on January 1, 1853. Harrisburg was the starting point of the line, the first functioning railroad line in the state.

After the Civil War, the railroad expanded and changed its name to the Galveston, Harrisburg and San Antonio Railway. Harrisburg remained an important rail town until a fire in the 1870s destroyed the rail yards, which were rebuilt in Houston.

The population of Harrisburg dwindled with the loss of the railroads and with the widening of the Houston Ship Channel in 1919. In December 1926, the City of Houston annexed Harrisburg. The 1926 annexation of the Harrisburg area added 1,293 acres (523 ha) of land to the city limits.

== Government and infrastructure ==
Harrisburg is in Houston City Council District I, which also includes the Port of Houston, East Downtown, and Clinton Park.

The United States Postal Service operates the Harrisburg Post Office, at 8330 Manchester Street. In July 2011, the Postal Service announced that the post office may close.

The Harris Health System, formerly the Harris County Hospital District, designated the Ripley Health Center for the ZIP code 77012. In 2000, Ripley was replaced by the Gulfgate Health Center. The designated public hospital is Ben Taub General Hospital in the Texas Medical Center.

== Demographics ==
In the city of Houston-defined Harrisburg/Manchester Super Neighborhood, which also includes Manchester, there were 2,926 residents in 2015. 82% were Hispanics, 14% were non-Hispanic blacks, and 3% were non-Hispanic whites. The percentages of non-Hispanic Asians and others were both zero. In 2000, the super neighborhood had 3,768 residents. 88% were Hispanics, 6% were non-Hispanic blacks, and 5% were non-Hispanic whites. The percentages of non-Hispanic Asians and others were both zero.

== Education ==
=== Primary and secondary schools ===
==== Public schools ====
Harrisburg is served by the Houston Independent School District.

Many area residences are zoned to J. R. Harris Elementary School, including everything east of Broadway and some areas west of it, generally north and/or on Elm. Some are zoned to Dávila Elementary School. Residences are zoned to Deady Middle School, and Milby High School.

The area was previously in the Harrisburg Independent School District. J. R. Harris opened as Harrisburg School in 1895. A school for black students, also called Harrisburg School, opened in 1904. In 1952, that school for black students moved into a new building and was renamed "Kay Elementary School," after its first principal, who had been Savannah Georgia Kay. Kay Elementary School closed in 1978. Students at Chávez High School use the former Kay Elementary School as a "land lab."

=== Public libraries ===
Harrisburg is served by the Stanaker Branch of Houston Public Library.

== See also ==
- Birdsall Briscoe
- Mary Jane Briscoe

== Bibliography ==
- Briscoe, P. (1904). "The First Railroad in Texas". Quarterly of the Texas State Historical Association. 7 (4): 279−285. JSTOR 27784974.
- Cook, Stephen C. (2017). "The Audacious Launch of the City of Houston: Capital of the Republic of Texas". Southwestern Historical Quarterly. 121 (2): 123−144. doi:10.1353/swh.2017.0051. JSTOR 44647208.
- Fox, Stephen (2022). The Architecture of Birdsall P. Briscoe. College Station, TX: Texas A&M University Press. ISBN 978-1648430527.
- Houghton, Dorothy Knox Howe; Bradley, Barrie Scardino; Howe, Katherine S.; Blackburn, Sadie Gwin (1998). Houston's Forgotten Heritage: Landscapes, Houses, Interiors, 1824−1914. College Station, TX: Texas A&M University Press. ISBN 978-1-62349-246-5.
- Sibley, Marilyn McAdams (1968). Port of Houston: A History. Austin: University of Texas Press.
